= Red Book of the Exchequer =

- The National Archives, London
- Material: Parchment

The Red Book of the Exchequer (Liber Rubeus or Liber ruber Scaccarii) is a 13th-century manuscript compilation of precedents and office memoranda of the English Exchequer. It contains additional entries and annotations down to the 18th century. It is now held at The National Archives, Kew, London. It takes its name from its red leather binding, which distinguishes it from the related and contemporary, but smaller, Black Book of the Exchequer.

J. Horace Round wrote in 1898 that "second only in honour to Domesday Book itself, the "Liber Rubeus de Scaccario" has, for more than six centuries, held a foremost place among our national records. Prized by officials for its precedents, by antiquaries for its vast store of topographical and genealogical information, its well-thumbed pages have been scanned by twenty generations of students".

== Creation and content ==
The early part of the Red Book was compiled in about 1230 by Alexander of Swerford (d. 1246), a senior Exchequer clerk until about 1220 and a Baron of the Exchequer from 1234. However, entries continued to be added to it throughout the later Middle Ages, and even down to the 18th century.

The Book contains nearly 300 separate records and texts, including "Charters, Statutes of the Realm, Placita, or other public acts, with private Deeds and Ordinances, Correspondence, Chronicles or Annals, religious, physical or legal Treatises, Topographies, Genealogies or Successions, Surveys and Accounts, precedents and Facetiae". Among them are texts of the 1166 Cartae Baronum, a survey of feudal tenure; the Leges Henrici Primi, an early compilation of legal information dating from the reign of Henry I; the Constitutio domus regis, a handbook on the running of the royal household of about 1136; the Dialogus de Scaccario, a late 12th-century treatise on the practice of the Exchequer; the Book of Fees of c.1302; a 14th-century treatise on the Royal Mint; 12th-century pipe rolls; deeds and grants of William I and Henry I; a text of Magna Carta; records of serjeanties; and forms of oaths of Exchequer officers and of the king's councillors.

== Physical description ==
The book is a thick folio volume of 345 parchment folios, measuring 13.5 inches (34 cm) long, by 9.5 inches (24 cm) wide, by 3.5 inches (8.9 cm) deep. As a result of ill-judged attempts to restore illegible text by the application of gallic acid, a few pages are now unreadable.

== Custodial history ==
Despite its origins within the Exchequer, in the Middle Ages the Red Book appears to have been sometimes held in the office of the royal Wardrobe, and to have travelled with the royal household. In the early modern period, it was held in the office of the King's (or Queen's) Remembrancer, where it was stored in an iron chest. It was routinely carried into the Court of King's Bench by the Secondary (deputy official) in the King's Remembrancer's Office, to assert privilege of the Exchequer: under this privilege, the Court of Exchequer reserved the right to hear suits brought against any of the Exchequer's officers or accountants. In the 17th and 18th centuries it became well known to antiquaries, and is frequently cited in the works of William Dugdale, Thomas Madox, Peter Le Neve, and Thomas Hearne, among others.

In 1870 the Book was transferred to the custody of the Master of the Rolls, and placed in the Public Record Office. It is now held in The National Archives at Kew, London, under reference code E 164/2.

== Publication ==
A detailed description and listing of the contents of the Red Book was published by Joseph Hunter in 1838.

An edition of the Book was published in 1897 in three volumes in the government-funded Rolls Series, edited by Hubert Hall of the Public Record Office. It was one of the last works to be commissioned in the series, and is numbered 99, the final work, in the unofficial (but widely followed) HMSO numbering sequence. The edition is selective: Hall reordered the Red Book's contents to a more rational arrangement, and omitted a certain amount of material, including texts which already existed in print elsewhere (or which he expected to reach print shortly), many of the later addenda, and some entries for which he simply did not have space.

The editor originally appointed, in 1885, had been W. D. Selby, but he took his own life while suffering from typhoid fever in 1889. Hall and J. H. Round were then appointed co-editors. Round withdrew for reasons of ill-health in 1890, but for some time afterwards Hall continued to consult him, and to send him proof sheets for checking. However, the relationship of the two men then deteriorated, and progressed to a vehement literary feud, conducted through the pages of periodical publications and in privately printed pamphlets, in the period immediately before and after the publication of the edition. Round (a notoriously belligerent and acerbic critic) accused Hall of scholarly and editorial incompetence, while Hall accused Round of double-dealing and of having deliberately remained silent about errors in the proofs so that he could use them to attack Hall's reputation at a later date. Other reviewers, such as Charles Gross in the American Historical Review and T. F. Tout in the English Historical Review, were more positive about Hall's achievement, while still finding points of detail to criticise. Reginald Lane Poole, also writing in the English Historical Review, was inclined to side with Round. In one of his contributions to the dispute, Studies on the Red Book of the Exchequer (1898), Round wrote:

It has now been definitely shown that it is possible, in England at any rate, to publish a work of historical importance, for permanent and universal reference, so replete with heresy and error as to lead astray for ever all students of its subject, and yet to run the gauntlet of reviewers, not only virtually unscathed, but even with praise and commendation.

Hall's edition of the Red Book, he alleged, was "probably the most misleading publication in the whole range of the Rolls series". The view of modern scholars is that, while Round's behaviour and language was intemperate and unnecessarily offensive, there was a degree of truth in his criticism of Hall's work. In Margaret Procter's words (paraphrasing Sellar and Yeatman), "Round had been shown to be (largely) right but repulsive and Hall as (largely) wrong but romantic".

== Bibliography ==
=== Edition ===
- Hall, Hubert, ed. (1896). The Red Book of the Exchequer: Part I. Rolls Series. London: Her Majesty's Stationery Office. Contents include scutages and barons' charters.
- Hall, Hubert, ed. (1896). The Red Book of the Exchequer: Part II. Rolls Series. London: Her Majesty's Stationery Office. Contents include serjeanties; knights' fees; abstracts of pipe rolls, 1154–62; wards, farms of counties, etc.
- Hall, Hubert, ed. (1896). The Red Book of the Exchequer: Part III. Rolls Series. London: Her Majesty's Stationery Office. Contents include the Constitutio domus regis and other miscellaneous texts.

=== Secondary works ===
- Downer, L. J. (1972). "Introduction". In Downer, L. J. (ed.). Leges Henrici Primi. Oxford: Clarendon Press. pp. 1–79. OCLC 389304.
- Grimaldi, Stacey (1828). Origines genealogicae; or, The sources whence English genealogies may be traced from the conquest to the present time. Longman. p. 53. OCLC 220436865.
- Hunter, Joseph (1838). Three Catalogues: describing the contents of the Red Book of the Exchequer, of the Dodsworth manuscripts in the Bodleian Library, and of the manuscripts in the library of the Honourable Society of Lincoln's Inn. Pickering. pp. 1–56. OCLC 65267799.
- Procter, Margaret (2014). "The Red Book of the Exchequer: a curious affair revisited". Historical Research. 87: 510–532.
- Round, J. H. (1898). Studies on the Red Book of the Exchequer. London. OCLC 85065198.
