= William of Ely =

12th-century English clergyman and Treasurer of England

William
- Archdeacon of Cleveland
- Church: Catholic
- In office: 1201
- Previous posts: Canon of St. Paul's; Prebend of Leighton Buzzard

Treasurer
- In office 1196 – August 1215
- Monarchs: Richard I John
- Preceded by: Richard FitzNeal
- Succeeded by: Eustace of Fauconberg, Bishop of London

William of Ely was an English churchman and the fifth Lord High Treasurer of England. He was a relative of Richard FitzNeal and supposed descendant of Nigel, Bishop of Ely, both previous Lord High Treasurers. He was appointed a Canon of St. Paul's just before being made Lord High Treasurer in 1196. He added the position of Archdeacon of Cleveland in 1201 and Prebendary of Leighton Buzzard in 1207.

A story about William of Ely tells of his attempted escape from England during a time when he had fallen from favour with the King; he was disguised as a commoner but was stopped when he proved unable to respond to a simple question posed to him in English (illustrating the dominance of the French language among nobles and clergymen at the time).

== See also ==
- List of lord high treasurers of England and Great Britain

Political offices
Preceded by Richard FitzNeal	Lord High Treasurer; 1196–1215	Succeeded by Eustace of Fauconberg
