= Printer's mark =

Symbol used as a trademark by printers

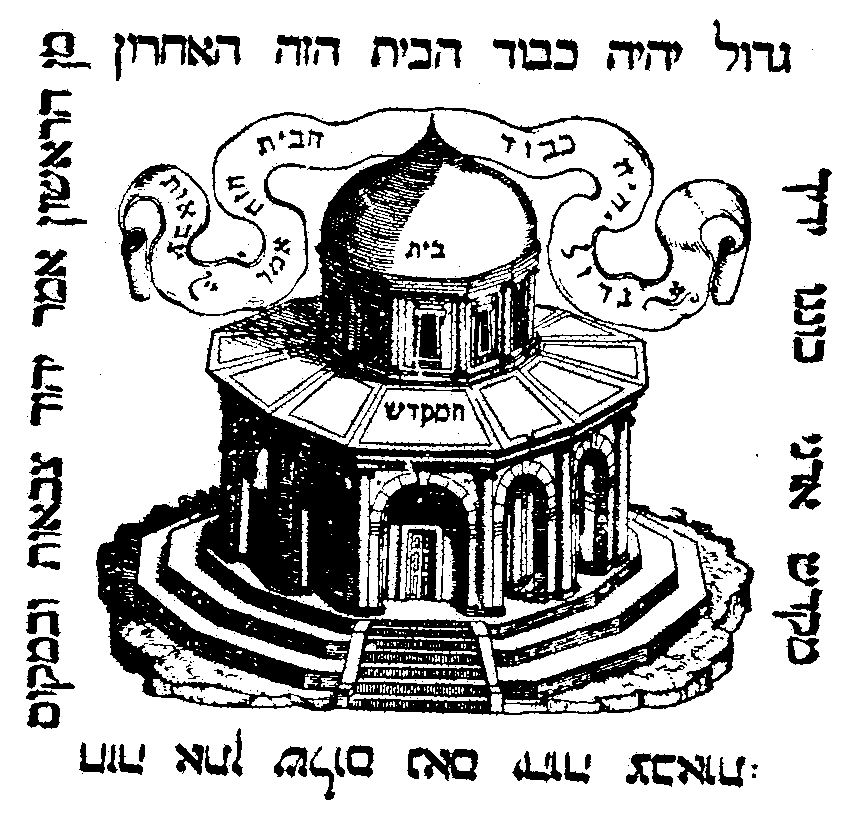
The Temple in Jerusalem depicted as the Dome of the Rock on the printer's mark of Marco Antonio Giustiniani, Venice 1545–52

A printer's mark, device, emblem or insignia is a symbol that was used as a trademark by early printers starting in the 15th century. A more nuanced definition is provided by McKerrow (see below):

that any picture, design, or ornament (not being an initial letter) found on a title-page, final leaf, or in any other conspicuous place in a book, and having an obvious reference to the sign at which the printer or publisher of the book carried on business, or to the name of either of them, or including the arms or crest of either of them, is—whatever its origin—that printer's or publisher's device.

— Ronald B. McKerrow, Printers' and Publishers' Devices

The first printer's mark is found in the 1457 Mainz Psalter by Johann Fust and Peter Schöffer. One of the most well-known old printer's marks is the dolphin and anchor, first used by the Venetian printer Aldus Manutius as his mark in 1502.

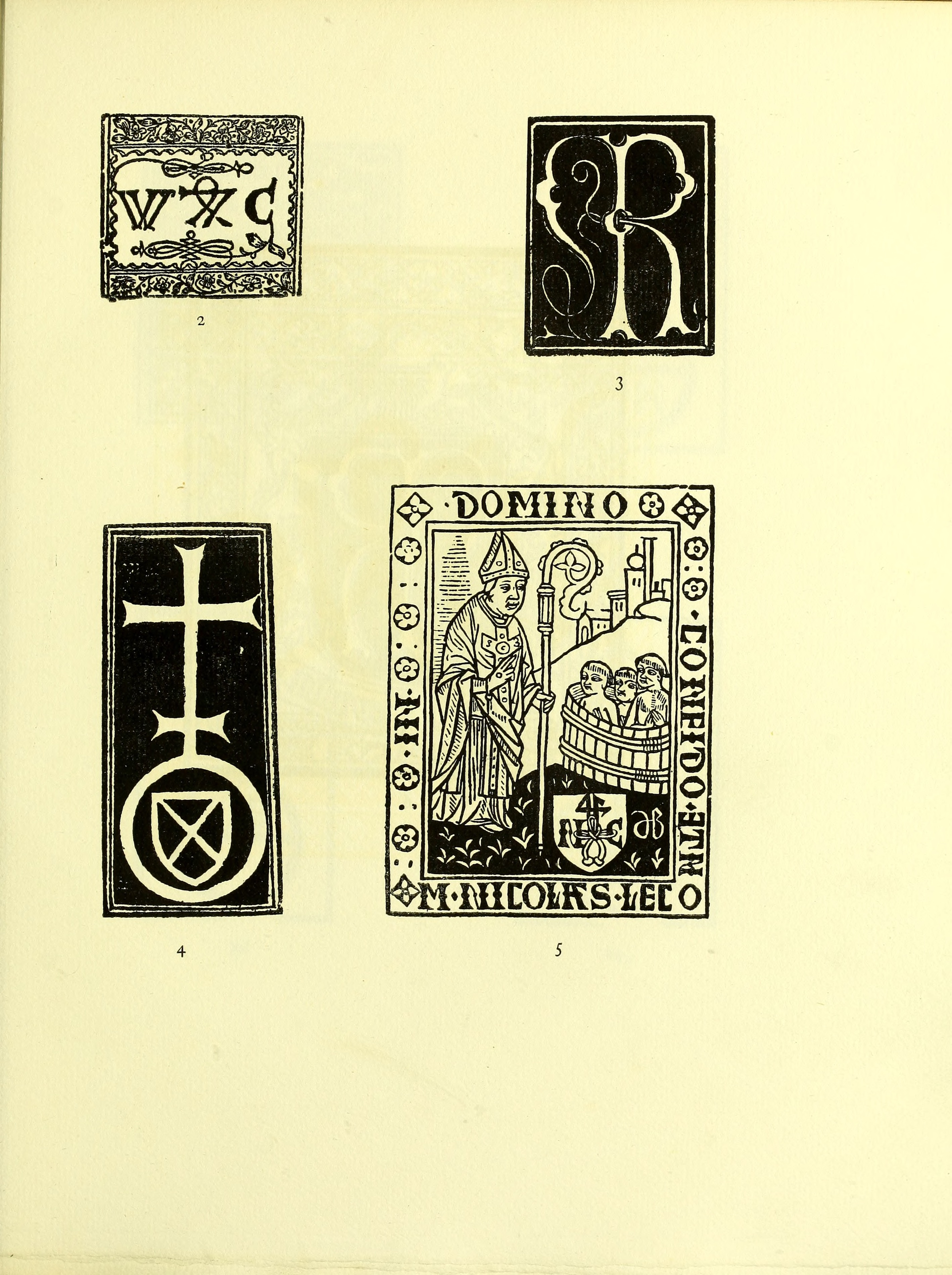
Example page from McKerrow's Printers' & Publishers' Devices

The standard reference is Printers' & Publishers' Devices by Ronald B. McKerrow, published by The Bibliographical Society in 1913 as number 16 in their series of illustrated monographs. It has a detailed Introduction and illustrations of 428 devices printed in their original sizes. Originally printed by the Chiswick Press, it was reprinted in 1949.

The Library of the University of Barcelona launched a database of Printers' Devices in the ancient book section in October 1998. The University of Florida libraries also provide digital access to printers' devices and include The University of Chicago devices that have appeared on the cover of their publication The Library Quarterly.

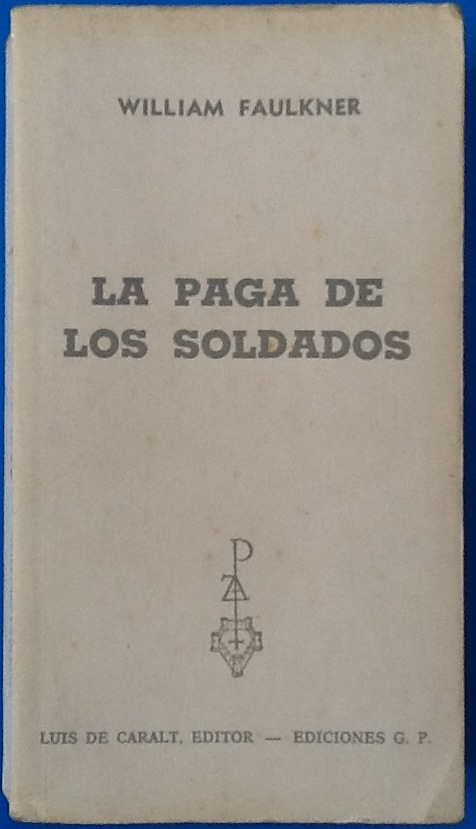
Printer's mark in use in the modern era

Printers' devices have been incorporated in American library buildings, reflecting the British Arts and Crafts Movement.

From 1931 to 2012, Library Quarterly featured 328 printers' marks with an article on the history of each mark.

== See also ==
- Bookplate
- Colophon
- Factory mark
- Merchant's mark
- Union label

== Publications ==
- Havens, E., Tabb, W., & Sheridan Libraries. (2015). Renaissance printers' devices : essays on the early art of printing & the King Memorial Windows of Johns Hopkins University. Sheridan Libraries, Johns Hopkins University.
