= Humbrechthof =

Building in which Johannes Gutenberg worked

Coordinates: 50.00034°N 8.27267°E

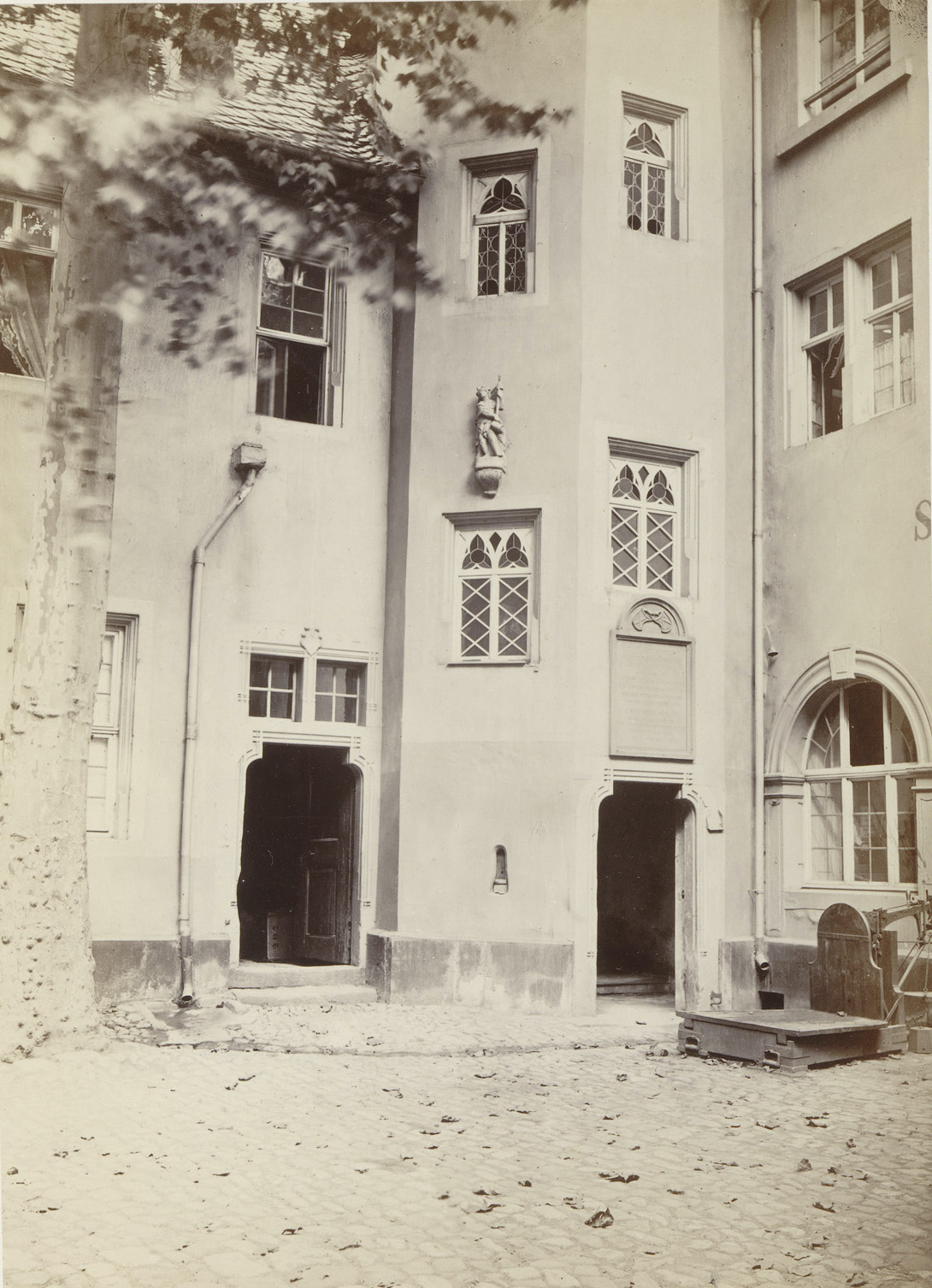
Hof zum Humbrecht, picture dated around 1850–1865

The Humbrechthof, also known as Hof zum Humbrecht, was the building in which Johannes Gutenberg developed his technique of printing with movable metal type and set up his first printing press. It was located in the old town of Mainz. Today, the houses at Schusterstraße 22 and 24 are located on the site.

== History ==
According to Mainz chronicles, Gutenberg and Johann Fust set up their print shop in the Humbrechthof around 1450, where, among other things, the 42-line Gutenberg Bible was produced. In 1455, after losing a legal dispute with Fust over the repayment of a loan, Gutenberg returned to his father's house, where he continued his printing business.

Around 1470/71, Peter Schöffer, a calligrapher, the principal workman of Johannes Gutenberg and later Fust's son-in-law, acquired the Hof zum Humbrecht, which was later called the Schöfferhof. From 1489 until his death in 1503, Peter Schöffer was a judge in Mainz. With his wife Christina Fust, Peter Schöffer had four sons, Johann of whom took over his father's Mainz workshop.

The building served as a printing house from 1481 and housed Schöffer's workshop at that time.

== Present age ==
Today, only the staircase tower from 1584 remains of the printing house.

A plaque is attached to the staircase tower. Its inscription (translated):

Hof zum Humbrecht

Printing house of Johann Fust and Peter Schöffer of Gernsheim in which the first perfect printing work appeared in 1457 later the printing house of Johann and Ivo Schöffer until 1553. Joseph Diefenbach dedicates this memorial stone to the perfecters and propagators of the art of letterpress printing.

August 14, 1825.
