= Hervey le Breton =

12th-century Bishop of Ely and Bangor

Hervey
- Bishop of Ely
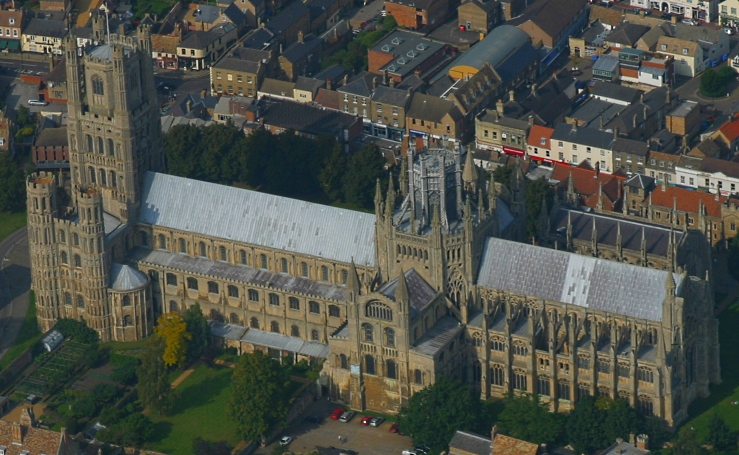
- The transepts, or the short wings crossing in the middle of the long axis of Ely Cathedral, date from before Hervey's time as bishop.
- Appointed: 1109
- Installed: October 1109
- Term ended: 30 August 1131
- Predecessor: new foundation
- Successor: Nigel
- Other posts: Bishop of Bangor royal chaplain

Orders
- Consecration: 1092 by Thomas of Bayeux

Personal details
- Died: 30 August 1131
- Buried: 31 August 1131; Ely Cathedral

Hervey le Breton (also known as Hervé le Breton; died 30 August 1131) was a Breton cleric who became Bishop of Bangor in Wales and later Bishop of Ely in England. Appointed to Bangor by King William II of England, when the Normans were advancing into Wales, Hervey was unable to remain in his diocese when the Welsh began to drive the Normans back from their recent conquests. Hervey's behaviour towards the Welsh seems to have contributed to his expulsion from his see. Although the new king, Henry I wished to translate Hervey to the see of Lisieux in Normandy, it was unsuccessful.

In 1109, a new diocese was created in England, at Ely. Hervey was appointed to this new bishopric. While bishop, Hervey ordered the compilation of a house chronicle, which later became the Liber Eliensis. He supervised the construction of a causeway between Ely and Exning, which allowed easier access to Ely.

== Early life ==
Hervey was a native of Brittany, and some sources state a chaplain of King William II of England, while others are less certain that he was a chaplain for the king. He was appointed Bishop of Bangor in 1092 by King William. Bangor at the time was in the Kingdom of Gwynedd, which had recently been overrun by the Normans, and following the killing of Robert of Rhuddlan had been taken over by Hugh d'Avranches, 1st Earl of Chester. The appointment of Hervey was probably intended to further consolidate the Norman hold on the area. Bangor was under the jurisdiction of the diocese of Canterbury, but Hervey was consecrated by Thomas of Bayeux, who was the Archbishop of York, since the see of Canterbury was vacant at the time.

== Problems at Bangor ==
Relations between Hervey and the Welsh appear to have been very bad. The Liber Eliensis described the situation as follows:

Since they [the Welsh] did not show the respect and reverence due to a bishop, he [Hervey] wielded the sharp two-edged sword to subdue them, constraining them both with repeated excommunications and with the host of his kinsmen and other followers. They resisted him nonetheless and pressed him with such dangers that they killed his brother and intended to deal with him the same way, if they could lay hands on him.

Hervey was forced to rely on his own armed bands for protection. In 1094, a Welsh revolt against Norman rule in Gwynedd began under the leadership of Gruffudd ap Cynan, and by the late 1090s Hervey had been driven from his diocese by the Welsh. William of Malmesbury, however, states that the reason Hervey left Bangor was that the revenues of the see were too low. He remained nominally Bishop of Bangor until 1109. King Henry I of England tried to translate Hervey to the see of Lisieux in 1106, but the attempt was unsuccessful. The main opposition came from Archbishop Anselm of Canterbury, who was the metropolitan of Bangor, and refused to allow Hervey to go to a Norman bishopric. Anselm had the ability to decide the issue as Pope Paschal II had turned the decision of whether to translate Hervey to another see over to Anselm in 1102. While in exile, Hervey served as King Henry's confessor. Bangor itself remained vacant until 1120, when David the Scot was appointed.

== Appointment to Ely ==
Before his death in 1107, Richard, the abbot of Ely, had attempted to secure from the papacy the elevation of his abbey into a bishopric. After Richard's death, Hervey was appointed to oversee the abbey during the vacancy. He convinced the monks of Ely to support Richard's project, which received the conditional approval of Archbishop Anselm, contingent on papal approval. Paschal signalled his approval, and in 1109 the monastery became a bishopric. Ely still remained a monastic house, as the abbey itself became the cathedral and the monks of the abbey became the monks of the cathedral chapter. Also in 1109, the pope approved Hervey's translation to a new see, and he was made Bishop of Ely. He was enthroned at Ely in October 1109.

While bishop, Hervey ordered the compilation of a history of the refounding of the abbey of Ely, which later became incorporated into the Liber Eliensis. This was a Latin reworking of an Old English book of grants compiled by Bishop Æthelwold of Winchester. He was energetic in recovering the feudal rights of the bishopric against knights who had intruded themselves on the lands, but were not rendering knight service to the bishop. As bishop, he attended a legatine council, or council held by a papal legate, in 1127, and a royal council in 1129, but otherwise his administrative actions remain obscure. The causeway between the island of Ely and Exning, which made it easier for pilgrims to visit the shrine of Saint Etheldreda, was built under Hervey's orders. Insight into his activities as bishop is given in the Pipe Roll of 1130, the first surviving Pipe Roll. In that record, Hervey is recorded as owing King Henry 45 pounds to provide an office for a nephew, 100 pounds on an old settlement with the king, another 100 pounds for the settlement of a case dealing with Ramsey Abbey, Bury St. Edmunds Abbey and the bishop, 240 pounds for the right to be rid of a surplus of knights, and finally 1000 pounds for the king to allow the bishop's knights to serve castleguard at Ely instead of Norwich.

== Death ==
Hervey died on 30 August 1131. He was buried in Ely Cathedral on 31 August 1131. He was disliked by Archbishop Anselm, and he was described as a man of "secular tastes". His nephew, William Brito, was a royal chaplain and was appointed Archdeacon of Ely by 1110. Another nephew was Richard, who in 1130 is recorded in the Pipe Roll as paying a fine to the king for land that his uncle had given him. Another of Hervey's relatives was Gilbert Universalis, who was appointed to the see of London in 1128 by Henry I.

== Citations ==
Catholic Church titles
| Preceded by Revedun | Bishop of Bangor; 1092–1109 | Succeeded by David the Scot |
| New title | Bishop of Ely; 1109–1131 | Succeeded by Nigel |
