= Giovanni Angelo Scinzenzeler =

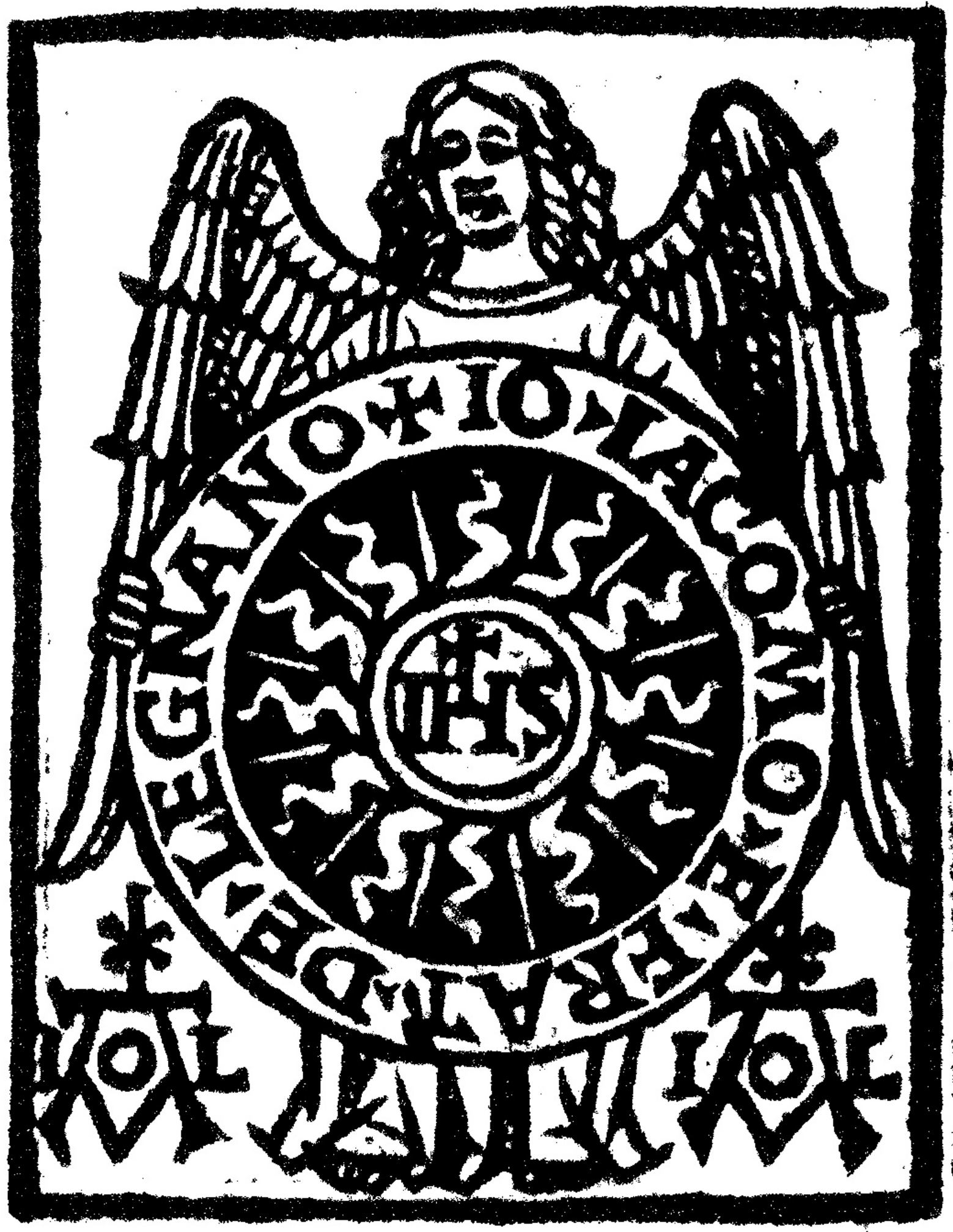
Printer's mark of Ioannes Iacobus de Legnano et fratres appearing on books printed by Scinzenzeler for that publishing house

Giovanni Angelo Scinzenzeler was a printer in Milan from 1477 to 1526. He published more than 200 books.

== Biography ==
Scinzenzeler began his career under the apprenticeship of his father, Ulrich Scinzenzeler. Giovanni has been described as "the most prolific of the Milanese printers in the early 1500s".

He often printed on commission for the Milanese publishing house Ioannes Iacobus de Legnano et fratres. They used a printer's mark comprising an angel holding a disc bearing the inscription "IO IACOMO E FRAT. DE LEGNANO" around a blazing sun, in the middle of which are the letters I.H.S., under a cross.

Giovanni Angelo Scinzenzeler printed four editions of The Imitation of Christ, in 1500, 1504, 1511 and 1519 (his father Giovanni had published one in 1489).
