= Expositiones vocabulorum biblie =

Latin parchment by William Brito

The Expositiones Vocabulorum Biblie (Exposition of Bible Words), also known as The Brito Book, is a Latin treatise written (or inspired) by the 12th century clergyman William Brito (Guillaume le Breton). It is, in essence, a dictionary. It gives explanations, derivations and etymologies of words, some from Greek or Hebrew, for the most difficult words in the Vulgate Bible. Entries are arranged in alphabetical order, demonstrating William's wide knowledge, many drawn from a range of classical, patristic and medieval writers.

It is one of the very few documents to survive King Henry VIII's Dissolution of the Monasteries in the 1530s. There are several known extant copies, including one that is now owned by the National Trust in Britain and, as of April 2013, on display at Lacock Abbey, Wiltshire.

== National Trust copy ==
The National Trust book is bound (or rebound) in wooden front and back panels, with leather bindings. It shows signs that it would have originally been chained (for security and safety) in an alcove for common use by people within the Abbey, and originally used to assist with translation of the Bible by the nuns of Lacock Abbey. It is written in maybe four different hands as a collegial work by monks. Various notes and papers specific to Lacock Abbey have been bound into this volume over the years, further linking it to the site.

This volume realised £46,850 at auction in 2011. It was sold at Christie's on 23 November 2011, by the Talbot family that once owned Lacock Abbey, of whom William Henry Fox Talbot is perhaps the best-known member as the inventor the calotype process, a precursor to photographic processes of the 19th and 20th centuries.

== Influence ==
It is known that this dictionary had a wide circulation and was regarded as an essential scholarly tool. In 1284, it was one of the three texts that Archbishop John Pecham instructed Merton College, Oxford, to have for the use and instruction of the poor of the area, chained to one of the desks.

== See also ==
- Mammotrectus super Bibliam
