= Mammotrectus super Bibliam =

Bible interpretation guide

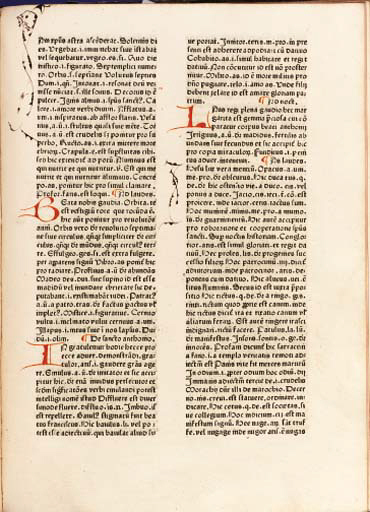
1474 edition of the Mammotrectus printed in Strasbourg

Mammotrectus super Bibliam ("nourisher on the Bible") of John Marchesinus is a guide to understanding the text of the Bible. It is one of the most important Franciscan school texts of the later Middle Ages and was written for the education of clerics.

The Mammotrectus was written in Latin by the Franciscan John Marchesinus, at Regio, near Modena, at the end of the 13th century. It was the most important work of Marchesinus. He based his work mainly on Expositiones vocabulorum biblie of the Franciscan William Brito, written between 1250 and 1270.

The Mammotrectus contains about 1,300 articles and is divided into three parts: 1) explanations for difficult biblical words and passages; 2) a series of digressions on orthography, the accents of Latin words, the seven feasts of the Old Testament Law, the clothing of priests, the principles of exegesis and translation, the names of God, the qualities and properties of Scripture, and a treatise on the four main ecumenical councils; 3) liturgical pieces and some related materials (the hymns, legends of saints, sermons and homilies). The author was aware that his book was imperfect and he wrote in the preface: "Let any imperfections in the book be attributed to me: and if there is anything good, let it be thought to have come from God."

Variants on the title are known. Marchesinus names it "Mammotrectus" or "Mammetractus", which he explains as "led by a pedagogue"; but another contemporary form of the name was "Mammothreptus", which was interpreted as "brought up by one's grandmother".

The first printed edition was published in Mainz by Peter Schöffer in 1470. The book was popular in the 15th century, but its popularity declined in the 16th century. Henri Bebel criticized it in 1508 (Commentaria deabusione linguae latinae apud Germanos, Pforzheim). Desiderius Erasmus criticized in 1515 – in one of the symposiums Synodus grammaticorum – those priests who still read the Mammotrectus. The book was also criticized by François Rabelais (in Gargantua and Pantagruel) and Martin Luther (1524). Protestants rejected the book completely and it was quickly forgotten. Frans van Liere called the work "tools for fools" in 2003.

In 1879 Samuel Berger listed fifteen manuscripts of the Mammotrectus, all in continental European libraries, and further manuscripts of the text were identified in the 20th century. Most of the early printed editions of the Mammotrectus differ from the earliest manuscripts and for this reason, according to one source, "the Mammotrectus urgently needs a modern scholarly edition."
