= Eustace of Fauconberg =

13th-century Bishop of London and Treasurer of England

- Bishop of London
- Elected: 26 February 1221
- Term ended: October 1228
- Predecessor: William of Sainte-Mère-Eglise
- Successor: Roger Niger
- Other post: Prebendary of Holbourn

Orders
- Consecration: 25 April 1221

Personal details
- Died: October 1228
- Denomination: Catholic

6th Lord High Treasurer
- In office 4 November 1217 – 1228
- Monarch: Henry III
- Preceded by: William of Ely
- Succeeded by: Walter Mauclerk

Eustace of Fauconberg was a medieval English Bishop of London from 1221 to 1228 and was also Lord High Treasurer.

== Biography ==
Eustace was the son of Walter de Fauconberg of Rise-in-Holderness in the East Riding of the English county of Yorkshire.

Eustace was selected as treasurer in 1217, probably on 4 November, and held the office until his death. He held the prebend of Holbourn in the diocese of London before being elected to the see of London on 26 February 1221 and consecrated on 25 April 1221.

Eustace died between 24 and 31 October 1228. There was a tomb memorial to him in the quire at Old St Paul's Cathedral.

== Citations ==
Political offices
Preceded by William of Ely	Lord High Treasurer; 1217–1228	Succeeded by Walter Mauclerk
Catholic Church titles
Preceded by William of Sainte-Mère-Eglise	Bishop of London; 1221–1228	Succeeded by Roger Niger
