= Nigel (bishop of Ely) =

Anglo-Norman bishop and treasurer (c. 1100–1169)

- Bishop of Ely
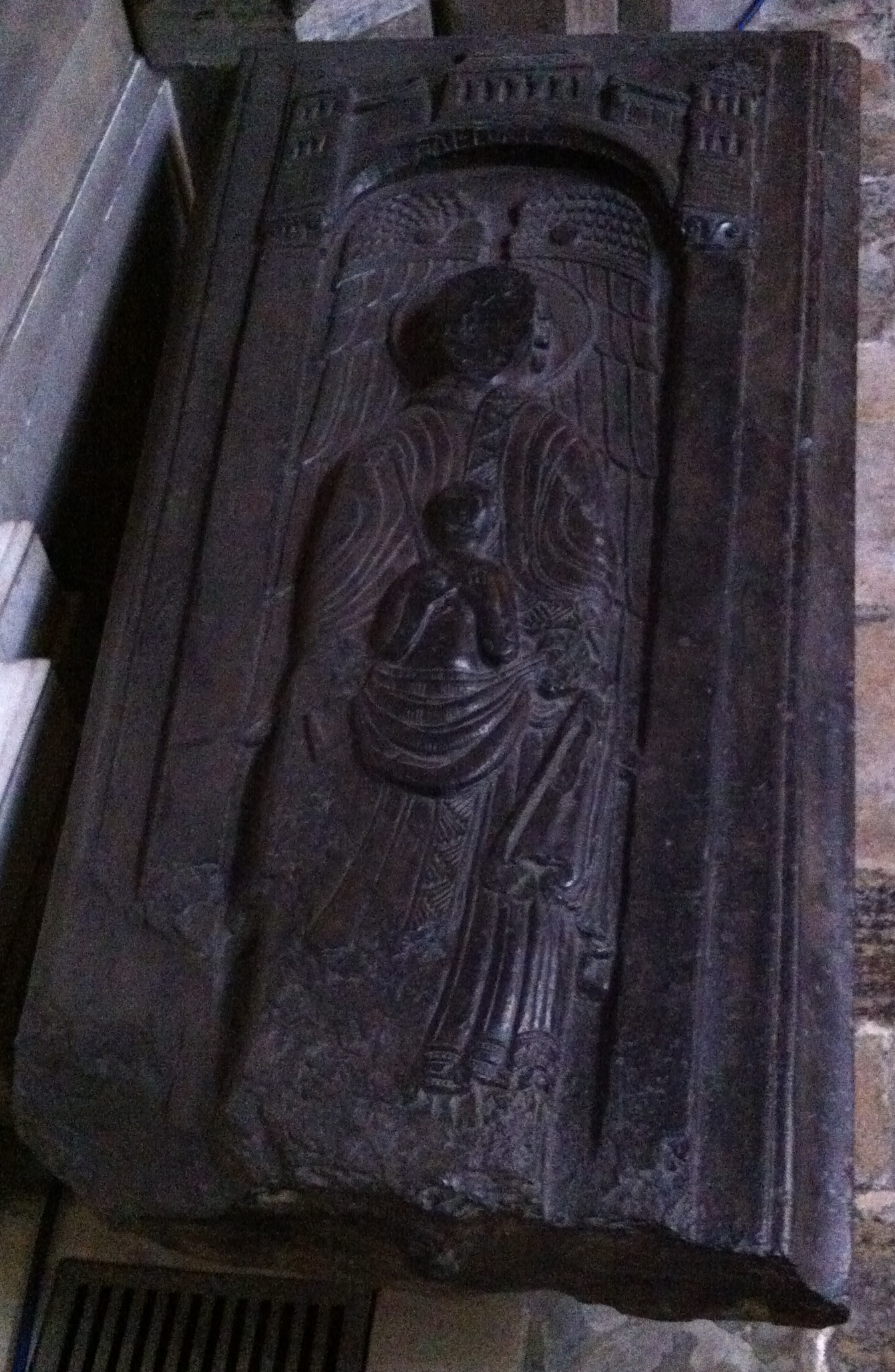
- Memorial to Nigel in Ely Cathedral
- Appointed: 1133
- Predecessor: Hervey le Breton
- Successor: Geoffrey Ridel
- Other post: Archdeacon of the diocese of Salisbury (territory is not known)

Orders
- Consecration: 1 October 1133 by William de Corbeil

Personal details
- Born: c. 1100
- Died: 30 May 1169
- Buried: perhaps Ely Cathedral

Lord High Treasurer
- In office c. 1154–c. 1158
- Monarch: Henry II
- Preceded by: Adelelm
- Succeeded by: Richard fitzNeal
- In office c. 1126–c. 1133
- Monarch: Henry I
- Preceded by: None
- Succeeded by: Adelelm

Nigel (Note: Sometimes known as Nigel Poor or Nigel of Ely) (c. 1100–1169) was an Anglo-Norman clergyman and administrator who served as Bishop of Ely from 1133 to 1169. He came from an ecclesiastical family; his uncle Roger of Salisbury was a bishop and government minister for King Henry I, and other relatives also held offices in the English Church and government. Nigel owed his advancement to his uncle, as did Nigel's probable brother Alexander, who, like Nigel, was advanced to episcopal status. Nigel was educated on the continent before becoming a royal administrator. He served as Treasurer of England under King Henry, before being appointed to the see, or bishopric, of Ely in 1133. His tenure was marked by conflicts with the monks of his cathedral chapter, who believed that Nigel kept income for himself that should properly have gone to them.

Following the accession in 1135 of Henry's successor, King Stephen, Nigel remained as treasurer only briefly before his family was ousted from political office by the new king. Nigel rebelled and deserted to Stephen's rival Matilda, but eventually reconciled with Stephen. Although he subsequently held some minor administrative posts, he never regained high office under Stephen. On the king's death in 1154, Nigel was returned to the treasurership by the new king, Henry II. Nigel's second tenure as treasurer saw him return the administration to the practices of Henry I. He withdrew from much of his public work after around 1164, following an attack of paralysis. He was succeeded as treasurer by his son, Richard fitzNeal, whom he had trained in the operations of the Exchequer, or Treasury of England. Most historians assess that Nigel's administrative abilities were excellent, and he is considered to have been more talented as an administrator than as a religious figure.

== Background and early life ==
Nigel's date of birth is uncertain, but it is likely to have been sometime around 1100. Historians occasionally refer to him as Nigel Poor or Nigel of Ely, but before his elevation to the episcopate he was commonly known as Nigel, the bishop's nephew, or Nigel, the treasurer. He was probably a Norman by ancestry although he was brought up in England, which in 1066 had been conquered by the Duke of Normandy, William the Conqueror. Following William's death in 1087 his realm was divided between two of his sons. His middle son, William Rufus, inherited the Kingdom of England, and the Duchy of Normandy passed to his eldest son, Robert Curthose. The youngest son, Henry, received a grant of money, which he used to purchase a lordship in Normandy. The brothers fought amongst themselves for the next twenty years; the initial conflict was between Rufus and Robert, but after Rufus' death in 1100 Henry, who succeeded Rufus as King of England, also became involved. Eventually, in 1106, Henry captured Robert, imprisoned him for life, and took control of Normandy.

Nigel's uncle Roger, Bishop of Salisbury, saw to Nigel's education at the school of Laon in France, where he probably studied mathematics under Anselm of Laon. It is likely that his father was Roger's brother Humphrey. Other students at Laon included William de Corbeil, later Archbishop of Canterbury, Robert de Bethune, who became Bishop of Hereford, Geoffrey le Breton, future Archbishop of Rouen, and other men subsequently to hold bishoprics in the Anglo-Norman dominions.

When he took vows as a cleric is unrecorded, but Nigel held a prebend, an ecclesiastical office in the cathedral, in the see of London before holding one of the offices of archdeacon in the diocese of Salisbury, although which archdeaconry he held is unclear. Most modern historians believe that Nigel was brother to Alexander of Lincoln, later Bishop of Lincoln, but this relationship is not specifically attested in the sources, which state merely that both were Roger's nephews. William of Malmesbury, a medieval chronicler, considered both Alexander and Nigel to be well educated and diligent. Nigel attended the consecration of Bernard as Bishop of St David's at Westminster in 1115, and may have returned to England from Laon by 1112. From the time of his return until around 1120 he served as a royal chaplain and attested a number of royal charters.

== Under Henry I ==
Nigel first became Treasurer in the reign of Henry I, and seems to have held that office from around 1126. He was already a receiver, or auditor and administrator, in the treasury of Normandy, and he served as treasurer for both realms, moving with the king and court between England and Normandy. The date of his appointment is unclear, as until he became a bishop, royal charters listed him as "nephew of the bishop" (Roger of Salisbury) rather than by any office he held. In 1131, though, he was listed in a papal letter as "Nigel, the treasurer", which securely establishes that he held the office at that date.

In 1133, Roger of Salisbury secured the bishopric of Ely for Nigel. Ely had been without a bishop since 1131; after the two-year vacancy, King Henry made the appointment because he was settling outstanding business before leaving England to return to Normandy. At this time Henry also appointed Geoffrey Rufus to Durham, and Æthelwold to the newly created Diocese of Carlisle. Nigel was consecrated on 1 October 1133 at Lambeth by William de Corbeil – who was by then Archbishop of Canterbury – possibly with the assistance of Roger of Salisbury. Nigel continued to hold the office of treasurer until 1136, when he was replaced by a relative, Adelelm, (Note: Adelelm was either the son or the nephew of Roger of Salisbury.) although the historian C. Warren Hollister placed his departure from the office in 1133 with his appointment to Ely. (Note: Whether or not Nigel continued to hold office until 1136, it is clear that Adelelm was not put into office until 1136.) The Constitutio domus regis, or Establishment of the King's Household, may have been written by Nigel, or possibly for his use, and probably was composed around 1135.

Ely had until 1109 been an independent monastery, but its last abbot, Richard, had proposed to the king a plan by which the abbey would become a bishopric, presumably with the abbot himself as bishop. Richard died before the proposal could be put into operation, but in 1109, the custodian of the vacant abbey secured permission to make the change and became the first Bishop of Ely. However, the administrative changes needed to make the abbey into a bishopric took longer, and were still unresolved at the time of Nigel's appointment. Regardless, Nigel was constantly at court, as shown by his appearance 31 times as a witness to charters during the last ten years of Henry I's reign. This left little time for administration of his diocese, and Nigel appointed a married clergyman, Ranulf of Salisbury, to administer the diocese. Ranulf seems to have tyrannized the monks of the cathedral chapter, and Nigel appears to have done little to protect his monks from abuse.

Later, during the early years of Stephen's reign, Nigel claimed to have uncovered a plot led by Ranulf to assassinate Normans. The exact nature of the conspiracy is obscure, and it is unclear what prompted it. The medieval chronicler Orderic Vitalis claimed that Ranulf planned to kill all the Normans in the government and hand the country over to the Scots. After the discovery of the plot, Ranulf fled the country, and Nigel made peace with the monks of his cathedral chapter.

Another source of conflict with his monks was the desire of the cathedral chapter to enjoy the same "liberty" as a corporate body that the bishops did in the diocese. This liberty was a group of rights that the abbey had originally held, and had transferred to the bishop when the abbey became a bishopric. The rights included sake and soke, or the right to command dues from the land, and the right to levy tolls. They also included the right to hold courts dealing with theft. Around 1135, Nigel conceded this point to the monks. Although he restored some of the lands that had been taken from the monks by Ranulf, the Liber Eliensis (the house chronicle of the monks of Ely) continued to decry his administration of the diocese and the lands of the cathedral chapter, alleging that "he kept back for himself some properties of the church which he wanted, and very good ones they were". The chronicle contains a number of complaints that Nigel oppressed the monks or despoiled them.

== Stephen's early reign ==
Following King Henry's death in 1135, the succession was disputed between the king's nephews – Stephen and his elder brother, Theobald – and Henry's surviving legitimate child Matilda, usually known as the Empress Matilda because of her first marriage to Emperor Henry V. King Henry's only legitimate son, William, had died in 1120. After Matilda was widowed in 1125, she returned to her father, who married her to Geoffrey, the count of Anjou. All the magnates of England and Normandy were required to declare fealty to Matilda as Henry's heir, but when Henry I died in 1135, Stephen rushed to England and had himself crowned before either Theobald or Matilda could react. The Norman barons accepted Stephen as Duke of Normandy, and Theobald contented himself with his possessions in France. Matilda, though, was less sanguine, and secured the support of the Scottish king David, who was her maternal uncle, and in 1138 also the support of her half-brother Robert, Earl of Gloucester, an illegitimate son of Henry I. (Note: Henry I had more than 20 illegitimate children.)

After Stephen's accession, Nigel was at first retained as treasurer, but the king came to suspect him and his family of secretly supporting Matilda. The prime movers behind Stephen's suspicions against the bishops were the Beaumont family, headed by the twin brothers Robert, Earl of Leicester, and Waleran, Count of Meulan, who wished to be the main advisors of the king. Roger, Alexander, and Nigel together held key castles, including Salisbury, Devizes, Sherborne, Malmesbury, Sleaford, and Newark. The Beaumonts alleged that Roger and his family were fortifying the castles they held in preparation for turning them over to Matilda. They urged the king to confiscate the castles before they were lost. Although the Gesta Stephani, or Deeds of King Stephen, a medieval chronicle of the events of Stephen's reign, alleges that Roger was disloyal to Stephen, the evidence is against such action by Roger, as he had been an opponent of Matilda since 1126, when she was first put forward as her father's heir. Roger and his family also had been early supporters of Stephen's seizure of the crown after Henry I's death. The contemporary chronicler Orderic Vitalis felt that Roger's family were going to betray the king, but William of Malmesbury believed that the allegations were based on envy from "powerful laymen". Whatever Roger's position, Nigel's own position on Matilda is less clear, and it is possible that he was never as opposed to her as his uncle. No evidence survives that he was estranged from Stephen, however, as Nigel continued to witness charters throughout the first four years of Stephen's reign. According to the historian Marjorie Chibnall, Nigel's family may have been caught up in a dispute between Henry of Blois and the Beaumonts.

== Arrest of the bishops ==
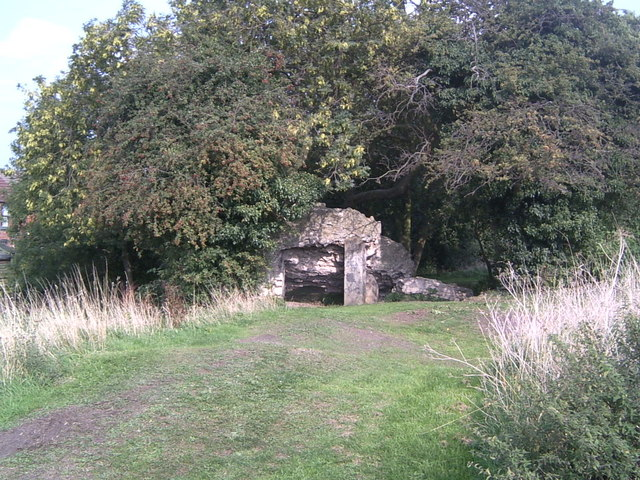
Remains of Sleaford Castle

In 1139, supporters of Roger and his family brawled in public with some men who supported Alan of Brittany. The brawl may have been provoked by the Beaumonts, for Alan was often associated with them. At a court held at Oxford in June 1139, Stephen required Roger of Salisbury, Alexander of Lincoln, and Nigel to surrender their castles as a consequence of the brawl. When Roger and his family delayed, the king ordered their arrest. Nigel managed to escape arrest by fleeing to the castle of Devizes, and the king followed and began a siege. The king threatened to hang Roger in front of the castle unless it capitulated, and Nigel, under pressure from Roger's wife, surrendered the castle after the siege had lasted three days. All three bishops then submitted and surrendered their secular offices and castles. They were, however, allowed to retain their dioceses. (Note: Adelelm also lost his office of Treasurer, and no further Treasurer was appointed until 1158 or 1159.) Nigel surrendered Newark Castle and Sleaford Castle, both of which had been constructed by Alexander. Stephen promptly gave Newark to Robert, Earl of Leicester, who was in turn excommunicated by Alexander of Lincoln.

Stephen's brother, Henry of Blois, who was Bishop of Winchester and papal legate in England, called an ecclesiastical council at Winchester on 29 August 1139, and summoned the king to answer charges that he had unlawfully arrested clergy. The king refused to attend and sent a representative instead. After meeting for a few days, the council was dismissed on 1 September without deciding anything except to appeal to the pope. In the end, the appeal never reached Rome. Part of the problem confronting the assembled bishops was that Stephen had not expelled Roger's family from their ecclesiastical offices, merely their secular ones. Stephen's representatives argued that the bishops had given up their castles and money voluntarily to avoid secular charges. The defence taken by the king was not novel; it had been used before by William I and William II against Odo of Bayeux and William de St-Calais, respectively.

Traditionally, the arrest of the bishops has been seen as a turning point in Stephen's reign and the event that turned the ecclesiastical hierarchy against him. Recent historians have held a lively debate on the issue; a few still hold to the traditional interpretation, but most have decided that reactions in the English church were more ambivalent. One modern historian, David Crouch, believes that the arrest of the bishops signalled the beginnings of the Anarchy, not because of any alienation of the church, but through court politics, where Stephen showed himself incapable of manipulating the factions of his court. The ascendency of the Beaumonts was marked by the placement of one of their protégés, Philip de Harcourt, as Chancellor.

Roger died in December 1139 while in the king's custody. After the death of his uncle, Nigel, then in East Anglia, revolted. In January 1140, he fortified the Isle of Ely, but was soon besieged and forced to flee. Even his own cathedral chapter refused to support him, and his revolt collapsed in January. Nigel took refuge at the court of Stephen's rival, the Empress Matilda, who had landed in England in the south on 30 September 1139 in a bid to take the throne. The revolt stood little chance of succeeding, for there were no supporters of Matilda close to East Anglia, and it is likely that Nigel reacted more out of fear and anger at his uncle's death than anything else. It appears likely that Nigel appealed to Pope Innocent II at this time, for in October 1140 Innocent issued a papal bull, or papal instruction, ordering the restoration to Nigel of the lands of his bishopric, and it appears that after the capture of Stephen, Matilda managed to restore Nigel to Ely briefly. In 1141, Nigel, along with his brother Alexander, was one of the supporters of Matilda who, after the capture of Stephen by Matilda's forces, reached an agreement with Henry of Blois to replace Stephen with Matilda on the throne. Ultimately, this agreement came to nothing when Matilda's chief supporter, her half-brother Robert of Gloucester, was captured and later exchanged for Stephen. Stephen's release meant that the king was free to send Geoffrey de Mandeville against Nigel, and Nigel submitted to the king, probably in 1142.

== Stephen's later reign ==
In 1143 Nigel became involved in a quarrel with the powerful Henry of Blois. Charges of depriving a priest of a church, giving church property to laymen, and encouraging sedition were brought against Nigel, and he was forced to go to Rome to defend himself, only reaching there in 1144. He did not return to his diocese until 1145. He probably accompanied Theobald of Bec, the Archbishop of Canterbury, who went there around this time on separate business. While he was there, Pope Lucius II issued a number of rulings in Nigel's favour, ordering his restitution to Ely. He was then finally reconciled with Stephen by paying a fine of £200 and offering his son Richard fitzNeal as a hostage. While Nigel was at Rome, Ely was attacked by the king's forces. The monks sent to Geoffrey de Mandeville for aid, and Geoffrey came and occupied the Isle of Ely, while the king's forces occupied the lands of the diocese outside the Isle. Both occupying forces did damage to the lands of the diocese and the cathedral chapter. The monks, in the Liber Eliensis, complained that Nigel had taken items from the church to finance his trip, and that they were required to help contribute to the bribe when Nigel was reconciled with Stephen.

By 1147, Nigel was again witnessing Stephen's charters, and in 1153 or 1154, he was named in a grant of lands to St Radegund's Priory in Cambridge. He assisted with the consecration of Hilary of Chichester as Bishop of Chichester in August 1147. He took part in shire courts in both Norfolk and Suffolk in 1150, and continued to assist with episcopal consecrations throughout the remainder of Stephen's reign. No records exist of him being involved with treasury affairs during this time. His witnessing of charters is sparse, and almost always in company with other bishops; this suggests that he was at court only for councils or other similar events. Nigel was a witness to Stephen's charter that left England to Matilda's son, Henry of Anjou. When Henry succeeded Stephen, Nigel was present at the coronation.

== Return to the Exchequer ==
After the accession of Henry II, Nigel was summoned to reorganize the Exchequer, or treasury, that was responsible for the production of the government's financial records, including the Pipe Rolls. The king had to ask Nigel several times to return before the bishop agreed, and one reason for Nigel's reluctance may have been that he would have to work with Robert, Earl of Leicester, one of the Beaumonts, who had been responsible for turning Stephen against Nigel's family in 1139. Another of Nigel's colleagues in the administration was a layman, Richard de Lucy, who served as a justice until 1178. Nigel was the only surviving minister of Henry I, and his knowledge of the Exchequer was needed to help reorganize the revenues of the king and restore administrative practices lost during Stephen's reign. The lone pipe roll to survive from Henry I's reign, for the year 1130, may be Nigel's own copy, brought with him to the Exchequer when he returned under Henry II. Nigel was able to increase the revenues compared to what had been collected under Stephen, but he was unable to quickly return them to the amounts collected under Henry I. It may have been Nigel who urged the king to attempt to recover estates that had been alienated during Stephen's reign.

The pipe roll for 1155–1156 has several entries which declare that Nigel was making decisions about monetary affairs and issuing writs, but later pipe rolls do not contain any such entries. It appears likely that after the initial reorganization of the Exchequer, Nigel's involvement lessened. He continued to be active, though, and obtained tax exemptions and other privileges until his death in 1169. His son, Richard fitzNeal, who is the main source for information about Nigel's career in the Exchequer, stated that he fulfilled Nigel's treasury duties when Nigel was ill. Nigel continued to spar with Robert, the Earl of Leicester, and Richard fitzNeal relays a story about Nigel and Robert confronting each other at the Exchequer over traditional exemptions of the barons of the Exchequer, or judges of the Exchequer. Among the reforms carried out by Nigel were the restoration of the "blanch farm" system, whereby a random sample of coins was assayed and any shortage was collected from the sheriff, and the restoration of collections from a swath of counties that had quit paying taxes during Stephen's reign. The most substantial change was the return to a unified system of finances, which in turn required a reconciliation of the two different systems in use by Stephen and Matilda. Despite Nigel's reinstatement to the Exchequer, and the nomination of his son as treasurer, Nigel did not enjoy the power that his uncle had wielded under Henry I. The exact date of Richard's appointment as treasurer is obscure, but it was sometime between 1158 and 1160, as he is securely attested as treasurer in 1160. The Liber Eliensis states that Nigel paid the king £400 to secure the office for Richard. Some historians have seen Nigel as Henry II's "minister of finance".

Nigel also served as a royal justice under Henry II. Although his relations with the government had improved, his relations with the monks of his cathedral chapter, which had never been good, continued to be marked by quarrels. In 1156, the English Pope Adrian IV threatened to suspend Nigel from office unless the bishop restored all the lands that had belonged to the church when Nigel became bishop. The restitution was hampered by the absence of the king from England, and the dispute dragged on until finally it was resolved by Nigel pledging in front of Theobald of Bec, Archbishop of Canterbury, to restore the lands. By 1158, Nigel had managed to restore enough possessions that Adrian relaxed the conditions. Even this did not end the quarrels with the monks, as Nigel then named a married clerk as sacrist of Ely, an action which was condemned by Thomas Becket, the new Archbishop of Canterbury. Nigel did manage to secure a reduction in the assessment of knight's fees due from the diocese, from the sixty fees that were due under Henry I to forty in 1166.

== Death and legacy ==
Nigel died on 30 May 1169. In either 1164 or in 1166, or possibly both, he had been struck by paralysis, and after this, he seems to have withdrawn from active affairs. He took little part in the disputes between the king and Thomas Becket, although he did agree with his fellow bishops who opposed the king's attempt to reduce clerical benefits. He may have been buried at Ely, where a 12th-century marble slab possibly marks his tomb. (Note: This slab, which is decorated with an image of the archangel Michael, was found in another church in Ely in 1829 and is now in the north choir aisle of Ely Cathedral. The fact that it was found outside the cathedral does not preclude it from having once been there, as the cathedral's tombs and monuments underwent two large regroupings, once in the late 17th century and again in the middle 18th century.)

Nigel was a married bishop, and his son Richard fitzNeal was later Lord Treasurer and Bishop of London. (Note: The modern biographer of Roger of Salisbury states that Richard was born before Nigel's consecration, although he gives no source for this information.) Another son was William, called William the Englishman. Richard, who wrote the Dialogus de Scaccario, or Dialogue concerning the Exchequer about the procedures of the Exchequer, had been taught those procedures by his father. Nigel's uncle Roger had at least one son, Roger, who was King Stephen's chancellor; Adelelm, who succeeded Nigel as treasurer after his first term, was probably Roger's son also. Another relative was William of Ely, who succeeded Richard fitzNeal as treasurer in 1196, although the exact relationship is unclear.

Nigel was active in draining the Fens, the swampy land around Ely, to increase the agricultural lands around his bishopric. He also fortified the Isle of Ely with stone defences, probably starting around 1140. The remains of one castle on Cherry Hill in Ely probably date to Nigel's fortifications. Early in his time as bishop he was active in recovering the church's lands that had been granted to knights by his predecessors, and soon after his consecration he ordered an inquest made into the lands actually owned by the diocese and cathedral chapter. The bishop spent most of his life in debt, but in the year he died, he managed to clear it with his son's help. The monks of his cathedral chapter did not like the fact that they were required to pay for the bishop's appeals to Rome to recover his see, or pay for regaining the king's favour. Their dislike of their bishop is evident in the Liber Eliensis. The art historian C. R. Dodwell wrote of Nigel's efforts:

When ... Nigel ... needed to raise money in order to repair his own political fortunes, he stripped down, sold, or used as security, a quite astounding number of Ely's monastic treasures. These numbered Crucifixes of gold and silver from the Anglo-Saxon past, and they included an alb with gold-embroidered apparels, given by St Æthelwold, and a chasuble, given by King Edgar, which was almost all of gold. A gold and bejewelled textile covering ... was sold to the Bishop of Lincoln, Alexander, who took it with him to Rome as a gift of particular splendour. It is a biting commentary on attitudes of the Anglo-Norman episcopy to Anglo-Saxon art, that it was left to the pope to point out that such an artistic heirloom should never have left Ely in the first place and to order its return.

Most historians have seen Nigel as an administrator, not a religious bishop. The historian David Knowles wrote that Nigel "had devoted all his energies and abilities to matters purely secular; in the department of financial administration he was supreme, and more than any other man he helped to ensure the continuity and development of the excellent administrative practice initiated under Henry I". The historian W. L. Warren said that "Stephen probably paid dearly for the dismissal of Bishop Roger of Salisbury and Bishop Nigel of Ely, for the expertise of the exchequer was lodged in their expertise." Whatever Nigel's administrative talent, his ecclesiastical abilities are generally held to be low; the Gesta Stephani says both he and Alexander were "men who loved display and were rash in their reckless presumption ... disregarding the holy and simple manner of life that befits a Christian priest they devoted themselves so utterly to warfare and the vanities of this world that whenever they attended court by appointment they ... aroused general astonishment on account of the extraordinary concourse of knights by which they were surrounded on every side."

== Citations ==
Political offices
New title	Lord High Treasurer c. 1126	Succeeded by Adelelm
Preceded by Adelelm	Lord High Treasurer c. 1154 – c. 1158	Succeeded by Richard FitzNeal
Catholic Church titles
Preceded by Hervey le Breton	Bishop of Ely; 1133–1169	Succeeded by Geoffrey Ridel
