= John Marchesinus =

Italian Franciscan friar

John Marchesinus (called in Latin Johannes Marchesinus and in Italian Giovanni Marchesini) was an Italian Franciscan friar, probably of the late thirteenth and early fourteenth centuries, who was the author of religious works.

Little is known of Marchesinus, apart from what is said in his own work. Even the date of his life is uncertain and in the words of P. S. Allen "has been put both at 1300 and at 1466".

His Mammotrectus super Bibliam, written at Reggio Emilia probably towards the end of the 13th century, was an etymological analysis of the Vulgate, the Latin Bible. There were at that time many priests who were barely literate, and Marchesinus declared himself to be "impatient with his own lack of skill, and compassionate towards the rudeness of poor clerics promoted to the office of preaching". In view of that, he wrote to "edify their understanding with etymology".

In his Confessionale, compiled around 1300 and called a "little work", the first thing Marchesinus considers is the correct setting for a confession, advising that "The priest hearing confession should sit in a public and honourable place, lest, if this be wanting, he may appear to be an adulterer".

== Works ==
- Mammotrectus super Bibliam (Martin Flac, Strasbourg, 1494), full text of 1494 online at uni-duesseldorf.de
