= Roger Niger =

13th-century Bishop of London

- Bishop of London
- Elected: 1228
- Term ended: 29 September 1241
- Predecessor: Eustace of Fauconberg
- Successor: Fulk Basset
- Other post: Archdeacon of Colchester

Orders
- Consecration: 10 June 1229

Personal details
- Born: c. 1173 probably Maldon, Essex
- Died: 29 September 1241 London
- Denomination: Catholic

Roger Niger (died 1241) was a thirteenth-century cleric who became Bishop of London. He is also known as Saint Roger of Beeleigh.

== Life ==
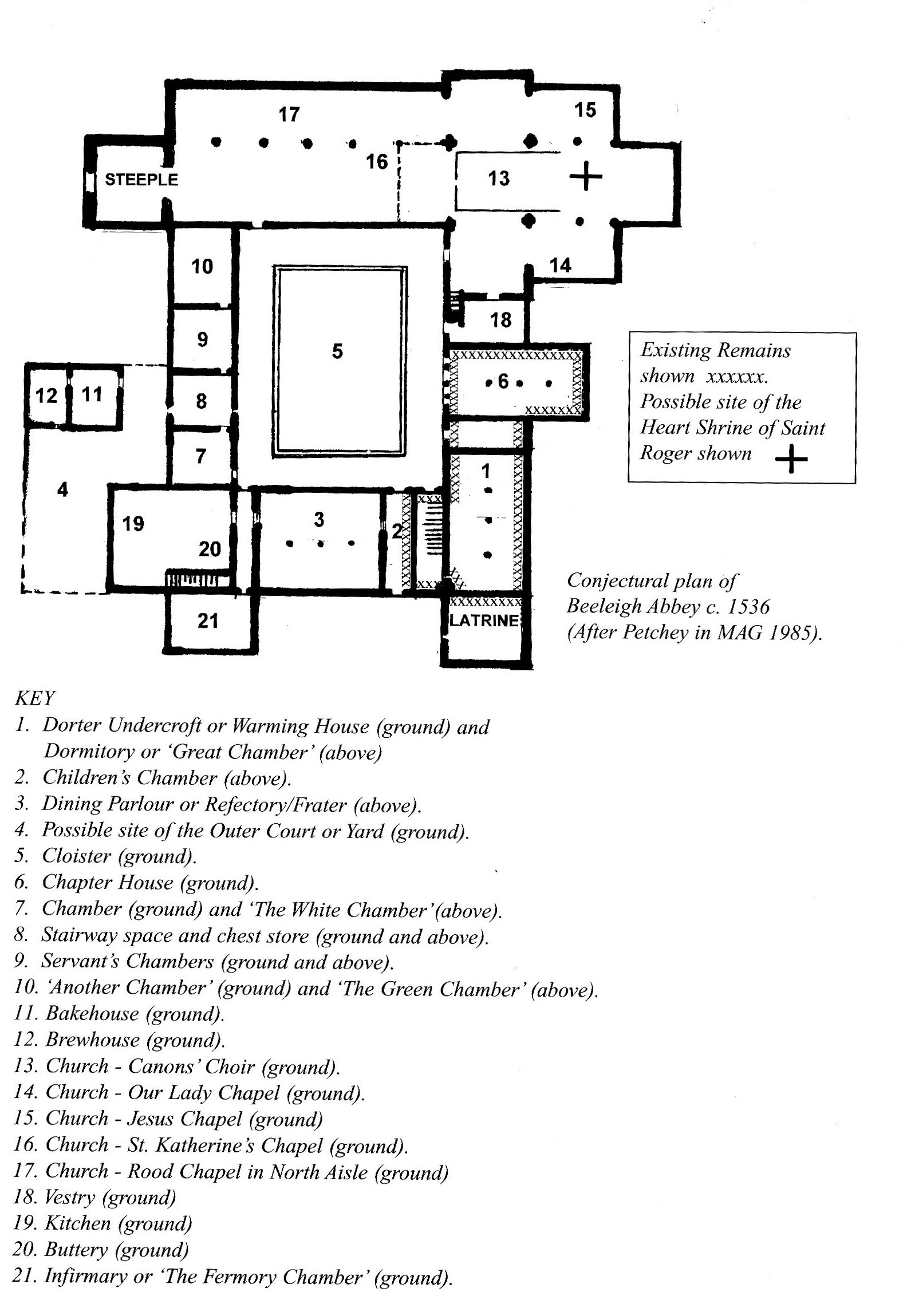
A plan of Beeleigh Abbey in Essex, showing the location of the shrine that housed Saint Roger's heart

In 1192 Niger was named a canon of St Paul's Cathedral, London, and he held the prebend of Ealdland in the diocese of London. In 1218 he was promoted to Archdeacon of Colchester. He was elected Bishop of London in 1228, and was consecrated bishop on 10 June 1229.

Niger died on 29 September 1241 or on 2 October 1241 and during his burial in Old St Paul's Cathedral, there was an eclipse of the sun. There was a tomb memorial to him in the quire there. His heart was taken to Beeleigh Abbey near Maldon in Essex. Both sites became places of pilgrimage and he was referred to as a saint, although no formal canonisation has been located. He was, however, called a saint by at least one Pope. In 1391, Pope Boniface IX granted relaxation to penitents visiting and giving alms to Beeleigh Abbey on the anniversary of his death.

== Citations ==
Catholic Church titles
Preceded by Eustace of Fauconberg	Bishop of London; 1228–1241	Succeeded by Fulk Basset
