= Mainz Psalter =

Second major book printed with movable type in the West

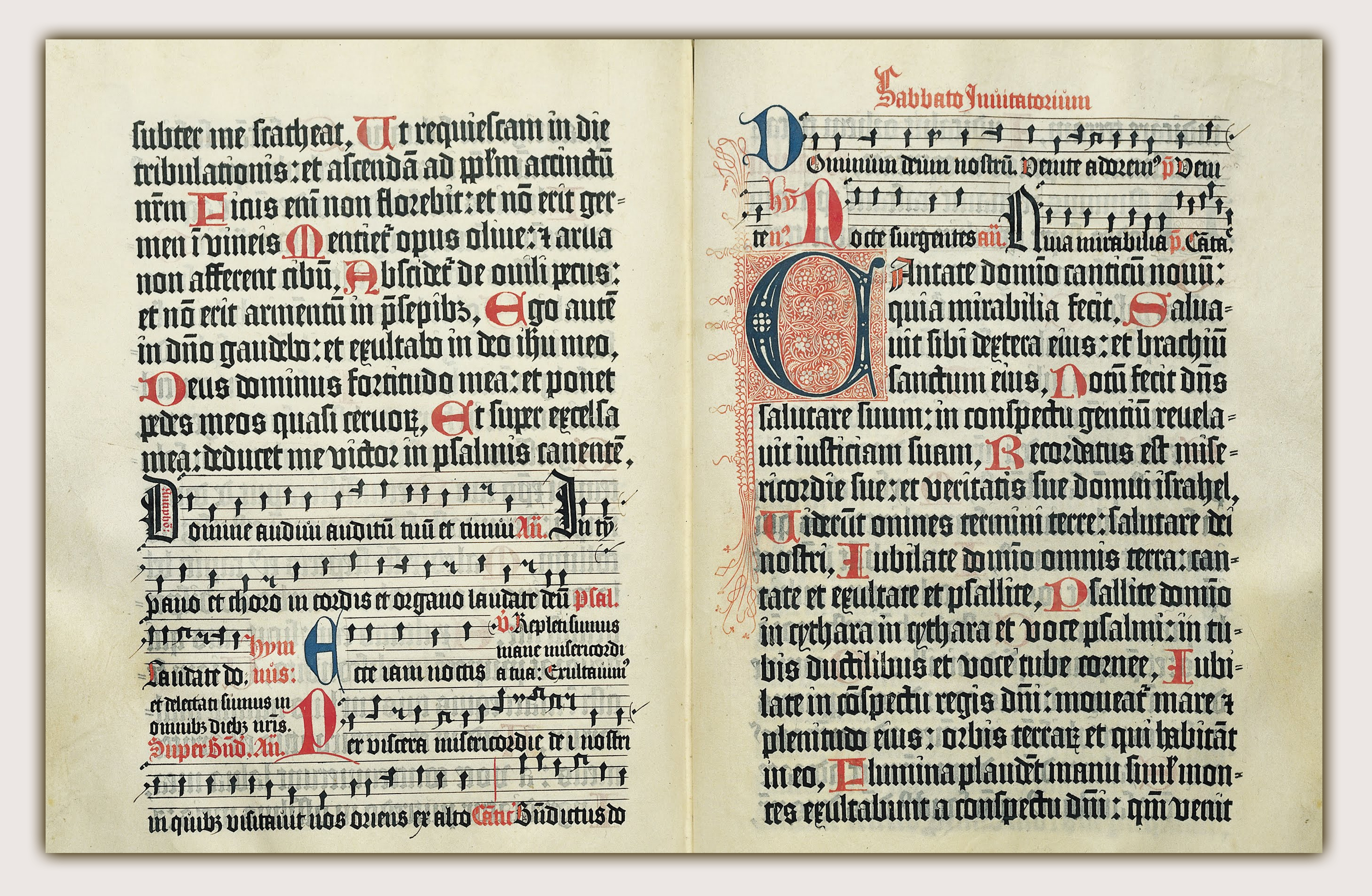
Opening (Royal Collection)

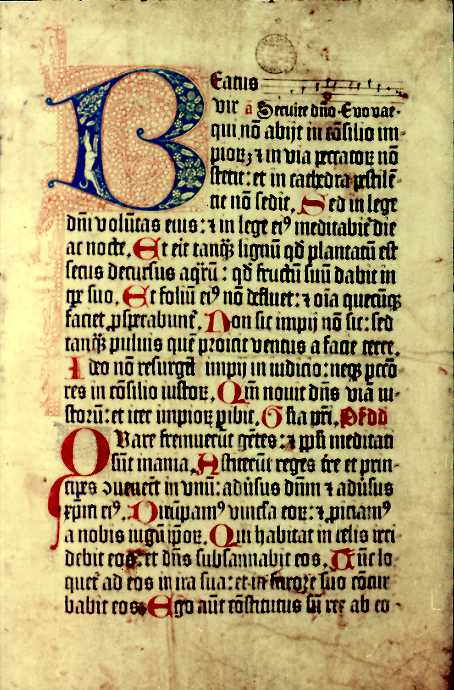
From the 1459 second edition : with an illuminated letter

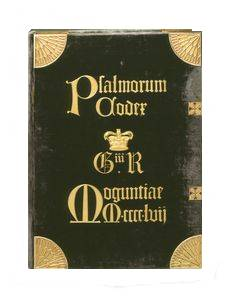
The Mainz Psalter (1457) of George III, rebound in 1800

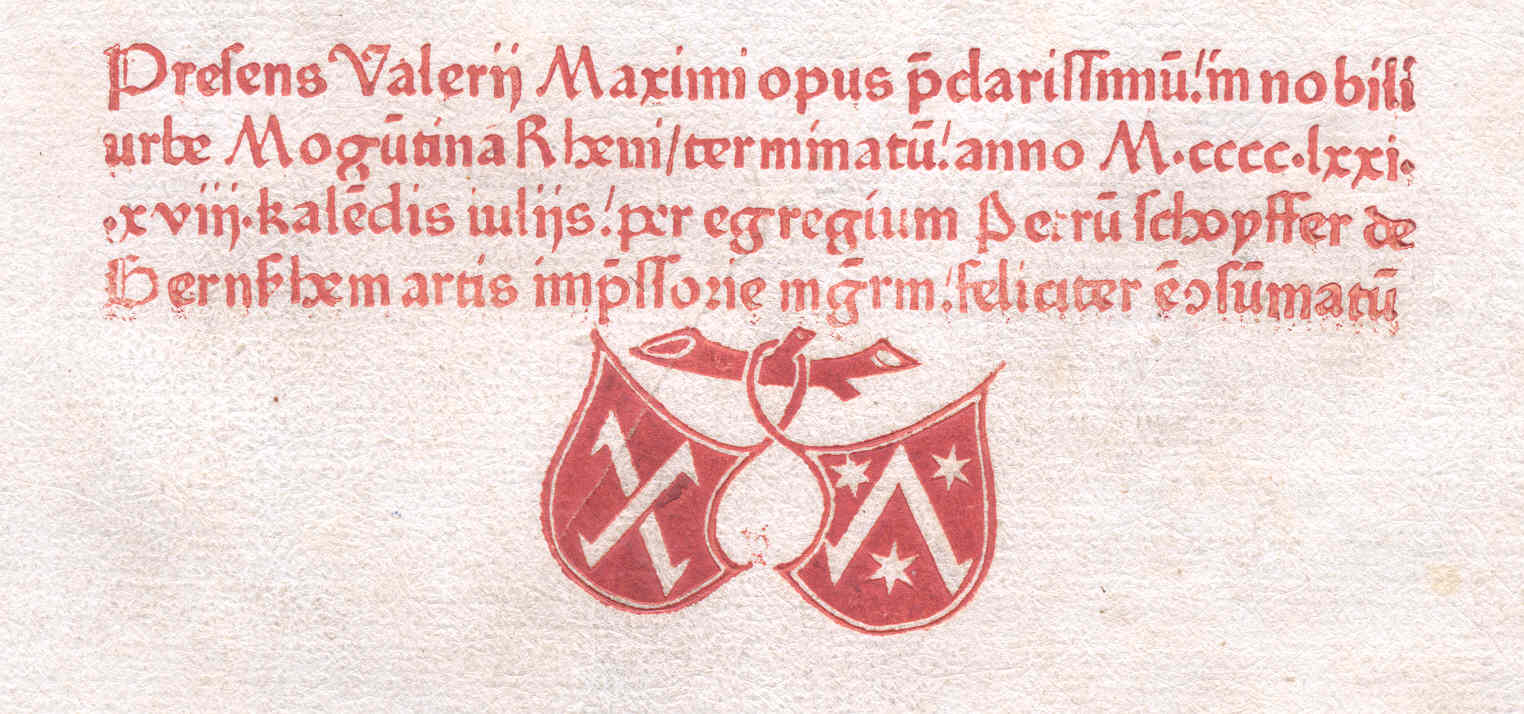
Printer's mark of Johann Fust and Peter Schoeffer

The Mainz Psalter was the second major book printed with movable type in the West; the first was the Gutenberg Bible. It is a psalter commissioned by the Mainz archbishop in 1457. The Psalter introduced several innovations: it was the first book to feature a printed date of publication, a printed colophon, two sizes of type, printed decorative initials, and the first to be printed in three colours. The colophon also contains the first example of a printer's mark. It was the first important publication issued by Johann Fust and Peter Schoeffer following their split from Johannes Gutenberg.

== Description ==
The Psalter combines printed text with two-colour woodcuts: since both woodcuts and movable print are relief processes, they could be printed together on the same press. The Psalter is printed using black and red inks, with the smaller initials in red. The larger coloured capitals are done by hand in blue and red inks. Some initials combine printing and hand-drawing, and according to Mayumi Ikeda, some even include elements of intaglio engraving. These capitals were partly the work of the artisan known as the Fust master, who later also worked for Fust and Schöffer on the 1462 Bible. The musical score accompanying the psalms was provided in manuscript, and may have been the model for the type style. Printing in two colours, although feasible on the moveable press of Gutenberg's time (as illustrated by the Mainz Psalter), was apparently abandoned soon afterward as being too time-consuming, as few other examples of such a process are extant.

Two versions were printed, the short issue and long issue. The short has 143 leaves, and the long has 175 and was intended for use in the diocese of Mainz. All surviving copies and fragments are on vellum, and it is not known if any paper copies were printed. At least one copy was still being used in services in a monastery in the mid-eighteenth century.

== Date ==
The Psalter is the earliest European book with a printed date of publication, though not the first printed book to feature a date associated with its production: in August 1456 the binder and rubricator of a copy of the Gutenberg Bible added handwritten dates to show when these tasks were completed.

The colophon can be translated as follows:

- This volume of the Psalms, adorned with a magnificence of capital letters and clearly divided by rubrics, has been fashioned by a mechanical process of printing and producing characters, without use of a pen, and it was laboriously completed, for God's Holiness, by Joachim Fust, citizen of Mainz, and Peter Schoeffer of Gernsheim, on Assumption Eve [August 14] in the year of Our Lord, 1457.

New editions, using the same type, were printed in 1459 (dated August 29), 1490, 1502 (Schöffer's last publication) and 1516.

== Surviving copies ==
It is "the second printed book ever published, and the first with rubricated (red as well as black) printing". There are only ten copies in existence, and as such, this book is rarer than the Gutenberg Bible.

Many fragments also survive. The ten known copies of the 1457 edition are listed below:

- Berlin State Library. Long issue
- Saxon State Library, Dresden. Long issue. Looted during World War II and taken to the US, until returned in 1950.
- Darmstadt University and Public Library. Short issue
- Austrian National Library. Long issue. In 2011 this was added by UNESCO to its Memory of the World International Register, recognising it as documentary heritage of global importance.
- French National Library, Paris. Long issue. From St Victor in Mainz.
- Municipal Library, Angers. Short issue
- British Library, London. Short issue. Bequeathed by Thomas Grenville. On display in the Sir John Ritblat Gallery
- Royal Library, Windsor. Short issue. Acquired by George III from the University of Göttingen.
- John Rylands Library, Manchester. Short issue. Bought from 5th Earl Spencer in 1892. Earlier bought by 2nd Earl Spencer from the German monastery of Rot an der Rot in 1798.
- Scheide Library, Princeton University, New Jersey. Long issue, but missing ff. 143-175. Also from St Victor in Mainz.

== See also ==
- Incunable
