= William of Sainte-Mère-Église =

13th-century Bishop of London

- Bishop of London
- Elected: 16 September 1198
- Term ended: 25 January 1221 resigned
- Predecessor: Richard FitzNeal
- Successor: Eustace of Fauconberg
- Other post: Dean of St Martin le Grand

Orders
- Consecration: 23 May 1199

Personal details
- Died: 27 March 1224
- Denomination: Catholic

William of Sainte-Mère-Église (Note: Or William de St Mariæ Ecclesiâ or William of Saint Mere Eglise) was a medieval Bishop of London.

== Life ==
William's family originated from Sainte-Mère-Église, in the Cotentin Peninsula, Normandy, and he held the prebend of 'Ealdstreet' in the diocese of London, as well as being dean of St Martin le Grand in London. He also held a prebend in the diocese of York.

In 1193, William, along with the bishop of Salisbury Hubert Walter, found King Richard I of England where he was being held captive at Ochsenfurt in Germany. He was also named the clerk of the exchequer who was responsible for overseeing the Jewish moneylenders, and worked in Walter's new system of supervision to reduce fraud.

William was elected to the See of London on 16 September 1198 and consecrated on 23 May 1199. He resigned the see on 25 January 1221 and retired to the Augustinian St Osyth's Priory in Essex. He died on 27 March 1224.

== Citations ==
Catholic Church titles
Preceded by Richard FitzNeal	Bishop of London; 1198–1221	Succeeded by Eustace of Fauconberg
