= Minor Canons of St Paul's =

Ecclesiastical title for Christian positions

Coordinates: 51°30′49″N 0°5′54″W

The Minor Canons of St Paul's Cathedral, London, whose origins predate the Norman conquest of England, unusually were independent of the senior canons and – being priests – were of higher status than the lay vicars choral. Medieval Hereford furnishes the only other example of such an office.

There were three full-time clergy at St. Paul's who were part of its ministry and mission team but not members of the cathedral chapter. Notwithstanding the abolition of the college, there remain two minor canons: the succentor and the sacrist. They organise and take part in services in the cathedral, with particular areas of specialist responsibility such as ceremony, music, liturgy, and daily services. The chaplain is responsible for the pastoral care of the cathedral. The role of chaplain is not that of a minor canon but is in the newly established category of priest vicar.

Minor canons and priest vicar (as of July 2024)
succentor	minor canon	Robert Kozak	since 23 February 2022
sacrist	minor canon	Robert Coupland	since 6 October 2019
chaplain	priest vicar	Paula Hollingsworth	since 14 February 2020

== History ==
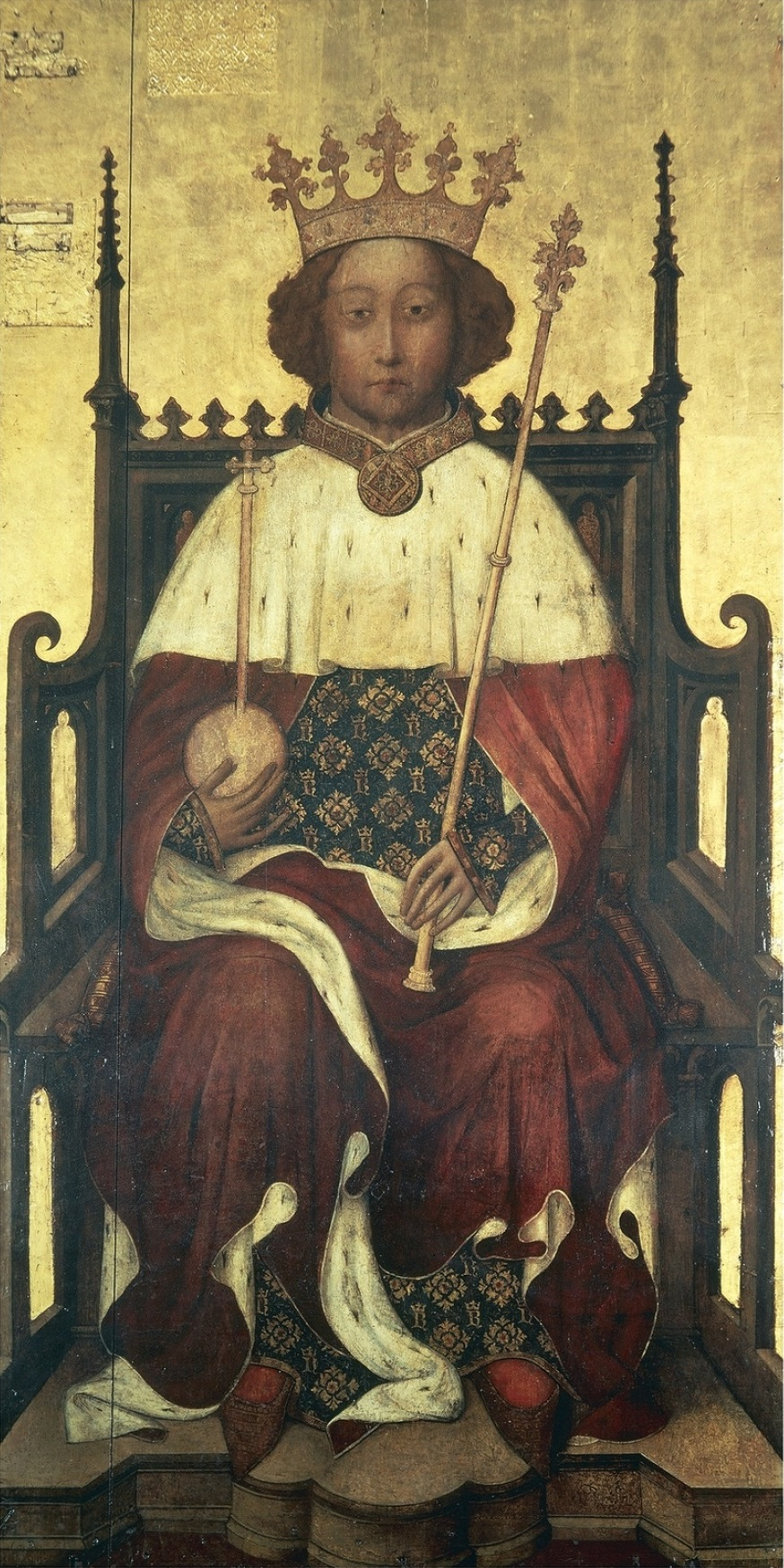
In 1396, Richard II of England authorised statutes to govern the college of minor canons

The College of Minor Canons (up to 12 men) lived according to a rule and from 1353 possessed a hall where they gathered daily for an evening meal. In 1378 the minor canons petitioned Pope Urban VI for a grant confirming their "ancient" privileges, and in 1396 Richard II authorised statutes to govern the college of minor canons at St. Paul's.

The 1396 statutes (which probably merely reflected contemporary practice) provided for the election by the minor canons each June of a warden, who was to govern the college in association with his senior brethren, among them the junior and senior cardinals.

Whenever a vacancy arose in the college, the remaining members were to nominate two persons, from whom the dean and chapter made their selection. Prospective minor canons were to be

"worthy, sufficient and meet men, not only in reading and singing, but also and especially in honesty of life and godliness of conversation".

Upon election each new minor canon was required to present a silver spoon to the college, worth at least five shillings.

To avoid scandal, canons were forbidden to bring women into the college precincts or to visit taverns in their company. Transgressors faced expulsion for a third offence.

Hospitality was limited, for any legitimate guests at dinner were to pay a sum set by the warden "as the dearth or plenty of victuals then requires". Tranquillity was also important, for there was to be no noise in minor canons' residences after 9:00 pm. Sanitation was a constant concern, with a ha'penny fine for any minor canon who did

"cast filth ... [or] make water within the gates except it be in the place appointed for that purpose".

These statutes of 1396 were confirmed by successive monarchs, as by Henry VII in 1487 and Elizabeth I in 1566. In 1840 an Act of Parliament, known as the St. Paul's Cathedral Minor Canonries Act reduced the number of minor canons to six, with one warden and a senior and junior cardinal among them. In the early 21st century, the college was reduced to three priests and no laypersons: chaplain, sacrist, and succentor. The College of Minor Canons of St. Paul's Cathedral, and the two historic titles "senior cardinal" and "junior cardinal", were abolished with effect from 1 February 2016. (Note: The former College of Minor Canons and the former titles of Senior and Junior Cardinal were abolished in the Constitution and Statutes made by Instrument under the Common Seal of the Cathedral Church of St Paul in London on 1 February 2016 and coming into effect on that date. The consent of the Council was confirmed on 18 December 2015 under the hand of the Chairman. The Bishop of London gave his consent on 20 January 2016. A draft (only) of the amended measures appears in the working document referred to above.)

=== Cardinals ===
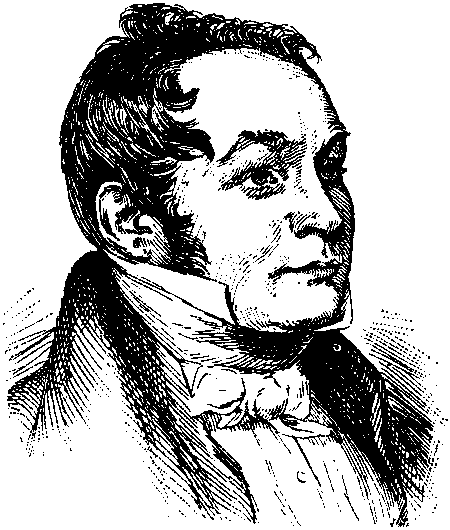
Sketch of Richard Harris Barham, who served as cardinal in the 1820s

In the Church of England, the title "cardinal" was, prior to the abolition of the college, applied to the two senior members of the College of Minor Canons of St. Paul's Cathedral, who were known as the senior cardinal and junior cardinal. The use of the term predates the English Reformation and in 1898 a complete list of the cardinals up to that time appeared in print. The final cardinals in post on 1 February 2016, were Rosemary Morton (succentor since November 2014) and James Milne (sacrist since 7 February 2015). The cardinal rector of St Magnus-the-Martyr Church by London Bridge is thought to be the only cleric now entitled to use the title "cardinal" in the Church of England. Given that women are never made cardinals of the Roman church, women who served as minor canons of St. Paul's and who were entitled to the "cardinal" designation were the only women to be called cardinals.

=== History of the title ===
This use of "cardinal" as a rank dates back to before when the term assumed its present meaning as a high official of the Catholic Church. Originally, it could be applied to any priest permanently assigned or incardinated to a church.

A papal grant of Urban VI (1378) referred to duo deputati ab antiquo, qui cardinales vocantur, (Note: two deputies, of antique [offices], who are called "cardinals" [= permanently appointed]) the two who took a leading role in the affairs of the college. Their duties according to the statutes of the cathedral of 1396 were "continually to visit the sick and minister unto them as often as shall be needful". The two Cardinals of the choir enjoyed fees from funerals and anniversary masses sung in the cathedral. They were consulted on liturgical matters, as on the suitability of the office hymn Verbum supernum at the time of the introduction of the Sarum Rite at St. Paul's in the mid-15th century. Their duty to celebrate at the high altar in place of the dean and canons was unique to St. Paul's. Moreover, the junior cardinal had special responsibility for visiting the sick and ministering the sacrament to them: A dangerous duty at times when the city was infected by plague and disease. In reward, the two cardinals enjoyed a double allowance of money, bread, and ale from the college common funds. The Victorian poet R.H. Barham held one of these offices.
