= Pipe rolls =

Medieval and post-medieval financial documents

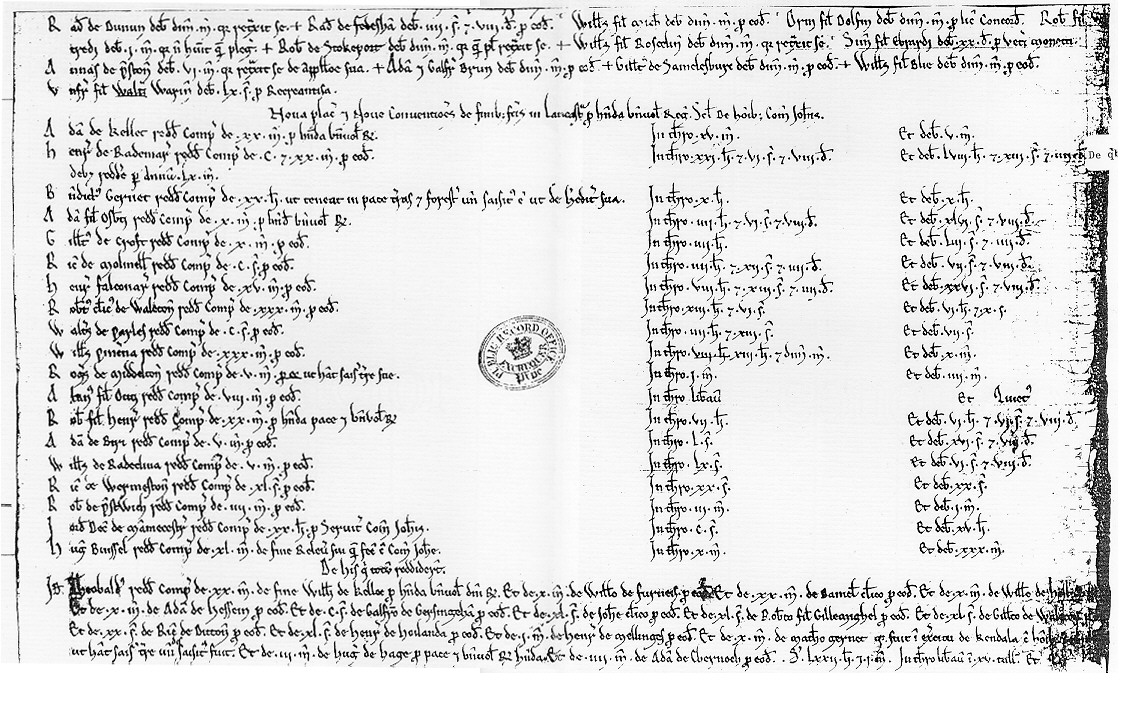
- Extract from the 1194 pipe roll
- Language: Medieval Latin, Middle English, English
- Date: 1129–1833
- Provenance: English Exchequer; Exchequer of Ireland
- Series: Pipe rolls
- Genre: Accounting documents
- Subject: Records of the audits of the English Exchequer and Exchequer of Ireland
- Period covered: 1130–1833

The pipe rolls, sometimes called the Great Rolls or the Great Rolls of the Pipe, are a collection of financial records maintained by the English Exchequer, or Treasury, and its successors, as well as the Exchequer of Ireland. They record not only payments made to the government, but debts owed to the crown and disbursements made by royal officials. The earliest date from the 12th century, and the series extends, mostly complete, from then until 1833. They form the oldest continuous series of records concerning English governance kept by the English, British, Irish, and United Kingdom governments, and cover a span of some 700 years.

They were the records of the yearly audits performed by the Exchequer of the accounts and payments presented to the Treasury by the sheriffs and other royal officials. They owed their name to the shape they took, as the various sheets were affixed to each other and then rolled into a tight roll, resembling a pipe, for storage. Although they recorded much of the royal income, they did not record all types of income, nor did they record all expenditures, so they are not strictly speaking a budget.

The early medieval pipe rolls are especially useful for historical study, as they are some of the earliest financial records available from the Middle Ages. A similar set of records was developed for Normandy, which was ruled by the English kings from 1066 to 1205, but the Norman pipe rolls have not survived in a continuous series like the English.

The Pipe Roll Society, formed in 1883, has published the pipe rolls for the period up to 1224.

== Composition ==
The pipe rolls are named after the "pipe" shape formed by the rolled-up parchments on which the records were originally written. There is no evidence to support the theory that they were named pipes for the fact that they "piped" the money into the Treasury, nor for the claim that they got their name from resembling a wine cask, or pipe of wine. They were occasionally referred to as the roll of the treasury, or the great roll of accounts, and the great roll of the pipe.

The pipe rolls are the records of the audits of the sheriffs' accounts, usually conducted at Michaelmas by the Exchequer, or English treasury. Until the chancery records began in the reign of King John of England, they were the only continuous set of records kept by the English government. They are not a complete record of government and royal finances, however, as they do not record all sources of income, only the accounts of the sheriffs and a few other sources of income. Some of the payments that did not regularly fall under the Exchequer were occasionally recorded in a pipe roll. Neither do the pipe rolls record all payments made by the exchequer. They were not created as a budget, nor were they strictly speaking records of receipts, but rather they are records of the audit of the accounts rendered. Although the rolls use an accounting system, it is not one that would be familiar to modern accountants; for instance until the end of the 12th century, no record was made of the total amount taken in by the sheriff of each shire. In their early form, they record all debts owed to the Crown, whether from feudal dues or from other sources. Given that many debts to the king were allowed to be paid off in instalments, it is necessary to search more than one set of rolls for a complete history of a debt. If a debt was not paid off completely in one year, the remainder of the amount owed was transferred to the next year. They did not record the full amount of debts incurred in previous years, only what was paid that year and what was still owed. Besides the sheriffs, others who submitted accounts for the audit included some bailiffs of various honours, town officials, and the custodians of ecclesiastical and feudal estates.

The earliest surviving pipe roll, already in a mature form, dates from 1130–31, (Note: The Pipe Roll of 31 Henry I is "the earliest surviving comprehensive account of royal income in European history" according to C. Warren Hollister) and the continuous series begins in 1155–56, and continued for almost seven hundred years.

Combined with the Domesday Book of 1086, the pipe rolls contributed to the centralisation of financial records by the Norman kings (reigned 1066–1154) of England that was ahead of contemporary Western European monarchies; the French, for instance, did not have an equivalent system of accounting until the 1190s. The exact form of the records, kept in a roll instead of a book, was also unique to England, although why England kept some of its administrative records in this form is unclear. A set of Norman rolls, drafted differently, are extant in a few years for the reigns of Kings Henry II (reigned 1154–1189) and Richard I (reigned 1189–1199), who also ruled the Duchy of Normandy in France. It is believed that the Norman rolls were started about the same time as the English, but due to lack of survival of the earlier Norman rolls, it is unclear exactly when they did start. An Irish Exchequer produced Irish pipe rolls, and much like the English pipe rolls, the earliest surviving Irish pipe roll, that of 1212, does not appear to be the first produced.

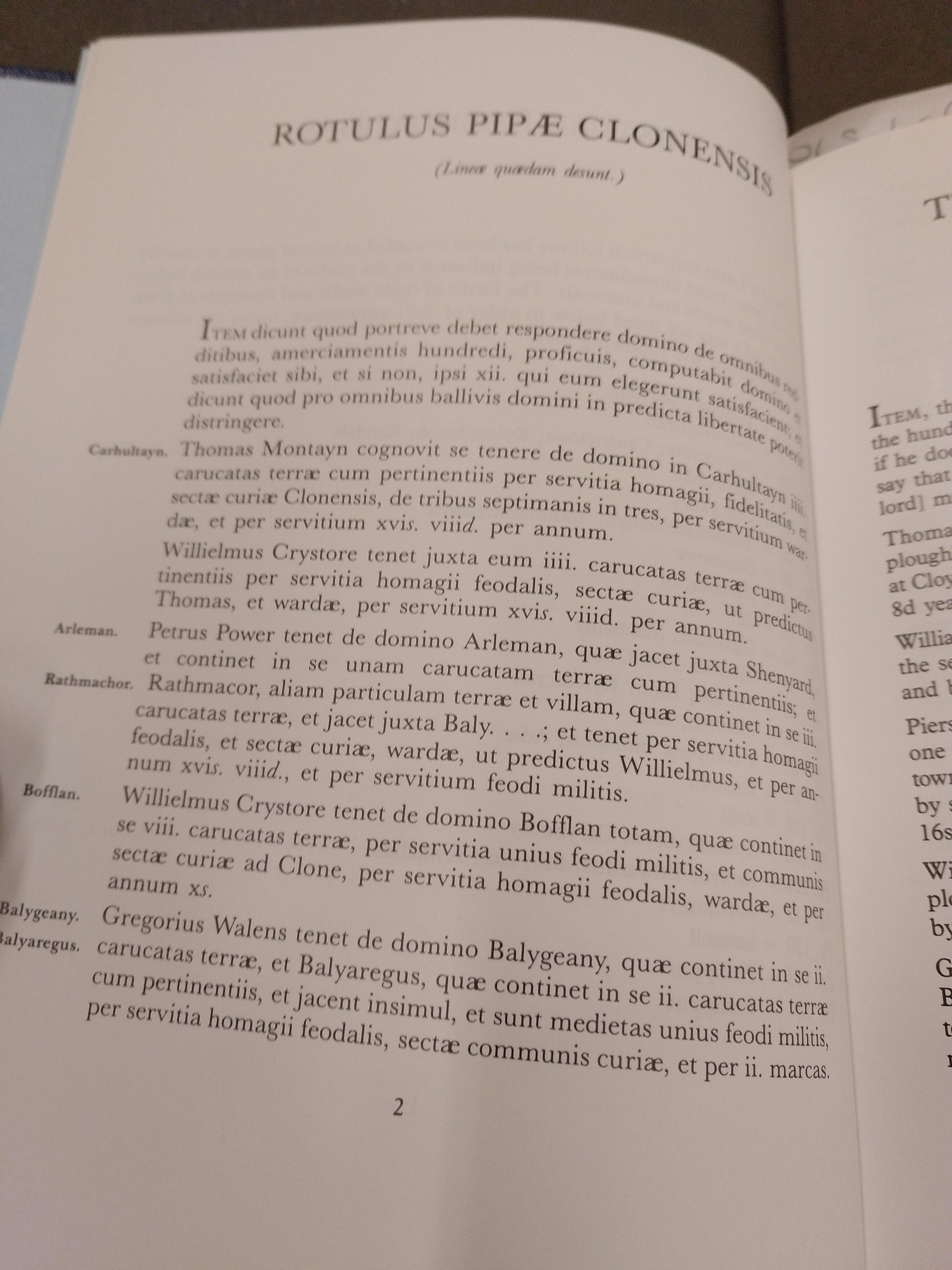
Extract from the pipe rolls of Cloyne, Ireland, for the year 1354.

The Dialogus de Scaccario or Dialogue concerning the Exchequer, written in about 1178, details the workings of the Exchequer and gives an early account of how the pipe rolls were created. The Dialogue was written by Richard FitzNeal, the son of Nigel of Ely, who was Treasurer for both Henry I and Henry II of England. According to the Dialogue, the pipe rolls were the responsibility of the clerk of the Treasurer, who was called the Clerk of the Pipe and later the clerk of the pells. FitzNeal wrote his work to explain the inner workings of the Exchequer, and in it he lists a number of different types of rolls used by the Treasury. He also describes the creation of the pipe rolls and how they are used. The Dialogue also states that the pipe rolls, along with Domesday Book and other records, were kept in the treasury, because they were required for daily use by the Exchequer clerks.

The main source of income recorded on the pipe rolls was the county farm, or income derived from lands held by the king. Occasional sources of revenue, such as from vacant bishoprics or abbeys or other sources, were also recorded. The payments were made both in coin, or in objects, such as spurs, lands, spices, or livestock. The only surviving roll from Henry I's reign also records payments of geld, a form of land tax dating from Anglo-Saxon times, although after 1161 the pipe rolls no longer record any payments of geld. (Note: Whether geld was abolished in 1161 or later is a matter of debate among historians.) By 1166, the fines and other monetary income of the Assizes, or royal courts, began to be recorded in the pipe rolls. Scutage payments, made by knights in lieu of military service, were also recorded in the pipe rolls from the reign of Henry II on. (Note: It is unclear if the recording of scutage in the pipe rolls was an innovation during Henry II's reign, or if it is just mischance that the lone surviving pipe roll prior to his reign does not record any scutage payments. The 1130 pipe roll does allude to scutage payments, it just does not record any payment made.)

Although they recorded all income that came through the Exchequer, not all sources of income went through that office, so the pipe rolls are not a complete record of royal income. They did include both regular income from the royal lands and judicial profits, as well as more occasional income derived from feudal levies, wardships, and ecclesiastical vacancies. Another source of income recorded in the rolls was from feudal reliefs, the payment made by an heir when inheriting an estate. A major source of income in the roll of 1130 is from the forests, under the Forest Law, which was the royal law covering the restrictions imposed on non-royals hunting in areas of the country declared royal forest. However, royal income from taxation that was not annually assessed was not usually recorded in the pipe rolls, nor were his receipts from lands outside England. Some payments went directly to the king's household, and because they did not pass through the Exchequer, they were not recorded in the pipe rolls.

Expenditures were also subject to documentation in the pipe rolls. Among the recorded expenditures are payments for carts and cart horses, wages for royal servants, payments for improvements to royal manors and houses, royal gifts to persons, hunting expenses, payments to acquire a governmental office, payments to mercenaries, and the costs of bags and casks to transport silver pennies about the kingdom.

Information about other subjects besides revenues also is contained in the rolls, including the movement of prisoners, which helps to identify which medieval castles were used as prisons. The pipe rolls also allow the identification of the custodians of royal lands and castles. The clerks writing the rolls also used them as places to deride officials of the government, such as William Longchamp, who was the object of derision in the 1194 pipe roll.

Certain areas did not report their income to the Exchequer, so they do not usually appear in the pipe rolls, unless the lands were in the king's custody through a vacancy. These included the palatinates of Durham and Chester. The county of Cornwall also did not usually appear in the pipe rolls, but it was not a palatinate. Another problem with using the pipe rolls for historical study is the fact that the chronological limits for the financial year varied from roll to roll. In theory, they only recorded revenues from the previous Easter to Michaelmas of that financial year. However, the pipe rolls often record payments made past Michaelmas, often up until the date the roll was actually compiled. Also, a few debts were not audited annually, but would instead have a number of consecutive years be investigated in one sitting and thus several years of payments would be recorded in one pipe roll.

== History ==
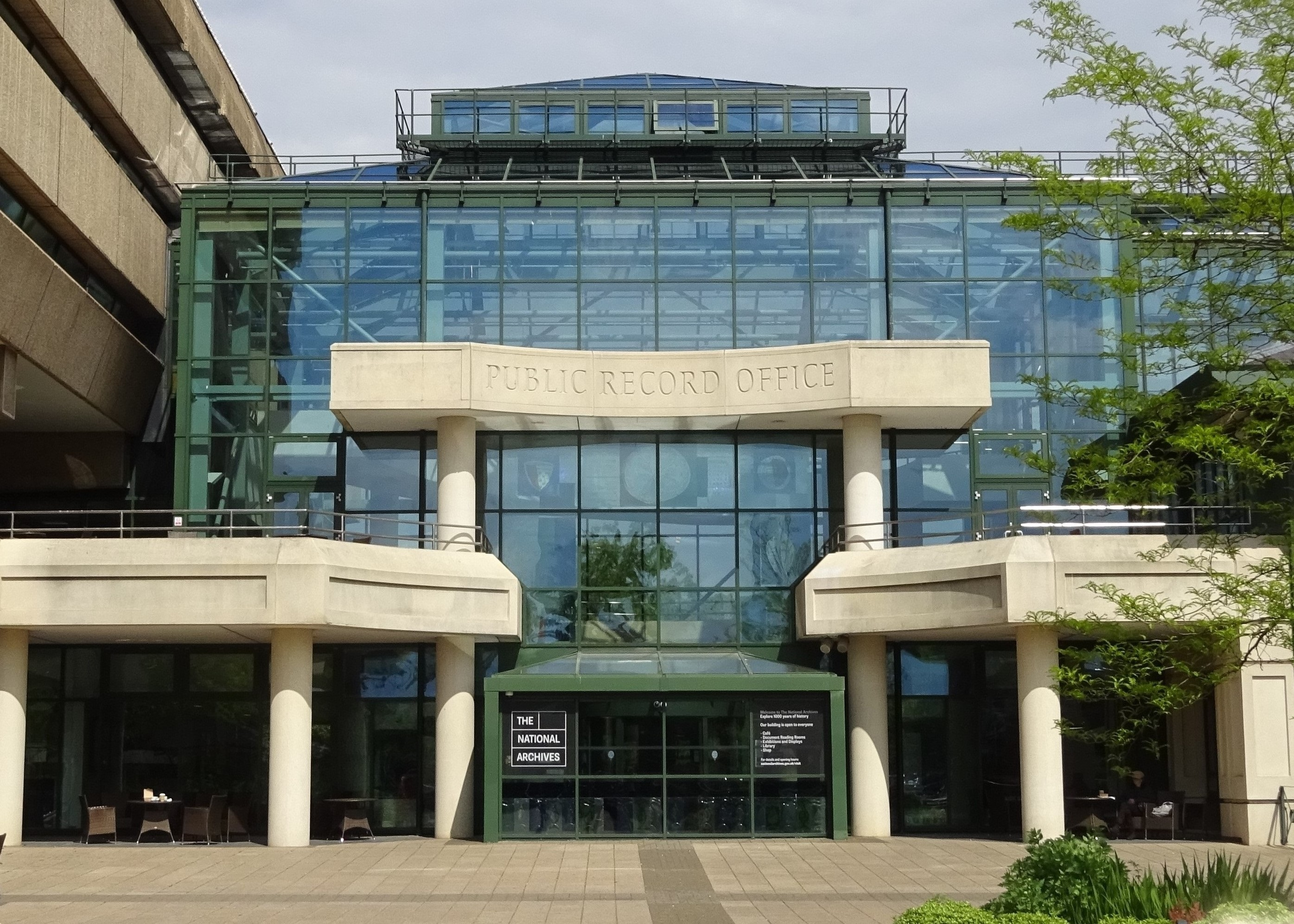
Entrance to The National Archives, where the pipe rolls are now held

Although the earliest pipe roll dates from 1130, the 31st year of King Henry I's reign, it is clear that they were being produced by the Exchequer before then, as the 1130 roll is not an experiment. It shows no hesitancy in its use of accounts, or lack of continuity from previous years. An extract from an earlier pipe roll, from the 25th regnal year of Henry I or 1124, has been found in a 14th-century manuscript now in the Cotton Library at the British Library. (Note: The extract is very short, but it shows that the pipe rolls already recorded exemptions from danegeld. It is currently manuscript Tiberius E.vi part i.) The exact time of the first production of pipe rolls is debated amongst historians. Some hold that they date from Henry I's reign, whether early or late in the reign, but others feel that they were introduced by King William I (reigned 1066–1087). The precursors of the records probably date to the Anglo-Saxon period, as the historian Pauline Stafford argues that financial records must have been kept in some form during the reigns of Cnut (reigned 1016–1035), Æthelred II (reigned 978–1016), and Edgar the Peaceable (reigned 959–975). There is a reference to the king's "rolls" in a writ from 1110, which purports to be a grant from Henry I to the abbot of Westminster of ten shillings, but the writ may be a forgery, or parts of it may be genuine with some interpolations. The writ only exists in a copy in a later cartulary, and the Abbey of Westminster is also known to have forged a number of other writs or charters, so the writ is not a solid source for royal rolls being kept as early as 1110.

After the one surviving roll from Henry I's reign, no further pipe rolls survived from his reign, nor are any preserved from the reign of his successor, King Stephen (reigned 1135–1154). But by the second year of King Henry II's reign, or 1155, they once more survive. It is unclear whether pipe rolls were actually created during Stephen's reign and did not survive, or whether the conditions during Stephen's reign precluded the creation of pipe rolls. Continuously from the early years of King Henry II's reign, most pipe rolls survive, with only a break in the last years of King John's reign (reigned 1199–1216). (Note: The 1213 roll does not exist, and the 1215 roll was compiled after John's death and is not contemporary with the actual financial investigation carried out in that year.)

The surviving pipe roll from 1130 records an income of £24,500. This figure is dwarfed by the amount recorded on the pipe roll that was actually owed to the king, which totals £68,850. The income that they record in the early years of Henry II is much smaller than that of the one surviving year for Henry I. Those early pipe rolls of Henry I record an income about £10,000 to £15,000. By the end of Henry II's reign, royal income recorded in the pipe rolls had risen to £20,000. The end of John's reign saw a recorded income of about £30,000, but Henry III's reign recorded only £8,000 in the early years, rising to £16,500 by 1225. Not only do the rolls from the early years of Henry II's reign show less income reaching the Exchequer than during Henry I's reign, those early rolls were haphazard and not as accurate and detailed as rolls dating from the later part of the reign. Nor are they as carefully produced as either the later rolls or the roll of 1130.

By the time of King John, the pipe rolls were growing unwieldy, as too many fines and fees were being recorded, making the finding of information in the rolls difficult. Eventually, after some experimentation, by 1206 a system was settled on whereby the actual detailed receipts were recorded in a set of receipt rolls and only aggregates were entered in the pipe rolls. A further reform in 1236 resulted in debts being recorded in separate Estreat rolls, and only the totals entered into the pipe rolls. In 1284 the Statutes of Rhuddlan were issued, which further reformed the accounting systems, and further reduced the detail contained on the pipe rolls. At this time, a large number of unrecoverable debts were also removed from the rolls, a process that had also been attempted in 1270. The attempt in 1270 had marked old debts with a "d" and stipulated that they were not to be re-entered into future pipe rolls unless they were paid off. But this had not worked, and so in 1284 old debts were to be recorded on a separate roll. The statutes in 1284 also laid out a procedure where debtors whose documentation of payment of debt that hadn't been accepted in the past would have that documentation accepted, thus helping to clear out some of the backlogged debts on the books.

Yet more extraneous details were removed from the pipe rolls under the Cowick Ordinance of June 1323, along with further ordinances in 1324 and 1326, all of which were done during the time that Walter de Stapledon held the office of Treasurer. Prior to this reform the rolls had become clogged with debts, and clauses 2 through 8 of the Cowick Ordinance attempted to return the rolls to an exposition of accounts. Another attempted reform at this time was the removal of customs receipts, as well as military accounts, from the rolls. New offices in the Exchequer were also created, in an attempt to speed up the auditing process and lessen the time it took to prepare the pipe rolls and other financial records. The attempt to remove non-Exchequer accounts did completely remove those types of records from the pipe rolls; further reforms in 1368 created a set of foreign rolls, and all extraneous records in the pipe rolls were transferred to those rolls.

In 1462, the Exchequer was told to no longer summon for audit any farms or feefarms worth over 40 shillings per year, as these would be supervised by a newly appointed board of receivers or approvers.

The series of pipe rolls ended in 1834 when the office that was in charge of their creation, the Pipe Office, was abolished.

== Creation ==
They were created by taking the shire, or other governmental districts, accounts and writing them on two strips of parchment, usually about 14 inches (36 cm) wide. The two pieces were then attached end to end to form one long sheet. Then, the various sheets from all the shires were piled together and affixed together at the top, and the resulting document would be rolled into a tight roll resembling a pipe. They were not formed into one long continuous roll, as the Patent Rolls were, however. The sheets for each county have a heading at the top giving the name of the county the account is for, in Latin. If more than one sheet was required for a county, the county name would be amended on secondary sheets to indicate the order the sheets were in.

Sometimes they are referred to, in Latin, as magnus rotulus pipae. Several sources for the actual idea of making the rolls as rolls have been suggested, including Jews, Adelard of Bath, who was a royal clerk and was familiar with Arabic practices of using rolls, or the royal clerk Thurkil, who studied under a mathematician who may have been from Sicily.

The rolls were written in Latin until 1733, except for a short time around 1650. During the reign of Henry II, a duplicate copy of the year's pipe roll was made for the Chancellor, and was called the Chancellor's roll. This was created at the same time as the regular pipe roll, and was written by a clerk of the Chancellor. The Chancellor rolls survive from 1163 to 1832, but are basically duplicates of the corresponding pipe rolls, except for the occasional addition of a private charter or other material.

== Influence on other records ==
The example of the royal Exchequer's records eventually influenced others to keep similar records. The earliest surviving non-royal pipe rolls are those of the Bishop of Winchester, which are extant from 1208, and form a continuous series from that date. They started under Peter des Roches, who was also a royal clerk and administrator. They record monies coming in as well as expenses and payments made, in detail, but like the royal records, they do not show profits or losses as a sum total. Most private rolls resembling the pipe rolls are from monasteries. The household rolls, which closely resemble the pipe rolls, for Eleanor of England, wife of Simon de Montfort, survive for part of the year 1265.

== Studies by historians ==
A number of historians have studied the surviving pipe rolls, using them as the basis for the study of financial and governmental history, especially of the medieval era. A study from 1925 compiled the royal income that passed through the Exchequer for each year of Henry II and Richard I, as well as a sample of some years from John's reign, attempting to compare how the royal revenues compared in the various reigns. Recent work by Nick Barratt on the reigns of Richard and John have updated the earlier research. Historian David Carpenter has carried out further studies on the early years of King Henry III's reign. The pipe rolls have also been used to identify royal officials, especially those that were involved in local government and were not high-ranking. Because they recorded judicial fines, the pipe rolls also can be used to shed light on how the judicial system in medieval England worked, as well as identifying royal judges. Although they don't provide exact revenue figures, most historians believe they represent a close approximation of revenue, and can be used to gain a general understanding of how much financial resources the English kings had available in the Middle Ages.

The lone surviving pipe roll from the reign of Henry I, that of 1130, has been a popular subject of study. Recent investigations include Judith Green's search for evidence of Henry's financial system. Another historian, Stephanie Mooers Christelow, has studied the roll along with those from the reign of Henry II, looking for the exemptions and grants made by both kings to various royal favourites. Christelow has also studied the 1130 roll to see what light it can shine on Henry I's judicial system, as well as on the growth of royal courts during Henry's reign. The historian C. Warren Hollister used the 1130 pipe roll to study the rewards of royal service during Henry's reign.

The pipe rolls from the 13th century onwards are less important for historical study because there are other surviving financial records. Some, such as the receipt rolls, were also kept by the Exchequer, and were used by the treasury clerks to prepare the pipe rolls. Other surviving records were kept by the sheriffs for their own use in submitting accounts to the pipe rolls. However, the post 13th-century pipe rolls are occasionally the sole source for historical facts such as William Shakespeare's residence in the parish of St Helen's Bishopsgate and in Southwark.

== Publication ==
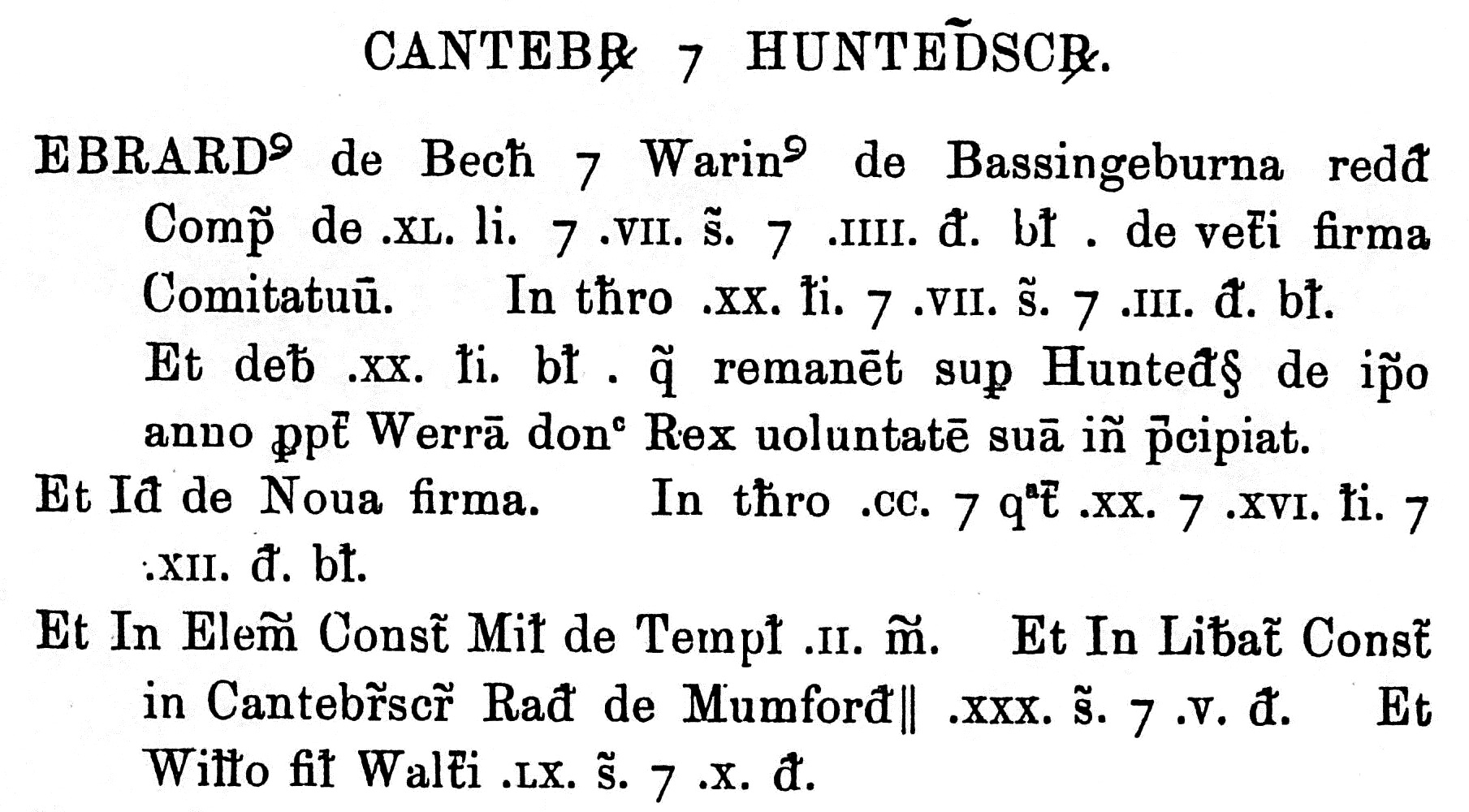
Extract from the pipe roll for 21 Henry II (1174–5), as published by the Pipe Roll Society in 1897 using record type

The earliest pipe rolls were published by the Record Commission in 1833 (the isolated roll of 1130) and the Public Record Office in 1844 (the rolls for 1155–58). The Commission's edition of the 1130 roll has now been superseded by a new edition (with English translation) published by the Pipe Roll Society in 2012.

In 1883 the Pipe Roll Society (a text publication society) was founded by the Public Record Office, on the initiative of Walford Dakin Selby and his colleague James Greenstreet, to establish a systematic publishing programme for the pipe rolls. It published its first volume in 1884, and has now published all the rolls from 1158 to 1224. Besides the continuous series, it has also published the roll for 1230. The rolls for 1241 were published in 1918 by Yale University Press. Various county record societies have published parts of the rolls for various years that relate to their particular county. The Society's earliest volumes (to 1900) were printed in "record type", designed to produce a near-facsimile of the original manuscript, including its scribal abbreviations. This policy was abandoned in 1903, and all volumes since have been published in normal type with abbreviations extended.

The Pipe Roll Society has also published numerous related texts, including the Chancellor's Roll for 1196 and the Norman pipe rolls of Henry II. Rolls for the Irish Exchequer and the Norman Exchequer have also been published.
