= Richard FitzNeal =

12th-century Bishop of London and Treasurer of England

- Bishop of London
- Appointed: 15 November 1189
- Term ended: 10 September 1198
- Predecessor: Gilbert Foliot
- Successor: William of Sainte-Mère-Eglise
- Other post: Dean of Lincoln

Orders
- Consecration: 31 December 1189

Personal details
- Born: c. 1130
- Died: 10 September 1198 (aged ~68)
- Denomination: Catholic

4th Lord Treasurer
- In office 1156–1196
- Monarchs: Henry II; Richard I
- Preceded by: Nigel, Bishop of Ely
- Succeeded by: William of Ely

Richard FitzNeal (Note: Or FitzNeale, FitzNigel, sometimes called Richard of Ely) (c. 1130 – 10 September 1198) was a churchman and bureaucrat in the service of Henry II of England. He served as Lord High Treasurer of the Exchequer from 1156 to 1196 and wrote the Dialogus de Scaccario (Dialogue concerning the Exchequer), the first administrative treatise of the Middle Ages. He also served as the Bishop of London from 1189 until his death in 1198.

== Life ==
In 1158 or 1159 Nigel, Bishop of Ely, paid Henry II to appoint his natural son, Richard FitzNeal, as the king's treasurer. Richard was the great nephew of Roger, Bishop of Salisbury, who had organized the exchequer under Henry I, when it was separated from the Chamberlain's office in the king's household. Henry II, who was an astute judge of character and inspired great loyalty, was well served by Richard, who held the post of Lord Treasurer at the head of Henry's exchequer for almost the next 40 years. Concurrently, Richard was Dean of Lincoln, a major administrative position in an important English diocese. In 1184 he was made Prebendary of Aylesbury. He also held the prebend of Chiswick in the diocese of London.

In 1177 Henry II asked FitzNeal to write a book about his work. The book, Dialogue Concerning the Exchequer (Dialogus de Scaccari), is the first administrative treatise of the Middle Ages, a unique source of information on royal finances and the methods of collecting them in the twelfth century. Its preface instructs the novice in governance that it is not the function of the exchequer officials to decide on the merit of royal policy, merely to execute it. The secular bureaucracy is the instrument of the king's will, and the royal power ebbs and flows according to whether his treasury is full or empty. He wrote at the end of the work that he had "laid my axe to the virgin and rough wood and cut for the royal buildings' timber that a more skilled builder may smooth with his adze". It is in the Dialogue that Richard recorded an oral story told him by Henry of Blois, grandson of William the Conqueror and Bishop of Winchester, about the origins of Domesday Book, which according to Henry of Blois's story was made so that "every man might be content with his own rights, and not encroach unpunished on those of others".

As well as being treasurer, FitzNeal was rewarded with the position of bishop of London from 1189 until his death in 1198. He was nominated on 15 September 1189 and consecrated on 31 December 1189. The Diocese of London ranks third in honour in the Church of England, after the Archdioceses of Canterbury and York.

Evidence from FitzNeal's writings shows that Richard had read the Institutes but that he seems to have not read the Digest, although he may have known of it.

FitzNeal was replaced as treasurer in 1196 by William of Ely. He died on 10 September 1198.

== Citations ==
Political offices
Preceded by Nigel, Bishop of Ely	Lord Treasurer; 1159–1196	Succeeded by William of Ely
Catholic Church titles
Preceded by Gilbert Foliot	Bishop of London; 1189–1198	Succeeded by William of Sainte-Mère-Eglise
