= William Brito =

12th-century English clergyman

William Brito (or William the Breton) was a medieval clergyman in England during the 12th century.

Brito was a royal chaplain and was appointed Archdeacon of Ely by 1110. He was a nephew of Hervey le Breton, the Bishop of Ely. He is last mentioned as archdeacon in 1144 or 1145, but was probably suspended from office on 22 December 1150 and was removed from his archdeaconry by 1152. He was the father of a son named Henry, who became a member of the clergy.

Brito was given a manor at Pampisford, Cambridgeshire by his uncle, a gift that was confirmed by King Henry I of England in 1127. Also confirmed was the grant of Little Thetford to Brito. Pampisford was part of the bishopric's estates, and Brito held the manor in return for the service of one knight. But in 1135, the new bishop, Nigel recovered a number of the bishopric's properties that had been alienated, including Pampisford. Another manor may have been involved, as Henry, Brito's son, had a long running dispute with the cathedral chapter of Ely Cathedral from 1149 to 1153 over a manor which both sides claimed.

The historian, Edward Miller, of the see of Ely called Brito "warlike".
