= Peter Schöffer =

Early German printer (c. 1425 – c. 1503)

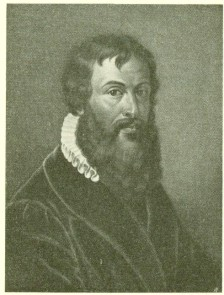
Peter Schöffer

Peter Schöffer or Petrus Schoeffer (c. 1425 – c. 1503) was an early German printer, who studied in Paris and worked as a manuscript copyist in 1451 before apprenticing with Johannes Gutenberg and joining Johann Fust, a goldsmith, lawyer, and money lender.

Among his best-known works are the 1457 Mainz Psalter, the 1462 Bible or Biblia pulcra, and the 1484 Herbarius latinus.

== Life and works ==
Schöffer was born in Gernsheim. Working for Fust, Schöffer was the principal workman of Johannes Gutenberg, inventor of modern typography, whose 42-Line Bible was completed in 1455. In 1455 he testified for Johann Fust against Gutenberg. By 1457, he and Fust had formed the firm Fust and Schöffer, after the foreclosure of the mortgage on Gutenberg's printing workshop.

Famous works include the Psalter of 1457, the 1462 Bible (the fourth printed Bible, also known as the Biblia pulcra [beautiful Bible]) Cicero's De officiis (1465), Justinian's Institutes (1468), and Herbarius – Rogatu plurimorum... (1484), usually referred to as the "Herbarius latinus". The Herbarius was compiled from older sources and was popular enough to go through ten reprints before 1499. It illustrates and describes 150 plants and 96 medicines commonly found in apothecaries. There is reason to believe that Schöffer himself commissioned the compilation, although the name of the compiler is not recorded. Schöffer is considered the author of many innovations such as dating books, including a title page and colored inks in print. After going into business on his own, Schöffer confined his publishing to works on theology, and civil and ecclesiastical law. He died in Mainz.

Around 1470/71 Schöffer acquired the Humbrechthof in Mainz, which was later called Schöfferhof. Schöffer married Fust's only daughter, Christina, and his sons also entered the printer's trade. His son John carried on as printer between 1503 and 1531, was competent, but did not rank with the top printers of that time. Another son, Peter the younger, was an able die-cutter and printer, and conducted business in Mainz (1509–23), Worms (1512–29), Strasbourg (1530–39) and Venice (1541–42). In 1526, Peter Schöffer the younger published the first English New Testament in Worms, translated by William Tyndale. Peter the younger's son Ivo, continued the printing business at Mainz (1531–55).

== Legacy ==
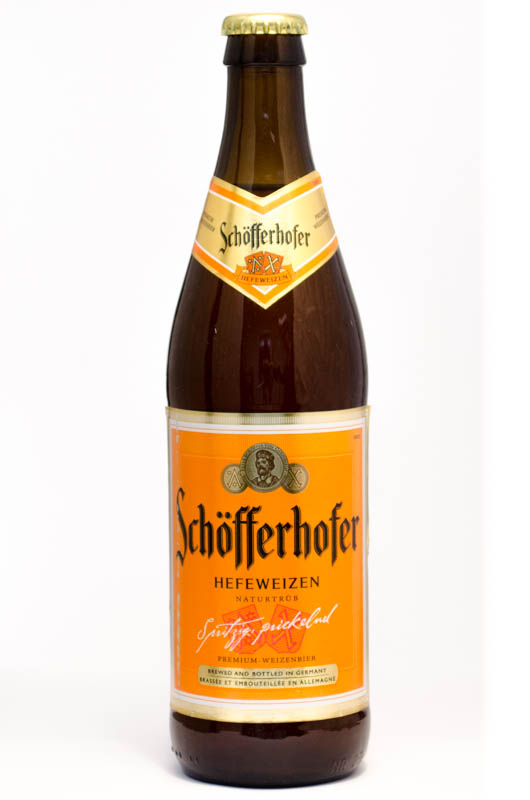
Schöfferhofer Hefeweizen

Schöfferhofer is a brand of German wheat beer named for the former house of Peter Schöffer (the house was called the Mainzer Schöfferhof) in which a brewery was founded. This brand of beer sports a portrait of Peter Schöffer as its trademark. The Schöfferhofer brand originates from this brewery in Mainz, which is also known as the Brauerei Dreikönigshof.

According to the New York Times, in her 2014 novel Gutenberg's Apprentice, Alix Christie addresses the issues of "intellectual property theft" relating to Schöffer and Gutenberg in the invention of printing.

== See also ==
- Mammotrectus super Bibliam
