= Constitutio domus regis =

Household handbook of Henry I of England

- Establishment of the King's Household
- Language: medieval Latin
- Date: circa 1136
- Provenance: Durham Cathedral
- Genre: Administrative document
- Subject: Handbook listing offices of the household of King Henry I of England
- Period covered: 1100–1135

The Constitutio domus regis (or Establishment of the King's Household), was a handbook written around 1136 that discussed the running of the household of King Henry I of England, as it was in the last years of Henry's reign. It was probably written for the new king, Stephen. It gives what every officer and member of the household should be paid, what other allowances they should be given, as well as listing all offices in the household. It is likely that the author of the work was Nigel who was treasurer under Henry I and became Bishop of Ely in 1133, although this is not accepted by all historians.

The Constitutio lists the offices and officers in three main grades. The first consists of the chancellor, the stewards, master butler and chamberlain, and the constables. The Treasury, or Exchequer, was already separate from the household of the king by the time the document was composed; for, although the head of the treasury, the Treasurer, was listed in the document, the rest of the treasury officials are not covered. It covers the whole of the domus regis, or household of the king.

It isn't until the Household Ordinances of 12 November 1279 that another document regulating the king's household survives.

== Sources ==
- Chrimes, S. B. (1966). An Introduction to the Administrative History of Mediaeval England (Third ed.). Oxford, UK: Basil Blackwell.
- Coredon, Christopher (2007). A Dictionary of Medieval Terms & Phrases (Reprint ed.). Woodbridge, UK: D. S. Brewer. ISBN 978-1-84384-138-8.
- Kealey, Edward J. (1972). Roger of Salisbury, Viceroy of England. Berkeley, CA: University of California Press. ISBN 0-520-01985-7.
- Lyon, Bryce Dale (1980). A Constitutional and Legal History of Medieval England (Second ed.). New York: Norton. ISBN 0-393-95132-4.
- Mason, Emma (2002). "Administration and Government". In Harper-Bill, Christopher; Van Houts, Elizabeth (eds.). A Companion to the Anglo-Norman World. Woodbridge, UK: Boydell. pp. 135–164. ISBN 978-1-84383-341-3.
