= Johann Fust =

Inventor/Investor of the first press (died 1466)

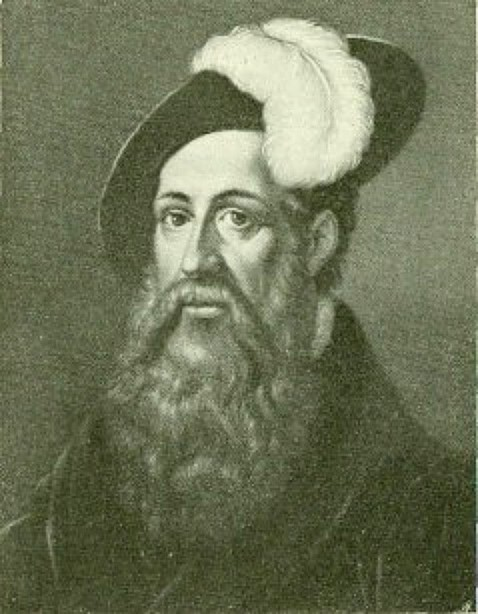
- Portrait of Johann Fust
- Born: c. 1400; Mainz, Holy Roman Empire
- Died: 1466 (aged 65–66); Paris, Kingdom of France
- Occupations: Merchant, banker, printer
- Known for: Financing Gutenberg's printing press

Johann Fust or Faust (c. 1400 – October 30, 1466) was an early German printer.

== Family background ==
Fust was born to a burgher family of Mainz, traceable back to the early thirteenth century. Members of the family held many civil and religious offices.

The name was written "Fust" until 1506, when Peter Schöffer, in dedicating the German translation of Livy to Maximilian I, Holy Roman Emperor, called his father-in-law "Faust." Thenceforward, the family assumed this name. The Fausts of Aschaffenburg, an old and quite distinct family, placed Johann Fust in their pedigree. Johann's brother Jacob, a goldsmith, was one of the burgomasters in 1462, when Mainz was stormed and sacked by the troops of Count Adolf II of Nassau, in the course of which he seems to have been killed (suggested by a document dated May 8, 1678).

== Printing ==
Fust, along with his brother, was a member of the goldsmiths' guild of Strasbourg. Like many medieval goldsmiths, he also functioned as a financier. Because of his connection with Johannes Gutenberg (died 1468), Fust has been called the inventor of printing, and the instructor as well as the partner of Gutenberg. Some see him as a patron and benefactor who saw the value of Gutenberg's discovery and supplied him with the means to implement it, whereas others portray him as a speculator who took advantage of Gutenberg's necessity and robbed him of the profits of his invention.

Whatever the truth, the Helmasperger document of November 6, 1455, shows that Fust advanced money to Gutenberg (apparently 800 guilders in 1450, and another 800 in 1452) to carry on his work, and that Fust, in 1455, brought a suit against Gutenberg to recover the money he had lent, claiming 2026 guilders for principal and interest. It appears that he had not paid in the 300 guilders a year which he had undertaken to furnish for expenses, wages, etc., and, according to Gutenberg, had said that he had no intention of claiming interest.

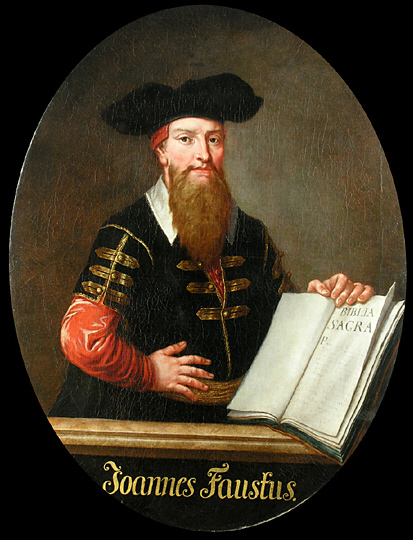
Often taken to be a portrait of Doctor Faustus, this is an idealised portrait of Johann Fust with his printed Bible.

The suit was apparently decided in Fust's favour,

November 6, 1455, in the refectory of the Barefooted Friars of Mainz, when Fust swore that he himself had borrowed 1550 guilders and given them to Gutenberg. There is no evidence that Fust, as is usually supposed, removed the portion of the printing materials covered by his mortgage to his own house, and carried on printing there with the aid of Peter Schöffer of Gernsheim (known to have been a scriptor at Paris in 1449), who in about 1455 married Fust's only daughter Christina. The first publication by Fust and Schöffer, the Psalter of August 14, 1457 (a folio of 350 pages, the first printed book with a complete date) was remarkable for the beauty of the large initials printed each in two colours, red and blue, from types made in two pieces. New editions of the Psalter with the same type appeared in 1459 (August 29), 1490, 1502 (Schöffer's last publication) and 1516.

Fust and Schöffer's other works include:

- Guillaume Durand, Rationale divinorum officiorum (1459), folio, 160 leaves
- the Clementine Constitutions, with the gloss of Johannes Andreae (1460), 51 leaves
- Biblia Sacra Latina (1462), folio 2 vols., 242 and 239 leaves, 48 lines to a full page
- the Sixth Book of Decretals, with Andreae's gloss, December 17, 1465, folio 141 leaves
- Cicero. De officiis, 88 leaves.

== Fust and Schöffer ==
Johann Fust and Peter Schöffer carried on a partnership after Fust sued and won a case against Johann Gutenberg in 1455 for the right to take back his loans that he offered Gutenberg years earlier. Many rumors came to light about why Fust turned his back on Gutenberg merely a year before the 42-Line Bible was to be completed (even though Gutenberg had not only agreed to pay back the original loans but also was allowing Fust to add interest onto them).

Peter Schöffer was an associate of Fust that worked as an apprentice to Gutenberg during the making of the 42-Line Bible. Schöffer took Fust's side when the court case was presented to Gutenberg, and subsequently had his name join Fust's on the completed copies of the Bible. The twist is that Schöffer ended up marrying Fust's only daughter, Christina, years later.

== As a businessman ==
Johann Fust was not much of a printer but more of a businessman and a salesman. Fust loaned 800 guilders (with an interest of 6%) to Johannes Gutenberg with which to start his original project. Later, another large sum of money was handed over from Fust to Gutenberg. At this point, Fust felt as if he needed to be included as a partner on the project since he had now invested so much into it.

There were all but three Bibles left to be completed when Fust decided to foreclose on his loans. On November 6, 1455, Fust demanded 2,026 guilders from Gutenberg. He also revealed in court that he had to borrow the money he gave to finance Gutenberg at 6% in order to even give the loan. All in all, Gutenberg ended up having to pay 1,200 guilders to Fust along with all of the completed Bibles, unfinished books, and his workshop.

From that point on Gutenberg was hardly ever heard from again and Fust went into partnership with Peter Schöffer. Schöffer had learned all the fine skills of printing from Gutenberg. This meant that Schöffer would be able to use the same techniques he had learned and practiced, while the savvy businessman Fust could find ways to do what he was best at, which was to sell the books that they were making. They made copies of the famed "42-line Bible" in both paper and vellum. The paper ones were sold for 40 guilders each, while the ones on vellum were sold for 75 guilders apiece. Fust set up a sales branch in Paris as well, expanding the sales of this Bible on a global level (long before any type of global businesses were even thought about in society). Paris is also believed to be the place where Fust died in 1466.

== Witchcraft accusations ==
It was once believed that Johann Fust was working for the devil. After several of Gutenberg’s bibles were sold to King Louis XI of France, it was decided that Fust was performing witchcraft. This idea came about for a few reasons, including the fact that some of the type was printed in red ink, mistaken for blood. It was also discovered that all of the letters in these bibles, presented to the King and his courtiers as hand-copied manuscripts, were oddly identical. Fust had sold 50 bibles in Paris and the people there could not fathom the making and selling of so many bibles so quickly, because printing had not come to the forefront yet in France. Parisians figured that the devil had something to do with the making of these copies, and Fust was thrown into jail on charges of black magic. He was eventually released, since it was proved he was running a business in which printing enabled the rapid production of multiple copies of the same text. Elizabeth Eisenstein cites a similar story, and comments:

The story may be just as unfounded as the legend that linked the figure of Johann Fust with that of Dr Faustus. The adverse reaction it depicts should not be taken as typical; many early references were at worst ambivalent. The ones that are most frequently cited associate printing with divine rather than diabolic powers.

It does seem plausible to historians of print that Fust may have alarmed certain vested interests in the Paris book trade, and may have had bibles confiscated in Paris in 1465. In general, the church and the Sorbonne welcomed the new technology. Until early sources are verified for this story about witchcraft accusations, it may be that Schafer and Goldschmidt were extrapolating under the influence of the Johann Fust / Johann Georg Faust confusion.

== Death ==
In 1464, Adolf II of Nassau appointed for the parish of St Quintin three Baumeisters (master-builders) who were to choose twelve chief parishioners as assistants for life. One of the first of these "Vervaren", who were named on May 1, 1464, was Johannes Fust, and in 1467 Adam von Hochheim was chosen instead of the late (selig) Johannes Fust. Fust is said to have gone to Paris in 1466 and to have died of the plague, which raged there in August and September. He certainly was in Paris on July 4, when he gave Louis de Lavernade of the province of Forez, then chancellor of the duke of Bourbon and first president of the parliament of Toulouse, a copy of his second edition of Cicero, as appears from a note in Lavernade's own hand at the end of the book, which is now in the library of Geneva.

Nothing further is known about Fust save that, on October 30 (c. 1471), Peter Schöffer, Johann Fust (son), and Schöffer's presumed partner Conrad Henlif (variantly, Henekes or Henckis) instituted an annual mass in the abbey-church of St. Victor of Paris, where Fust was buried. Peter Schöffer, who married Fust's daughter (c. 1468), also founded a similar memorial service for Fust in 1473 in the church of the Dominican Order at Mainz (Karl Georg Bockenheimer, Geschichte der Stadt Mainz, iv. 15).

According to some sources, the speed and precise duplication abilities of the printing press caused French officials to claim that Fust was a magician, leading some historians to connect Fust with the legendary character of Faust. Friedrich Maximilian Klinger's Faust, a printer, may borrow more from Fust than other versions of the Faust legend.

== Successors and influence ==
After Peter Schöffer married Fust's daughter, Christina, the printing business of Fust and Schöffer carried on through offspring. Fust and Schöffer had done much to keep their printing methods secret, even going as far as to make their employees swear by oath that they would not reveal anything. However, the secrets were revealed anyway. Schöffer's sons (Fust's grandsons) Johann and Peter continued on in their father's and grandfather's footsteps. The younger Peter's son Ivo also made printing his career. Johann Fust may not have started out as a printing man but he certainly ended up influencing a whole new generation of printing. What started out in Germany spread to other parts of the world. It seemed unlikely that the original partnership between Fust and Gutenberg would end up having the effect that it ultimately did on the printing press. Many people will credit and continue to credit Gutenberg for much of the success of the 42-line Bible and for printing in general. The facts do state, however, that if it was not for Johann Fust that this Bible would have never been created in the first place. Fust controlled the sales aspect as well and branched out this creation to people in other countries. Thanks to Fust's partnership with Schöffer a whole new generation of printers were brought into the world. The argument remains who is the true father of the printing press. Johann Fust is the name that most people still do not know today. Johann Fust will always be the man who turned his back on Gutenberg; however, he will also always be the man that truly began the printing press (through cunning and greed but there will also be people who call it business strategy).

== See also ==
- Laurens Janszoon Coster
