= Dialogus de Scaccario =

Treatise on the English Exchequer

The Dialogus de Scaccario, or Dialogue concerning the Exchequer, is a mediaeval treatise on the practice of the English Exchequer written in the late 12th century by Richard FitzNeal. The treatise, written in Latin, and known from four manuscripts from the 13th century is set up as a series of questions and answers, covering the jurisdiction, constitution and practice of the Exchequer. One academic said that "The value of this essay for early English history cannot be over-estimated; in every direction it throws light upon the existing state of affairs." It has been repeatedly republished and translated, most recently in 2007.

Divided into two books and written as a series of questions and answers between a learned lawyer and his pupil, the treatise first looks at the constitution of the Exchequer, analysing the Upper and Lower Exchequers individually and giving descriptions of their officers and jurisdiction. The second book describes the Exchequer "in practice", giving a layout of the proper way to plead cases and the timetable by which a case ran.

== Origin ==
The treatise was most likely written by Richard FitzNeal, Lord High Treasurer of the Exchequer under Henry II.

The date of authorship of the book is disputed. It describes six circuits of itinerant justices; academics argue, therefore, that it must have been written before 1179, when the number of circuits was reduced to four. This assumes, however, that the changes to the circuits came into immediate effect, and Richardson argues that there is nothing in the Pipe Rolls to support this assumption. Other academics suggest either 1181 or 1188 as possible dates of composition.

== Versions and translations ==
As well as its initial publication and additional versions during the 18th and 19th centuries, the book was again published in 1902 by the Clarendon Press; this soon went out of print, and a second edition with a commentary was published in 1950, edited by Charles Johnson. This again went out of print, necessitating a new edition published by Oxford University Press in 1983. The 1952 edition was favourably reviewed, with K.R. Potter writing that it was "a most helpful guide to those unfamiliar with medieval finance". Ernest Henderson wrote that it was:

"one of the few actual treatises of the middle ages. It is a most learned essay concerning all that went on at the bi-yearly meetings of the exchequer officials, and branches out into a description of all the sources of revenue of the English crown, and of the methods of collecting them. The value of this essay for early English history cannot be over-estimated; in every direction it throws light upon the existing state of affairs."

The most recent edition was published in 2007, again by Oxford University Press. This was edited and translated by Emilie Amt and S. D. Church — and has been described as being a "valuable new edition and translation which merits considerable use". It has also, however, been criticised for doing little "to advance the study of this difficult and important text".

== See also ==
- Tractatus of Glanvill, the earliest surviving treatise on the common law, from the same period.

== Bibliography ==
- Johnson, Charles (1983). Dialogus de Scaccario (2nd ed.). Oxford University Press. ISBN 0-19-822268-8.
- Potter, R.K. (1952). "Review: Dialogus de Scaccario by Charles Johnson". The Classical Review. 2 (3/4). Cambridge University Press. doi:10.1017/s0009840x00159839. ISSN 0009-840X. S2CID 161471000.
- Richardson, H.G. (April 1928). "Richard fitz Neal and the Dialogus de Scaccario". The English Historical Review. 43 (170). Oxford University Press. ISSN 0013-8266.
