= Hobson (surname) =

Hobson is an English patronymic surname. Originating in Scandinavian Denmark, the surname found its way to England and Iceland during the Anglo-Saxon (450-1066) and Viking (793-1066) eras, evolving from Son of Hrod (Hróður) to Hobson. The name reaches its highest concentrations in Yorkshire, Lincolnshire and Cambridgeshire.

== A ==
- Albert Hobson (1925–2017), English footballer
- Alexis Hobson (1880–1960), American college football player
- Alf Hobson (1913–2004), English footballer
- Alice Mary Hobson (1860–1954), English landscape painter
- Allan Hobson (1933–2021), American psychologist and professor of psychiatry
- Andrew Hobson (born 1998), South African field hockey player
- Andy Hobson (born 1978), British rugby league footballer
- Anthony Hobson (English cricketer) (born 1965), English cricketer
- Anthony Hobson (book historian) (1921–2014), British auctioneer and historian
- Anthony Hobson (South African cricketer) (born 1963), South African cricketer
- Asher Hobson (1889–1992), American agricultural economist

== B ==
- Babe Hobson, (1904-1966) American baseball player
- Bailey Hobson (born 2002), English footballer
- Barry Hobson (1925–2017), Northern Irish cricketer and educator
- Benjamin Hobson (1816–1873), British Protestant medical missionary
- Bert Hobson (1890–1963), English footballer
- Brandon Hobson, Cherokee Nation fiction writer
- Brooke Hobson (born 1999), Canadian ice hockey player
- Bulmer Hobson (1883–1969), Northern Irish writer and Irish nationalist
- Butch Hobson (born 1951), American baseball manager and former player

== C ==
- Cal Hobson, American politician
- Charles Hobson, Baron Hobson (1904–1966), British politician
- Charles Hobson (trade unionist) (1845–1923), British trade unionist
- Charlotte Hobson (born 1970), English writer

== D ==
- Daf Hobson (born 1951), English cinematographer
- Darington Hobson (born 1987), American basketball player
- Dave Hobson (1936–2024), American politician and lawyer
- David Hobson (tenor) (born 1969), Australian opera singer
- Deb Hobson, American politician
- Denys Hobson (born 1951), South African cricketer
- Denys Hobson (cricketer, born 1983), South African cricketer
- Derek Hobson (born 1949), English TV and radio broadcaster and journalist.
- Dorothy Hobson (born 1946), Jamaican and West Indies cricketer

== E ==
- E. W. Hobson (1856–1933), English mathematician
- Edward H. Hobson (1825–1901), American merchant, banker, politician, tax collector, railroad executive and Civil War brigadier general
- Edward Hobson (botanist) (1782–1830), English weaver and botanist
- Edward Hobson (cricketer) (1869–1923), English cricketer
- Elizabeth Christophers Hobson (1831–1912), American social worker
- Elton Hobson (1924–2020), Canadian football player

== F ==
- Florence Fulton Hobson (1881–1978), Irish architect
- Frank Hobson (1894–1951), British flying ace
- Francis Hobson (1889–1931), English footballer
- Fred Hobson (1880–1957), English professional footballer
- Frederick Hobson (1873–1917), Canadian soldier posthumously awarded the Victoria Cross
- Frederick Taylor Hobson (1840–1909), British Army major-general

== G ==
- Gary Hobson (born 1972), English footballer
- George Andrew Hobson (1854–1917), British civil engineer and bridge builder
- George Hobson (footballer) (1903–1993), English footballer
- George Hobson (wrestler), New Zealand wrestler
- George H. Hobson (1908–2001), American athlete and sports coach
- Gordon Hobson (born 1957), English footballer
- Graham Hobson, American college football coach

== H ==
- Harold Hobson (1904–1992), English drama critic and author
- Haskins Hobson (1877–1954), American attorney and politician
- Henry Hobson (1891–1983), American Episcopal bishop
- Henry Hobson (director), English film director
- Howard Hobson (1903–1991), American college basketball and baseball coach and basketball player

== I ==
- Ian Hobson, English pianist and conductor
- Issy Hobson (born 2007), English footballer
- Ivo Hobson (born 1990), English cricketer

== J ==
- Jason Hobson (born 1983), English rugby union player
- Jeremy Hobson, American radio journalist and podcaster
- Jesse E. Hobson (1911–1970), American electrical engineer
- J. A. Hobson (1858–1940), English economist and liberal
- John M. Hobson (b. 1962), author of The Eastern Origins of Western Civilisation
- John Hobson (politician) (1912–1967), British Conservative Member of Parliament and Attorney-General
- Joshua Hobson (1810–1876), British Chartist and Tory Radical
- Julius Hobson (1922–1977), American politician

== K ==
- Kenneth B. Hobson (1908–1979), general in the United States Air Force
- Kenny Hobson (1957–2006), Grenadian cricketer

== L ==
- Laura Z. Hobson (1900–1986), American novelist
- Leigh Hobson (born 1970), Canadian road cyclist
- Lloyd Hobson (born 1985), South African cricketer
- Louis Hobson, American musical theater actor
- Luke Hobson (born 2003), American swimmer

== M ==
- M. K. Hobson (born 1969), American speculative fiction/fantasy writer
- Mackie Hobson (born 1966), South African cricketer
- Marian Hobson (born 1941), British scholar
- Mark Hobson (boxer) (born 1976), British professional boxer
- Mark Hobson (spree killer) (born 1969), English murderer
- Mary Hobson (1926–2020), British writer, poet and translator
- Mary Hobson (curler) (fl.1987–1988), American curler
- Maud Hobson (1860–1913), Australian-born English actress
- Mellody Hobson (born 1969), American businesswoman, chairwoman of Starbucks and DreamWorks Animation
- Michael Z. Hobson (1936–2020), American publisher and executive vice president of Marvel Comics
- Mike Hobson (fl. 1995–present), British television producer

== N ==
- Naomi Hobson (born 1979), Aboriginal Australian artist
- Nick Hobson (born 1994), Australian cricketer
- Noel Hobson (born 1934), New Zealand field hockey player
- Norman Hobson (born 1933), English footballer

== P ==
- Paul Hobson (died 1666), English nonconformist officer in the parliamentary army during the English Civil War
- Patrick Hobson (1933–2024), British Anglican clergyman
- Pearl Hobson (1879—1919, American-born Russian actress and cabaret artist
- Peggie Muriel Hobson (d. 1988), Scottish geographer
- Percy Hobson (RAF officer) (born 1893), British World War I flying ace
- Percy Hobson (high jumper) (1942–2022), Australian athlete
- Peter Hobson, English psychology professor
- Peter Hobson (cricketer) (born 1949), South African cricketer

== R ==
- Richard Hobson (physician), English physician
- Richard Hobson (priest), Irish Anglican priest
- Richard R. G. Hobson, American attorney and lawyer
- Richmond P. Hobson (1870–1937) U.S. Navy admiral, Medal of Honor recipient, and congressman from Alabama
- Richmond P. Hobson Jr. (1907–1966), American-Canadian writer
- Robert Lockhart Hobson (1872–1941), British civil servant and antiquarian
- Ronald Hobson (1921–2017), British entrepreneur and philanthropist

== S ==
- Samuel George Hobson (1870–1940), Anglo-Irish writer and socialist
- Sarah Hobson (born 1947), British author of travel books
- Sarah M. Hobson (1861–1950), American physician
- Scott Hobson (field hockey) (born 1967), field hockey player from New Zealand
- Scott Hobson (rugby union) (born 1988), English rugby union player
- Shaun Hobson (born 1998), English footballer
- Sid Hobson (born 1917), Australian rugby league footballer
- Simon Wain-Hobson (born 1953), British-French microbiologist
- Susan Hobson (born 1958), Australian athlete

== T ==
- T. Frank Hobson (1900–1966), Justice of the Florida Supreme Court
- Thayer Hobson (1897–1967), American business executive
- Theo Hobson (born 1972), British theologian
- Thomas Hobson (carrier) (c. 1544–1631), English postal carrier
- Thomas Hobson (actor) (born 1982), American actor
- Thomas Hobson (cricketer) (born 1994), South African cricketer
- Tommy Hobson (1881–1937), South African rugby union player
- Tony Hobson (basketball) (born 1959), American college women's basketball coach
- Tui Hobson (20th–21st century), New Zealand woodcarver and sculptor

== V ==
- Valerie Hobson (1917–1998), British actress, wife of John Profumo
- Victor Hobson (born 1980), American football player

== W ==
- Waller Hobson (1851–1924), Irish Anglican clergyman
- Walter Hobson, English footballer
- Wilder Hobson (1906–1964), American writer and editor
- Will Hobson, American journalist
- William Hobson (1792–1842), first Governor-General of New Zealand
- William Hobson (born 1991), birth name of professional wrestler Powerhouse Hobbs

== Fictional characters ==
- Christopher Hobson, a character in Star Trek: The Next Generation
- Gary Hobson, leading character of the television series Early Edition
- Henry Hobson, title character of the 1915 play Hobson's Choice and various film adaptations
- Dr. Laura Hobson, a recurring character in the UK television series Inspector Lewis and Inspector Morse

== See also ==
- General Hobson (disambiguation)
- Senator Hobson (disambiguation)
- Hopson
