= Vicars of the Parish Church of St. Mary the Virgin, Aylesbury =

The Vicars of the Parish Church of St. Mary the Virgin, Aylesbury can be traced back to Adam in 1271. The title of Vicar is very old and arises from the medieval situation where priests were appointed either by a secular lord, by a bishop or by a religious foundation.

== List of Vicars ==
List of Vicars of the Parish Church of St. Mary the Virgin, Aylesbury

Incumbent	Notes
Adam	Died 1271.
Robert	Presented 1271, by the Procurator of Percival de Lavinia, Prebendary of Aylesbury, in Lincoln Cathedral.
Adam de Rodebroke	Presented in 1312, by Richard de Havering, Prebendary of Aylesbury.
William de Uffington	Succeeded in May, 1315.
Ralph de Lutterworth	1315. Exchanged for Ashby Magna, Leicester with William de Gruttleworth.
William de Gruttleworth	1324.
John de Winchcombe	Presented in July, 1325.
Robert de Stanley	Resigned 1348.
William de Ludenton	Presented 1348 by Edmund Beresford, Prebendary of Aylesbury.
Robert Randolph	Succeeded November, 1361
William Theed	Succeeded Robert Randolph, and in 1412 exchanged for Wennington, Essex with John Rede.
John Rede	1414. He exchanged for Morden, in Surrey, with John Swell.
John Swell	1415.
William Bode	Succeeded John Swell. Exchanged for the Vicarage of Croxton, Norfolk, with Thomas Rogers.
Thomas Rogers	1421. He was presented by Robert Fitzhugh, Prebendary of Aylesbury.
John Ufflete	Presented in 1448 by John Beverley, Prebendary of Aylesbury.
John Young	Succeeded on John Ufflete's death, and was presented in 1463, by John Marshall, Prebendary of Aylesbury.
John Golafre	Presented in 1472, by John Marshall, Prebendary of Aylesbury.
John Breforten	Succeeded John Golafre. Died in 1482.
Richard Frere	Presented 1482 by Ralph Scroope, Prebendary of Aylesbury. He died 1500.
Richard Harom	Presented 1500 by Ralph Scroope, Prebendary of Aylesbury. He resigned.
John Aslabe	Presented 1506 by Ralph Scroope, Prebendary of Aylesbury.
Nicholas Mylys	Succeeded in 1511, of the resignation of John Aslabe. He himself also resigned.
John Losche or Lusshe	Succeeded Nicholas Mylys in 1529, on the presentation of Brian Higden, Prebendary of Aylesbury. He was a fellow of Eton College, and was succeeded on his death.
John Penwyn	Succeeded in 1545.
Robert Downing	1555. He died, and was buried at Aylesbury 1564.
Francis Purefoy	1565. He was also Rector of Hulcott, which living with the Aylesbury vicarage he resigned about 1570.
John Chandler	Prebendary of Aylesbury. He resigned 1572.
John Hitchcock	Succeeded John Chandler, 1572. He was presented by the lessee tenant under the Prebendary.
John Price	Presented 1597, by Sir Henry Lee, the Prebendary's lessee tenant. He resigned.
Robert Bell	Presented 1598. Buried in Aylesbury in 1618.
James Colly	Succeeded Robert Bell. Died the same year, and was buried 18 July 1618.
John Barton	1618. He was a fellow of New College, Oxford. The Commissioners and Visitors appointed to purify the church in The Protectorate of Oliver Cromwell listed the Rev John Barton of Aylesbury a 'scandalous minister' and it was voted that he would be expelled. On 8 July 1642 information in writing was given to the House of Commons that John Barton had spoken against the Parliament. As a result, he was sent for and delivered to Parliament in custody of the Sergeant-at-Arms. John Barton did not deny the words and was committed to the 'Gatehouse' on 18 July, but discharged on 26 July of the same month. Subsequently, he was driven from the Vicarage. By 1645 he had been taken into Mr. Grenville's house at Wotton Underwood, in the capacity of Chaplain, and in 1651 was made perpetual curate of Wotton Underwood. At the same time John Luff was in possession of the Vicarage, and was recorded to have intruded. He was ejected under the Act of Uniformity 1662, and the old Incumbent, John Barton, had possession once again.
John Dalton	Succeeded on the death of John Barton, being instituted in 1655.
Isaac Loddington	Instituted 1688, and died Vicar.
John Dudley	Collated by the Bishop of Lincoln in 1729 by lapse, being the Prebendary of Aylesbury in Lincoln Cathedral.
Decimus Reynolds	In 1735 he had a special dispensation to hold the Rectory of Chalfont St. Giles with the Aylesbury Vicarage. He was of Sidney Sussex College, Cambridge, A.B. and A.M. He died in 1755.
John Stevens	Succeeded Decimus Reynolds. He was master of Aylesbury Grammar School in 1744. Died approximately 1761 and was buried at Aylesbury.
Thomas Lloyd	He was of Magdalen College, Oxford. In 1795 he vacated this living on being presented by Christ's Hospital, London, where he was educated to the Rectory of Albrighton, Shropshire, which he held until his death in 1817. He was succeeded at Aylesbury by his brother, William Lloyd.
William Lloyd	He was of Jesus College, Oxford. He was perpetual curate of Nether Winchendon, and died in 1816.
John Morley	Inducted, April 1816, on the presentation of the Prebendary of Aylesbury. He had been curate of Hampton Lucy and Charlescott; in 1792, Vicar of Wasperton, Warwick, and in 1819 Rector of Bradfield Combust, on the presentation of Thomas Howard, and likewise curate of St. Clements, in Ipswich. He died in 1842.
John Radclyffe Pretyman	He succeeded in 1842. He was the son of the late Rev. John Pretyman, Rector of Sherrington and Prebendary of Aylesbury. He was of Trinity College, Oxford, at which he was a Blount Exhibitioner, B.A. 1838, M.A. 1843, and was ordained deacon in 1838, when he became curate of Trowbridge, Wiltshire. In 1841, he held sole charge of the curacy of Winwick, Northamptonshire and in the following year he was appointed to Aylesbury, and he resigned from this in 1853.
Edward Bickersteth	Second son of Rev. John Bickersteth, M.A., and nephew of the first Lord Langdale. He was born in 1814 at Acton, Suffolk. He entered Trinity College 1832, and graduated B.A., at Sidney Sussex College, 1836, when he was 24th Senior Optime. He had previously obtained the Taylor's Mathematical Exhibition. Later he entered Durham University as a student of Theology. He was ordained deacon at the end of 1837, and priest in January, 1839. In 1838 and 1839, he served as curate to Archdeacon Vickers, at Chetton, Shropshire. In 1839 he was appointed to the curacy of the Abbey, Shrewsbury. In 1848 he was promoted by Earl Howe to the Incumbency of Penn Street. He was appointed Rural Dean of Amersham, by the Bishop of Oxford, the same year, Vicar of Aylesbury and Archdeacon of Buckingham, in 1853. He left Aylesbury on promotion to the Deanery of Lichfield.
Arthur Percival Purey-Cust	Cust graduated from Brasenose College, Oxford, B.A. in 1850, M.A. 1854. He was ordained deacon 1851 and priest 1852. He was the Rector of Cheddington from 1853 to 1861, when he became Incumbent of St. Mary's, Reading. He was appointed Rural Dean in 1858; was fellow of All Souls' College, Oxford; Archdeacon of Buckingham, June 1875, and installed Vicar of Aylesbury in the same year. He was then appointed to the Deanery of York in 1880.
Arthur Thomas Lloyd	Graduated from St. Edmund Hall, B.A. 1868, M.A. 1870, deacon 1868, and priest 1869, curate of Cholsey, Berkshire, five years before he was removed by the Bishop of Oxford to the sole charge of Watlington, Oxfordshire, which he held from 1873 to 1876. He resigned on his presentation by the Bishop for the Vicarage of Aylesbury. In 1882 he accepted the living of St. Nicholas, Newcastle-on-Tyne.
Charles Coleridge Mackarness	The eldest son of the Lord Bishop of Oxford. Educated at Winchester College. Graduated Exeter College, Oxford B.A.1873, and M.A. 1876, ordained deacon 1874, and priest 1875. From 1874 to 1879 he was assistant curate at St. Mary's, Reading. In 1876 he was appointed Examining Chaplain to the Bishop of Argyll and the Isles. from 1879 to 1881 he was chaplain, censor, and lecturer in Exegesis of Greek Testament at King's College, London, and from 1880 to 1882 was lecturer in Liturgical and Pastoral Theology at the same college. In 1875, he was appointed Chaplain to the Bishop of Oxford, and as Vicar of Aylesbury in 1882.
