= Richard Hobson =

Richard Hobson may refer to:

- Richard Hobson (physician), English physician
- Richard Hobson (priest), Irish Anglican priest
- Richard R. G. Hobson, member of the Virginia House of Delegates
