= James Kennedy (priest) =

Irish Anglican priest

James Kennedy was an Irish Anglican priest in the mid 19th century.

Kennedy was born in Ireland and educated at Trinity College, Dublin. He was Archdeacon of Waterford from 1831 until his resignation in 1845, after which he was the Rector of the church at Abington.

Church of Ireland titles
Preceded by Richard Hobson	Archdeacon of Waterford; 1831–1845	Succeeded by Robert Bell
