= Winchcombe (disambiguation) =

Winchcombe is a town in Gloucestershire, England.

Winchcombe may also refer to:

- John Winchcombe (disambiguation)
- Frederick Winchcombe (1855–1917), Australian businessman and politician
- Winchcombe baronets, County of Berkshire, England

== See also ==
- Winchcombeshire, ancient English county
