= Uffington =

Uffington is the name of several places:

== England ==
- Uffington, Lincolnshire

- Uffington and Barnack railway station
- Uffington Rural District

- Uffington, Oxfordshire

- Uffington railway station (Uffington Junction)

- Uffington, Shropshire

== United States ==
- Uffington, West Virginia

== See also ==
- Uffington Castle, Oxfordshire
- Uffington House, Chester
- Uffington White Horse, Oxfordshire
- William de Uffington (before 1288 – after 1315), English priest
- Huffington
