= Adam de Rodebroke =

Roman Catholic priest

Adam de Rodebroke was a priest in the Roman Catholic Church who was presented to the post of Vicar of St. Mary the Virgin, Aylesbury in December 1312 by Richard de Havering, Prebendary of Aylesbury. He eventually resigned from the post.
