= Hooson =

Hooson is a surname. Notable people with the surname include:

- Emlyn Hooson, Baron Hooson QC (1925–2012), British politician
- Isaac Daniel Hooson (1880–1948), Welsh solicitor and poet
- Tom Hooson (1933–1985), British politician

== See also ==
- Hobson (surname)
