= Ralph de Lutterworth =

Ralph de Lutterworth was a Priest in the Roman Catholic Church.

== Career ==
Was presented the post of Vicar at St. Mary the Virgin, Padbury on 3 Dec 1298. He was then presented the post of Vicar at St. Mary the Virgin, Aylesbury in 1315 possibly by Richard de Havering, Prebendary of Aylesbury. He exchanged the post with William de Gruttleworth in 1324 for the Parish of Ashby Magna, Leicester.
