= Hobson =

Hobson may refer to:

== People and fictional characters ==
- Hobson (surname)
- Hobson R. Reynolds (1898–1991), African-American politician and judge
- Thomas Hobson (1545 – 1631), English carrier of the eponymous Hobson's Choice

== Places ==
=== New Zealand ===
- Hobson County, New Zealand, a former local authority
- Mount Hobson (Auckland), a volcanic cone in the Auckland Volcanic Field
- Mount Hobson (Great Barrier Island), the largest mountain on Great Barrier Island

=== United States ===
- Hobson, Jefferson County, Alabama
- Hobson, Randolph County, Alabama, an unincorporated community
- Hobson, Washington County, Alabama, a census-designated place and unincorporated community
- Hobson, Missouri, an unincorporated community
- Hobson, Montana, a city
- Hobson, Nevada, a ghost town
- Hobson, Texas, an unincorporated community
- Hobson, Virginia, a city

=== Elsewhere ===
- Hobson Lake, British Columbia, Canada
- Hobson, County Durham, a village in England

== Other uses ==
- Hobson (New Zealand electorate), a former New Zealand Parliamentary electorate
- Hobson Street, Auckland, New Zealand, a major street
- USS Hobson (DD-464), a destroyer which served in World War II

== See also ==
- Hobson Block, a building in West Union, Iowa, United States, on the National Register of Historic Places
- Hobson site, a Native American archaeological site in Ohio
- Hobson Plan, an organizational structure established by the United States Air Force in 1948
- Hobson v. Hansen, an American federal court case
- Hobson-Jobson, alternative title of a book and a phrase in English
- Hobson's choice, a free choice in which only one option is offered
- Hobson City, Alabama, a town
- Hobsonville, New Zealand and Oregon
- Hopson (disambiguation)
