= Scott Hobson =

Scott Hobson may refer to:

- Scott Hobson (field hockey) (born 1967), former field hockey player from New Zealand
- Scott Hobson (rugby union) (born 1988), English rugby union player
