= General Hobson =

General Hobson may refer to:

- Edward H. Hobson (1825–1901), U.S. Army brigadier general
- Frederick Taylor Hobson (1840–1909), British Army major general
- Kenneth B. Hobson (1908–1979), U.S. Air Force general
