= Heffington =

Heffington is a surname. Notable people with the surname include:

- Don Heffington (1950–2021), American drummer, percussionist, and songwriter
- Ryan Heffington (born 1973), American dancer and choreographer

Benjamin Heffington (born 2001) USMCR Combat Engineer.

== See also ==
- Huffington
