= Hopson =

Hopson is a surname. Notable people with the name Hopson include:

- Briggs Hopson (born 1965), Republican member of the Mississippi Senate
- Dennis Hopson (born 1965), American basketball player and coach
- Eben Hopson (1922–1980), Alaskan Native American politician
- Eddie Hopson (born 1971), American professional boxer
- Hal Hopson (born 1933), American composer and church musician
- Howard C. Hopson (1882–1949), American businessman convicted of fraud
- James Hopson (born 1935), American paleontologist and professor
- Jim Hopson, president and chief executive officer for the Saskatchewan Roughriders of the Canadian Football League
- Marcus Hopson (born 1985), American rapper known professionally as Hopsin
- Peregrine Hopson (1685–1759), British army officer who saw extensive service during the 18th century and rose to the rank of Major General
- Tyrone Hopson (born 1976), American football offensive guard who played in the National Football League
- Violet Hopson (1891–1973), American-born British actress
- William Hopson (c. 1887–1928), American pilot

== See also ==
- Hopson, Kentucky
- Hopson Development, established in Guangzhou, China in 1992, one of the five largest real estate private companies in Guangdong Province
- Hopson House, located in Alexandria, Louisiana
- Hopson-Swan Estate, national historic district and estate located at Sparkill in Rockland County, New York
- Hobson (disambiguation)
