= Nathanael Lynch =

Irish Anglican priest

Nathanael Lynch was an Irish Anglican priest in the first half of the 17th century.

Lynch was educated at Trinity College, Dublin. He was a Prebendary of Kilmanagh in Kilkenny Cathedral and Archdeacon of Waterford from 1629 until his resignation in 1634.
