= Arthur Lloyd (bishop) =

British Anglican bishop

The Right Reverend Arthur Lloyd
- Bishop of Newcastle
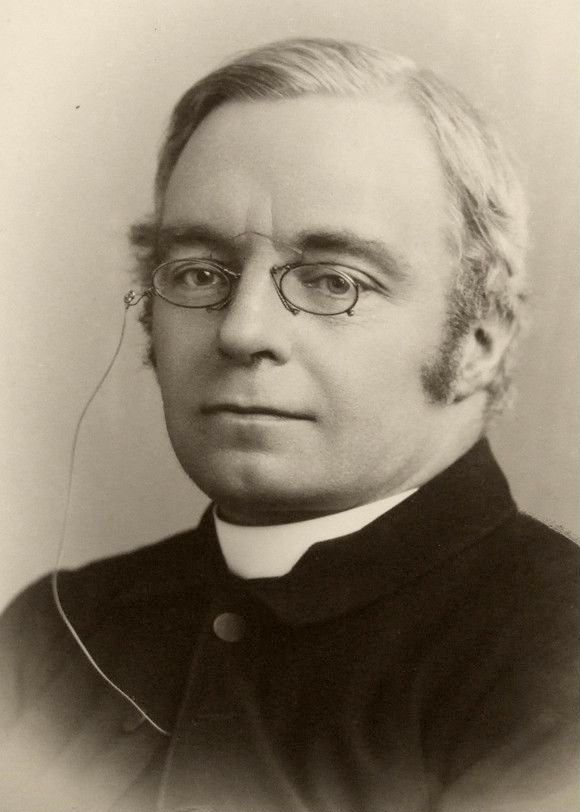
- Photograph of Lloyd as Bishop of Newcastle
- Church: Church of England
- Diocese: Diocese of Newcastle
- In office: 1903–1907
- Predecessor: Edgar Jacob
- Successor: Norman Straton
- Other posts: Vicar of Newcastle Cathedral (1882–1894); Bishop of Thetford (1894–1903)

Orders
- Ordination: 1869 (priest) by Samuel Wilberforce
- Consecration: 1894 by Edward White Benson

Personal details
- Born: 13 December 1844
- Died: 29 May 1907 (aged 62) South Kensington, County of London, United Kingdom
- Buried: Benwell, Northumberland
- Denomination: Anglican
- Residence: Benwell Towers (bishop's palace; at death)
- Parents: Henry & Georgiana Etough
- Spouse: none
- Education: St Edmund Hall, Oxford

Arthur Thomas Lloyd (13 December 1844 – 29 May 1907) was an Anglican bishop. He served as Bishop of Thetford (suffragan bishop to the Bishop of Norwich, 1894–1903) and as Bishop of Newcastle (1903–1907).

== Family and education ==
The son of Henry W. Lloyd, vicar of Cholsey, and Georgiana Etough, and a brother to F. C. Lloyd (who became vicar of Cholsey, 1890–1895, and later vicar of Kew, Surrey), Arthur was educated at Magdalen School and St Edmund Hall, Oxford.

== Priest ==
Ordained a deacon in 1868, then a priest by Samuel Wilberforce, Bishop of Oxford, on 21 February 1869 at St Luke's Maidenhead, his first post was as his father's curate at Cholsey (1868–1873), his second was curate-in-charge of Watlington, Oxfordshire (1873–1876), from where he moved to become vicar of Aylesbury (1876–1882). After some time as the first vicar of Newcastle upon Tyne after the parish church became Newcastle Cathedral (he was also an honorary canon and rural dean), he was appointed to be vicar of North Creake and Archdeacon of Lynn, becoming also the first modern Bishop of Thetford (suffragan to the Bishop of Norwich) in 1894.

== Bishop ==
He was ordained and consecrated a bishop by Edward White Benson, Archbishop of Canterbury, at Westminster Abbey, on St Luke's Day (18 October) 1894. In 1903 he was translated to become the third Bishop of Newcastle; he was nominated in February, elected on 11 May and installed in Newcastle Cathedral on 4 June. He died in post four years later.

== Death and legacy ==
A bachelor who had "always lived" with his sisters, Lloyd died on 29 May 1907 at his sister's house in South Kensington, London. He was buried "as a commoner" on 3 June at St James's parish church, Benwell, where he had lived at Benwell Towers, the bishop's palace; there is, however, an alabaster memorial to him at Newcastle Cathedral. The cathedral memorial was unveiled at a large service on 29 July 1919. On 11 March 2012, Martin Wharton, Bishop of Newcastle, rededicated Lloyd's grave at Benwell, following its restoration after serious neglect.
