= Norman Straton =

Norman Dumenil John Straton
- Bishop of Sodor and Man
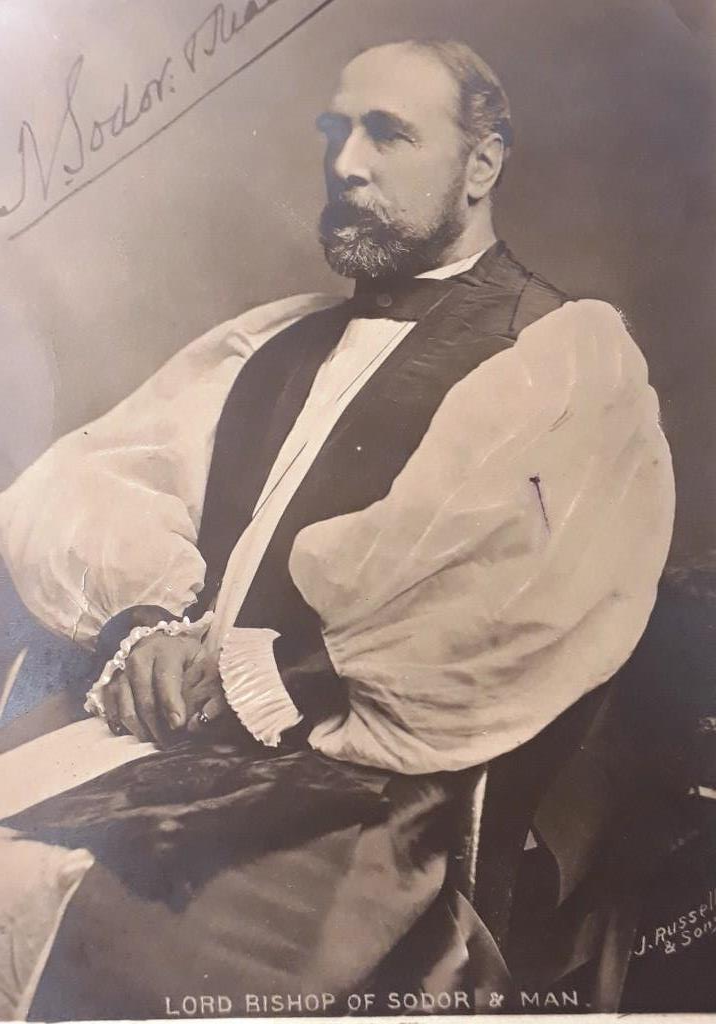
- In office: 1892–1897
- Predecessor: John Wareing Bardsley
- Successor: Thomas Drury

Personal details
- Born: 4 November 1840
- Died: 5 April 1918 (aged 77)
- Education: King William's College; Christ's College, Cambridge

Styles of Norman Straton
- Reference style: The Right Reverend
- Spoken style: My Lord
- Religious style: Bishop

Norman Dumenil John Straton (4 November 1840 – 5 April 1918) was an Anglican bishop.

Straton was born at Somersal Herbert, Derbyshire, the only son of the Revd George William Straton (1825–1891), rector of Somersal Herbert and his wife, Elinor Katherine (née Norman). His great-grandfather on his father's side was Robert Jocelyn, 1st Earl of Roden and his great-grandfather on his mother's side was Charles Manners, 4th Duke of Rutland.

He was educated at Trinity College, Cambridge, graduating BA in 1863, and ordained in 1865. His first post was as a curate at Market Drayton from where he became vicar of Kirkby Wharfe then from 1875 vicar and rural dean of Wakefield. From 1888 to 1892 he was Archdeacon of Huddersfield. In 1892 he became the Bishop of Sodor and Man and 15 years later was translated to Newcastle where he was nominated on 8 July, installed on 2 September 1907. In an age when bishops lived as lords, it is noteworthy that the 1901 Census records Straton resident in the Isle of Man with 6 servants and the 1911 Census in Benwell Tower, Newcastle upon Tyne, with 9 servants. In 1914, Straton was absent from his post through ill-health for some time and, on his return to duty, showed that he was a strong supporter of British involvement in the Great War, certain that 'the righteous LORD, WHO loveth righteousness will prove Himself to have been on our side'. He took responsibility for providing a Church Hut for 5000 troops based in Alnwick, and for encouraging recruitment to the forces from clergy and their families. He announced his retirement in July 1915 and died in 1918.

Church of England titles
Preceded by John Wareing Bardsley	Bishop of Sodor and Man; 1892–1907	Succeeded by Thomas Drury
Preceded by Arthur Lloyd	Bishop of Newcastle; 1907–1915	Succeeded by Herbert Wild
