= John de Havering =

English military and civil servant

Arms of John de Havering: Argent, a lion rampant tail fourchee gules, collared azure

John de Havering (died 1309), Lord of Grafton was an English military and civil servant. He was considered one of the most experienced administrators of King Edward I, serving as Seneschal of Gascony and as Justiciar of North Wales.

== Life ==
John de Havering was a son of Richard de Havering, who was steward of the estates of Simon de Montfort, 6th Earl of Leicester. His father died in 1267, whereupon de Havering inherited his possessions. During the reign of King Henry III he was Lord of Grafton in Northamptonshire.

From October 1274 to October 1278, de Havering served as Sheriff of Hampshire. After the Conquest of Wales, he became Deputy Justiciar of North Wales in 1284. In July 1287 he was one of the commanders of the army, which suppressed the rebellion of the Welsh lord Rhys ap Maredudd. After the suppression of the rebellion Havering was replaced in November 1287 as Justiciar and travelled with the king into Gascony.

Before returning to England in the summer of 1289, Edward I appointed de Havering Seneschal of Gascony. Right at the beginning of his tenure, Havering interfered in the administration of Bordeaux. The angry citizens turned to the Parlement of Paris, the tribunal of the French kings who were chief lords of Gascony. As a countermeasure, Havering seized wine that was to be exported to England. As early as 1290 Edward I started getting disturbing news from Gascony, and on actually going over there in 1294, he found numerous local barons and citizens dissatisfied with the English administration.

In 1294, Havering returned to England, where the king summoned him to a gathering of English prelates. Speaking as the King's representative, Havering threatened the clergy with outlawry if they did not grant higher taxes. During the Welsh Rebellion from 1294 to 1295 he was charged with the defence of Merionethshire. In 1295, the rebel leader Madog ap Llywelyn surrendered to him, which is why he claimed the reward of 500 marks on the capture of Madog. From 1295 to 1301 he served as Justiciar of North Wales, while he was to investigate the causes of the rebellion. However, he showed little compassion for the Welsh people, who were dissatisfied with the high levies and forced recruitment of soldiers for the king's wars. In 1299, Havering was summoned by the King to Parliament.

In 1305, Havering was again appointed seneschal of Gascony, which had been occupied during the war with France and largely by France. In 1303, Havering returned to the English administration. His son, Richard de Havering, accompanied him to France and served as commander of Bordeaux. As a seneschal, Havering had but little income and only limited jurisdiction. Therefore, he had trouble ending the feuds between the Sire d'Albret and the Sire de Caumont and between Count Gaston of Foix and Count Bernard of Armagnac. In April 1306, Edward I transferred the Duchy of Aquitaine including Gascony to the heir to the throne Edward before his own death in 1307. Havering was replaced in 1308 as Seneschal.

== Family and issue ==
Havering apparently died around 1309. His widow Margaret still owned in 1336 estates in Essex and Hertfordshire. Havering's heir was his son Richard de Havering, Archbishop of Dublin.
