= Justiciar of North Wales =

The Justiciar of North Wales was a legal office concerned with the government of the three counties in north-west Wales during the medieval period. Justiciar was a title which had been given to one of the monarch's chief ministers in both England and Scotland. Following Edward I of England's conquest of North Wales (1277–1283), the counties of Anglesey, Caernarfonshire and Merioneth were created out of the Kingdom of Gwynedd by the Statute of Rhuddlan in 1284 and placed under direct royal control. The Justiciar of North Wales was responsible for the royal administration in these counties as well as the administration of justice. English law was applied to criminal law, but in other matters Welsh law was allowed to continue.

== List of Justiciars ==
- Othon de Grandson, 1284–1294
- John de Havering, 1295–1301
- John Grey, 2nd Baron Grey de Wilton,1315
- Richard FitzAlan, 10th Earl of Arundel, 1334–1352
- Arundel sold the office to Edward the Black Prince in 1352
- John de Beauchamp, 1st Baron Beauchamp 1385–1388
- Henry Percy (Hotspur) 1399?–1403?
- William de la Pole, 1st Duke of Suffolk 1440

Deputy Justiciar to Othon de Grandson was variously his brother in law John de Bonvillars and his brother Guillaume de Grandson.
