= Robert Randolph (priest) =

Robert Randolph was a Priest in the Roman Catholic Church.

== Career ==
Was made vicar of Aylesbury by the then Prebendary of Aylesbury in 1361 on the death of William de Lundeton. He is mentioned in 1401 as vicar of Aylesbury.
