= Richard Hobson (priest) =

Richard Jones Hobson (1783–1851) was an Irish Anglican priest in the 19th century.

Hobson was born in County Waterford and educated at Winchester College, then Trinity College, Dublin from 1803 to 1806. He was Archdeacon of Waterford from 1825 until his resignation in 1831, after which he was Treasurer.

Hobson should be distinguished from his cousin Richard Jones Hobson, born 1789 in Cork, who entered Trinity College Dublin in 1805 aged 16, gaining his B.A. there in 1809. This second Richard James Hobson was a Prebend of Connor from 1830 to 1860. He died in Belfast in 1871.

Church of Ireland titles
Preceded by George Fleury	Archdeacon of Waterford; 1825–1831	Succeeded by James Kennedy
