= William de Gruttleworth =

William de Gruttleworth was a Priest in the Roman Catholic Church.

== Career ==
Was Vicar of St. Mary Ashby Magna, Leicester.

Presented the post of Vicar of St. Mary the Virgin, Aylesbury in May 1324 by Robert de Baldock, Prebendary of Aylesbury after arranging a swap with Ralph de Lutterworth. He seems to have resigned, swapped, died or retired in July 1325.
