= Henry Line =

Irish Anglican priest

Henry Line was Archdeacon of Waterford from 1913 until 1937.

Line was educated at Trinity College, Dublin and ordained in 1880. He served at Kilrossanty and Waterford (curacies); Ballinakill and Dunmore East (incumbencies). He was Chancellor of Waterford from 1896 until 1913.
