= John Winchcombe =

John Winchcombe may refer to:

- John Winchcombe (traditionally known as Jack O'Newbury; c.1489–1557), clothier and MP for Cricklade and Great Bedwyn
- John Winchcombe (died 1574) (1519-1574), MP for Reading, Ludgershall and Wootton Bassett, son of the above

== See also ==
- John de Winchcombe (14th century), English priest
