= William de Ludenton =

- Born: Unknown
- Died: 1361
- Parent: Hugonis de Ludenton

William de Ludenton was a Priest in the Roman Catholic Church.

== Career ==
Son of Hugonis de Ludenton he was made vicar of Aylesbury in 1348 by Edmund Beresford, Prebendary of Aylesbury.

== Sources ==
- Lipscomb, George. The history and antiquities of the county of Buckingham (1847).
