= Robert de Stanley =

Robert de Stanley was a Priest in the Roman Catholic Church.

== Career ==
Resigned as vicar of Aylesbury in 1348.
