= George Fleury =

Irish Anglican priest

George Fleury (1740-1825) was an Irish Anglican priest in the last decades of the 18th century and the first three of the 19th.

Fleury was educated at Trinity College, Dublin. A prebendary of Lismore, he was Archdeacon of Waterford from 1773 until his death. He was also Treasurer of Lismore from 1804.

His grandson Francis Leopold McClintock was a noted Arctic explorer.
