= William de Uffington =

William de Uffington was a Priest in the Roman Catholic Church.

== Career ==
In 1288 William de Uffington is recorded as presenting the post of Vicar of St Nicholas' Church in Pilton, Rutland to Robert de Pilton, and presenting it again in 1309.

Was presented the post of Vicar of St Mary the Virgin's Church, Aylesbury in May 1315 possibly by Richard de Havering, Prebendary of Aylesbury. He appears to have either died, swapped or resigned from this post the same year.

William de Uffington, was then presented the post of Vicar of St Nicholas, Pilton from 1414 to 1433, and was made a Justice of the Peace in 1434.
