= William Hopson =

American pilot

William C. Hopson
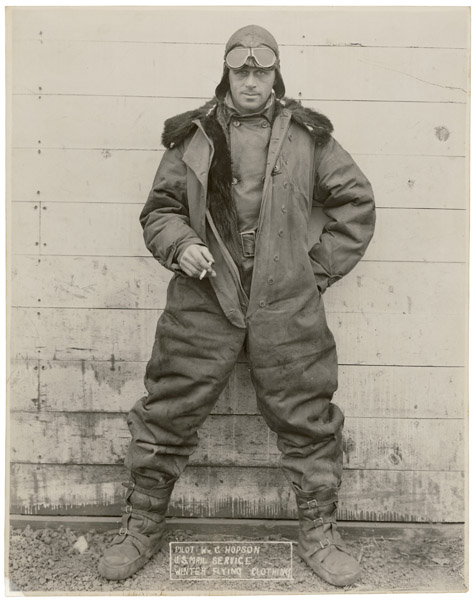
- "Wild Bill" Hopson in winter flying clothing (c. 1926)
- Born: c. 1887
- Died: October 18, 1928 (aged 41) near Polk, Pennsylvania, U.S.
- Resting place: Memorial Park Cemetery; Rock Island, Illinois, U.S.
- Other names: "Wild Bill"
- Occupation: Airmail pilot
- Known for: Flying airmail for the United States Postal Service
- Spouse: Jeanette F. (divorced)
- Children: 1

William C. "Wild Bill" Hopson (c. 1887 – October 18, 1928) was an American pilot known for flying airmail for the United States Postal Service between 1920 and 1927.

== Early life ==
William C. Hopson was born to Edward F. Hopson. Hopson attended elementary and high school in Decatur, Illinois. He graduated high school in 1905 and delivered mail for and worked in the newsroom of the Decatur Herald.

== Career ==
Hopson served in the United States Navy during World War I. Hopson worked as a taxi cab driver in New York City.

Hopson went by the nickname "Wild Bill". He flew airmail for the United States Postal Service from April 14, 1920, until September 3, 1927, when airmail service was transferred to private companies. He initially flew in New Jersey and later flew a route from Omaha, Nebraska, to Chicago. During his service, he flew over 4,000 hours and over 413,000 miles. Hopson was known for making forced landings and his popularity allowed him to get away with it. In the year 1926 alone, he reportedly made at least 13 forced landings that his managers declared as acceptable.

After private companies took over airmail service, Hopson worked for the National Air Transport company and flew a contract airmail route between New York City and Chicago.

== Personal life ==
Hopson married Jeanette F. They later divorced. He had one child, Robert.

== Crash and death ==
Hopson died instantly on October 18, 1928, at the age of 41, near Polk, Pennsylvania, in a plane crash while flying on his contract airmail route between New York City and Chicago. Hopson's plane was carrying about US$100,000 in diamonds. Only about US$65,000 of the diamonds were recovered. He was buried at Memorial Park Cemetery in Rock Island, Illinois.
