= John de Winchcombe =

John de Winchcombe was a priest in the Roman Catholic Church.

== Career ==
De Winchcombe is shown as rector of St. Lawrence Church in Ayot St Lawrence, Hertfordshire, England, although the exact date is unknown.

He was presented the post of vicar of St. Mary the Virgin, Aylesbury in December 1312 by Robert de Baldock, Prebendary of Aylesbury.

Sometime after 1333 he appears as precentor at St. Paul's Cathedral, London.
