= Bert Hobson =

English footballer (1890–c. 1963)

Personal information
- Full name: Herbert Bertie Hobson
- Date of birth: 26 February 1890
- Place of birth: Tow Law, England
- Date of death: c. November 1963 (aged 73)
- Place of death: Tow Law, England
- Height: 5 ft 8 in (1.73 m)
- Position: Full back

Senior career*
Years	Team	Apps	(Gls)
- Tow Law Town
- Stanley United
19??–1912	Crook Town		
1912–1922	Sunderland	160	(0)
1922−1925	West Stanley		
1925−1926	Darlington	5	(0)
1926−192?	Jarrow		
- Spennymoor United
- * Club domestic league appearances and goals

Herbert Bertie Hobson MM (26 February 1890 – c. November 1963) was an English professional footballer who played as a full back in the Football League for Sunderland and Darlington. He was a Sunderland player from 1912 to 1922, of which four years were lost to the First World War, and made 160 First Division appearances without scoring.

== Life and career ==
Herbert Bertie Hobson was born on 26 February 1890 in Tow Law, County Durham. He played football for Tow Law Town, Stanley United and Crook Town, and appeared for Sunderland's reserves as an amateur, before turning professional with the Football League First Division club in August 1912. He made his debut for Sunderland on 24 March 1913 in a 3–1 win against Sheffield United at Bramall Lane, played twice more that season, which Sunderland finished as champions, and soon became a regular in the side. In January 1914, he was reported to be "as sound as a rock in the Sunderland defence. His tackling and kicking improves with every game he plays." By the time competitive football was abandoned because of the First World War, he had 68 first-team appearances.

Hobson enlisted in the Durham Light Infantry, and in May 1916 was reported to have been wounded and invalided out to a London hospital. He was awarded the Military Medal. He also found time to guest for Hull City, Stoke and Wolverhampton Wanderers during the war.

He missed only two matches in the first post-war season, and was a regular in the side during the next. In September 1921, he was touted for possible selection at right back for the Football League XI to face their Irish counterparts, but was not chosen. At the end of that season, he was offered the maximum wage to sign on for another year, but refused unless he were granted another benefit. Arguing that he had received a lucrative benefit of £625 only 18 months earlier so could not expect to be guaranteed a second, the club listed him for transfer. At a fee of £1,500, there were no takers. In December 1922, Sunderland's board agreed to release Hobson to play in North-Eastern League football, while still retaining his Football League registration, and he duly signed for West Stanley.

He remained with that club until February 1925, when Sunderland finally granted him a free transfer and he returned to the Football League with Darlington. He went straight into the side in place of the injured Tommy Greaves, and played in the next two matches, after which Greaves was fit to resume. Darlington won the 1924–25 Third Division North title, and Hobson played just twice after their promotion to the Second Division, each time covering for Greaves. He left the club at the end of the season and signed for Jarrow, where he was appointed captain and stayed for at least a second season, before finishing his career with Spennymoor United.

In 1936, Hobson was an unsuccessful applicant for the post of coach to County Durham secondary schools under the auspices of a scheme promoted by the Football Association. The Sunderland Echo reported that some of the other candidates dropped out of consideration because of their interpretations of the laws of the game, a topic in which the successful candidate, former Darlington footballer Dave Edgar, had excelled.

Hobson died in his native Tow Law in late 1963 at the age of 73.

== Career statistics ==
Appearances and goals by club, season and competition
Club	Season	League			FA Cup		Total	
Club	Season	Division	Apps	Goals	Apps	Goals	Apps	Goals
Sunderland	1912–13	First Division	3	0	0	0	3	0
Sunderland	1913–14	First Division	31	0	5	0	36	0
Sunderland	1914–15	First Division	28	0	1	0	29	0
Sunderland	1919–20	First Division	40	0	4	0	44	0
Sunderland	1920–21	First Division	36	0	1	0	37	0
Sunderland	1921–22	First Division	22	0	1	0	23	0
Sunderland	Total		160	0	12	0	172	0
Darlington	1924–25	Third Division North	3	0	0	0	3	0
Darlington	1925–26	Second Division	2	0	0	0	2	0
Darlington	Total		5	0	0	0	5	0
Career total			165	0	12	0	177	0

== Sources ==
- Tweddle, Frank (2000). The Definitive Darlington F.C. Nottingham: Soccerdata. ISBN 978-1-899468-15-7.
