= Mackie Hobson =

South African cricketer (born 1966)

Personal information
- Full name: Malcolm Ralph Hobson
- Born: 5 June 1966 (age 60); Graaff Reinet, Cape Province, South Africa
- Batting: Right-handed
- Bowling: Right-arm fast-medium

Domestic team information
- Years: Team
- 2002: Hampshire Cricket Board
- 1995–1996: Northern Transvaal B
- 1993–1994: Transvaal
- 1993–1995: Transvaal B
- 1992: Border Country Districts
- 1991–1993: Border
- 1989: Eastern Province
- 1986: Natal
- 1985–1989: Natal B

Career statistics
Competition	FC	LA
Matches	44	13
Runs scored	319	35
Batting average	8.17	–
100s/50s	–/–	–/–
Top score	26	24*
Balls bowled	6,881	522
Wickets	137	14
Bowling average	27.37	33.28
5 wickets in innings	5	–
10 wickets in match	–	–
Best bowling	7/61	3/30
Catches/stumpings	12/–	2/–
- Source: Cricinfo, 28 December 2009

Malcolm 'Mackie' Ralph Hobson (born 5 June 1966 in Graaff Reinet, Cape Province) is a South African cricketer. Hobson was a right-handed batsman who bowled right-arm fast-medium.
