= Senator Hobson =

Senator Hobson may refer to:

- Cal Hobson (born 1945), Oklahoma State Senate
- Dave Hobson (1936–2024), Ohio State Senate
