= Robert Bell (priest) =

Robert Bell D.D. (1808 – 10 January 1883) was an Irish Anglican priest who was Archdeacon of Cashel from 1879 to 1883.

The son of Robert Bell, Precentor of Emly, he was born in Tipperary and educated at Trinity College, Dublin. He was the Incumbent at Tipperary; Archdeacon of Waterford from 1845 to 1879; and Archdeacon of Cashel from 1879 until his death on 10 January 1883.
