= Tui Hobson =

New Zealand wood carver and sculptor

Tui Hobson is a New Zealand sculptor based in Auckland. She has completed multiple residencies overseas including the Kaoshiung Museum in Taiwan, and Le Quesnoy in Northern France where she dedicated carved seats in the Rangimarie Gardens to the 100 year commemoration of First World War New Zealand soldiers.

== Family background ==
Hobson is of Cook Islands and New Zealand European descent with family from Rarotonga and Atiu. When young she observed her father, Ken, a teacher, sculptor and wood craftsman, and her mother, grandmother and aunt, weavers and tivaevae artists. Her father had a joinery factory in Newtown that she would visit after school. Hobson's career is inspired by her father's work and assisted by the tools, chisels and other materials her father left to her after he died.

== Career ==
Hobson's artistic career as a sculptor and artist began in the 1990s with her teaching herself carving techniques. She is one of the first female carvers of Cook Islands descent.

Her practice has been consistent across three decades, but was particularly active up until 2014 when she travelled more frequently. As of 2025 she is based in Auckland as a full-time carver and artist, and has completed a total of over 75 exhibitions, both solo and collaborative, artist talks, and public and private commissions. Hobson takes inspiration from her Cook Island heritage engaging with tivaevae patterns from her grandmother's weaving, and implementing themes of climate change, environmental awareness, migration and navigation.

Her media include various native woods like tōtara, kauri, rimu, pōhutukawa, and mātai for their grain, story and finish, and macrocarpa for outdoor works. However she also works with stone, cast glass and bronze for pieces of smaller and larger scales. The forms and shapes she works with are influenced by modernists Henry Moore and Barbara Hepworth; however, there is also a feminine influence to her forms seen in her carved female nude figure reliefs.

== Residencies ==
In 2008, Hobson did an artist residency at Kaoshiung Museum in Taiwan to contribute to Le Folauga (a showcase of contemporary Pacific art).

In 2018, she completed a six-week residency for Rangimarie Gardens in Le Quesnoy, Northern France. This project is one of her most notable international commissions involving carved seats for the Le Quesnoy gardens, specifically the Rangimarie commemorative garden. The garden is dedicated to New Zealand soldiers who fought in the First World War and her commission was on the centennial of the end of the war.

In 2025, Hobson was the fourth recipient of the Pasifika Aniva Arts Residency. The three-month paid residency was organised by Pātaka Art+Museum, Creative New Zealand, Govett-Brewster Gallery and the Len Lye Centre and contributed to Creative New Zealand's Pacific Arts Strategy for 2023–28.

Her sculptural outcome of the project was a pou dedicated to wāhine toa titled Wairaka Pou. Wairaka, an ancestral figure, is honoured in the piece as it tells the story of her travels from Ma'uke to the Cook Islands and New Zealand saving women and children stranded on a waka and embracing the opportunity to paddle it, an otherwise tapu activity. The piece was housed in Pātaka where she gave an artist talk on the work.

== Exhibitions ==
Group
| Date | Title | People | Medium | Location | Source |
|---|---|---|---|---|---|
| September 2008 | Glass Forest | Tui Hobson and Evelyn Dunstan | Wood sculpture | Remuera Gallery, Auckland | |
| 7–10 October 2016 | Tapa & Tiare | Tui Hobson and Sam Ford | Sculpture | 3 Grosvenor St, Grey Lynn | |
| 17–28 July 2024 | Eclectic | Tui Hobson and Tina Frantzen | Wood carvings | 250 Gallery, Ponsonby | |
| 13 December 2025 – 14 February 2026 | 8 [Contemporary] Cook Islands Artists | Ahsin Ahsin, Marcus Hipa, Tui Hobson, Chloe Marsters, Sylvia Marsters, David Murray, Carlos Vano, and Sefton Rani | – – – | Māngere Arts Centre (Gallery) | |

Solo
| Date | Title | Medium | Location | Source |
|---|---|---|---|---|
| 2004 | Pacific Memories | Mātai, concrete and steel pole (sculpture) | Leith Place Talking Pole Forest | |
| 28 January – 13 February 2005 | – – – | – – – | Sculpture on the Gulf 2005, Church Bay Walkway, Matiatia | |
| 2007 | Reclining Form | Sculpture | Akoranga Busway Station, Auckland | |
| 7 November 2009 – 14 February 2010 | Ancestral Light | Macrocarpa and metal poles (sculpture) | Sculpture in the Gardens Exhibition 2009–10, Auckland Botanic Gardens | |
| 9 October 2011 – 12 February 2012 | Bird Strategy | Macrocarpa (sculpture/carving) | Sculpture in the Gardens Exhibition 2011–12, Auckland Botanic Gardens | |
| 2021 | Pacific Conversation | Recycled Totara with copper finish | Art + Object Auction House, previously collection of Adrian Burr and Peter Tatham | |
| 1–20 August 2023 | Pop up exhibition | Vaka inspired swamp kauri bench seats, Pacific oars, abstract sculpture | The Poi Room, Ponsonby | |
| 7–11 September 2023 | Pop up exhibition | Vaka inspired swamp kauri bench seats, Pacific oars, abstract sculpture | Home Show, ASB Showgrounds, Greenlane | |
| February–April 2025 | Va'ine Warrior | Pacific oars and vaka-shaped benches (sculpture and carvings) | The Charlotte Museum Te Whare Takatāpui-Wahine o Aotearoa | |
| September 2025 | Vairaka, (Wairaka) | Macrocarpa, pigment, and fibre (pou) | Te Marae o te Umu Kai o Hau, Pātaka Art + Museum – the first contemporary carving created by a woman for Pātaka | |
| 2008 | Vaka to the Stars | – – – | Kaohsiung Fine Arts Museum, Taiwan | |
| – – – | Carved poles | – – – | Mangere Bridge Primary School fale | |

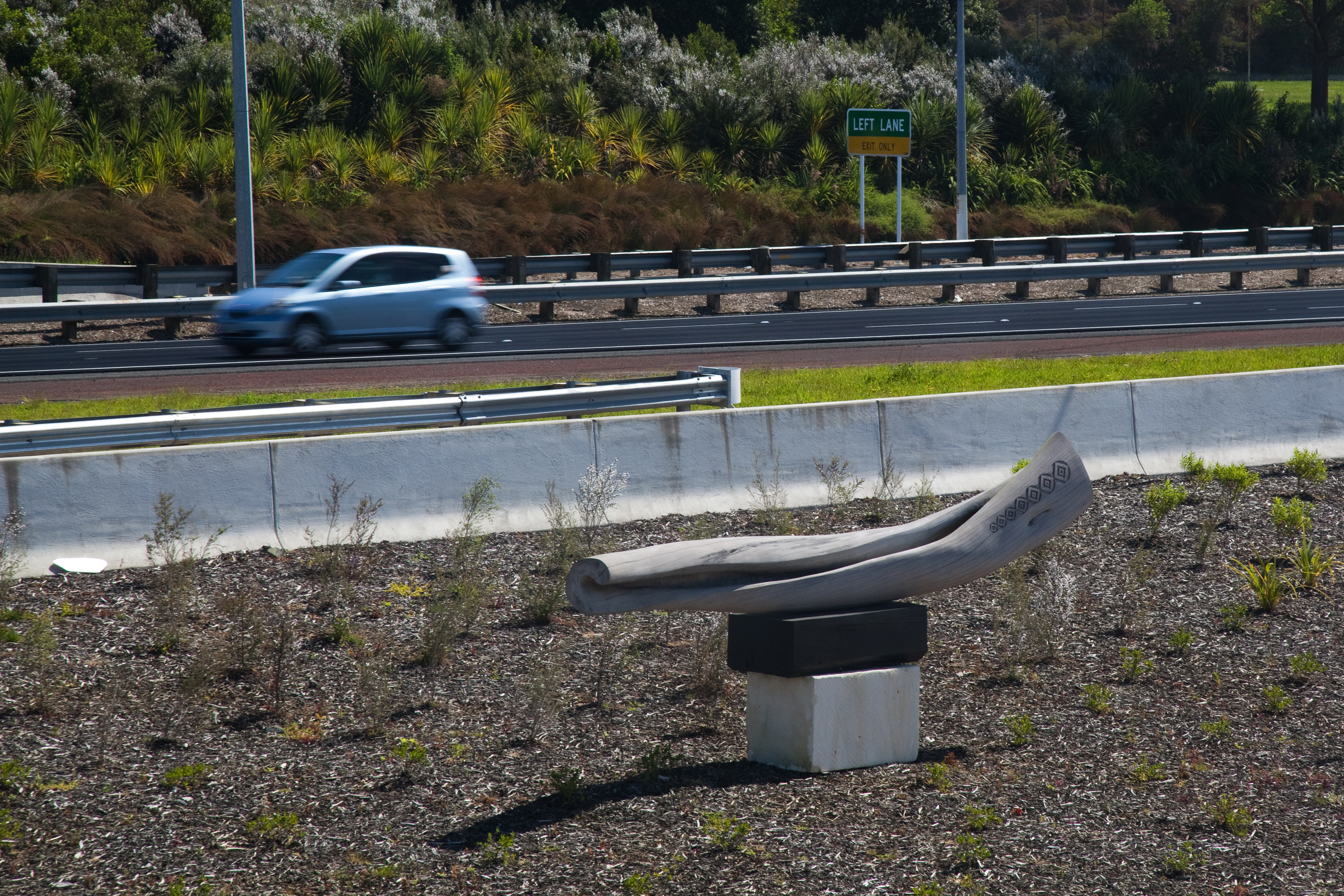
Reclining Form at Akoranga Bus Station

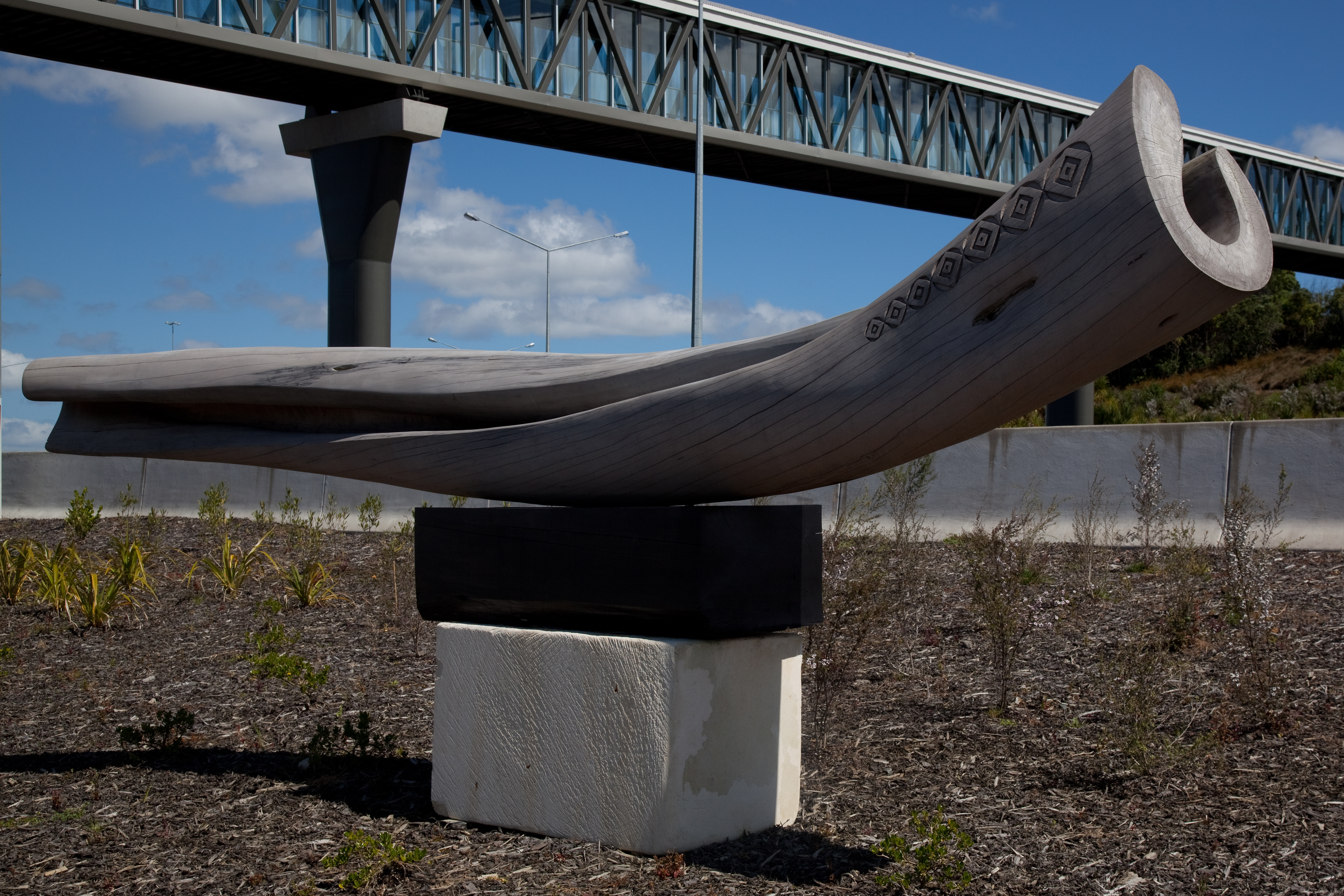

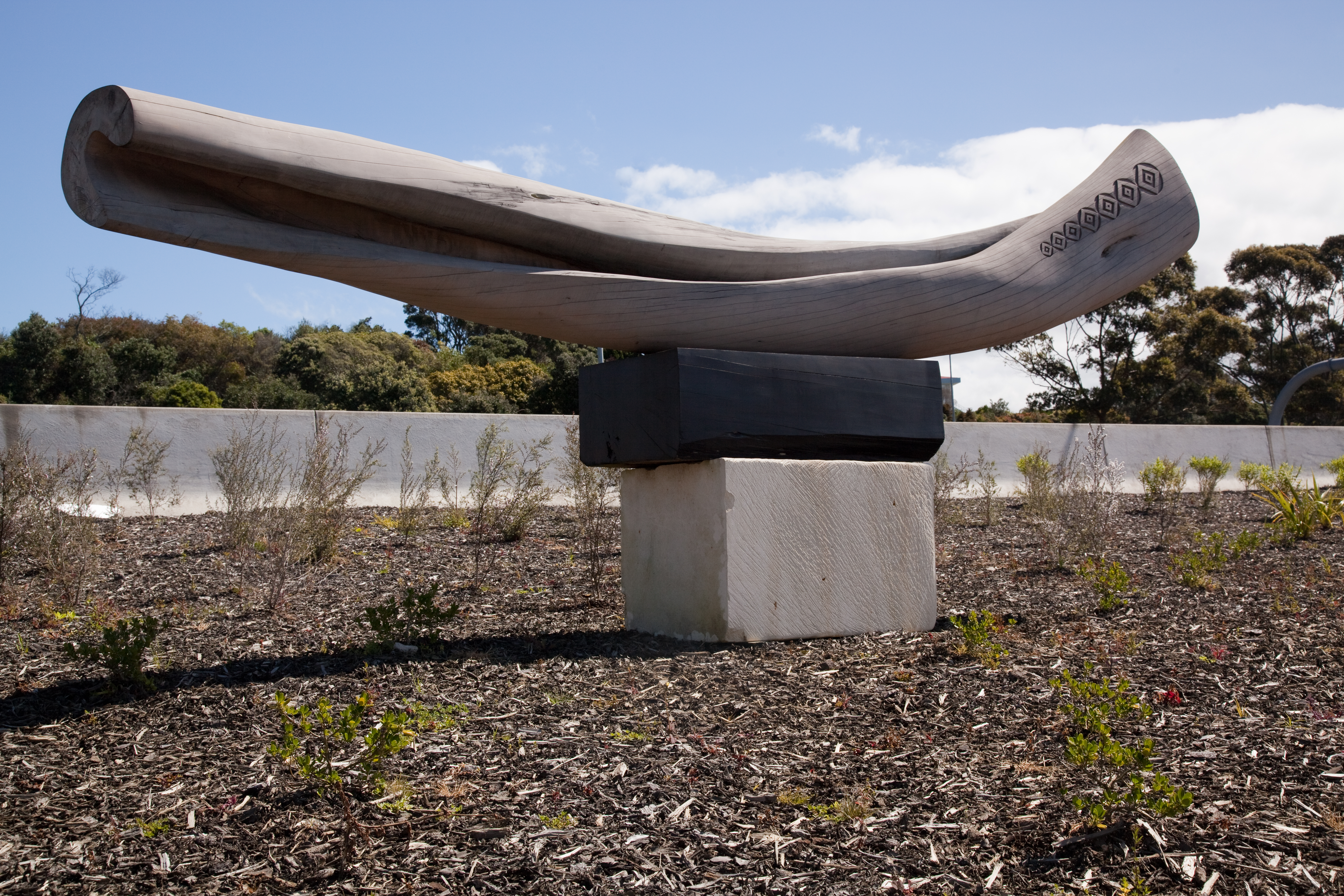

== Awards ==
- Martin Hughes Contemporary Pacific Art Award 2004 winner for Frangipani. Hobson used her winnings to reconnect with family in the Cook Islands and network with other artists whilst there.
- National Contemporary Art Award 2025 finalist.

== Projects ==
- In 2007, she carved Reclining Form at the National Wood Sculpture live event.
- In 2009, Hobson was one of 30 in the biennale National Wood Sculpture live event where she participated and carved in the 10-day challenge.
- In 2018, she crafted a pou for the Auckland rehabilitation centre gardens.
- Artist Talk with Sylvia Marsters – Tui Hobson & Sylvia Marsters: Artists in Conversation – 22 February 2025, The Charlotte Museum, Auckland.

== Recognition ==
- Her practice was detailed in a journal article by Tryphena Cracknell titled "Wahine mau whao: a woman's hand to the chisel", published in a 2019 issue of Te Aute – Journal of Maori Art, volume 1 pg. 46–59.
