= Hopson House =

Historic house in Louisiana, United States

- Formerly listed on the U.S. National Register of Historic Places
- Location within Louisiana Location within the United States
- Nearest city: Alexandria, Louisiana
- Coordinates: 31°19′1″N 92°29′47″W
- Area: 1 acre (0.40 ha)
- Built: 1885
- Architectural style: Greek Revival, Vernacular Greek Revival
- MPS: Neo-Classical Architecture of Bayou Rapides TR
- NRHP reference No.: 84000549

Significant dates
- Added to NRHP: December 05, 1984
- Removed from NRHP: November 29, 2016

Hopson House is located in Alexandria, Louisiana. It was added to the National Register of Historic Places on December 5, 1984, and removed in 2016.
