= Peggie Muriel Hobson =

Scottish geographer (d. 1988)

Peggie Muriel Hobson (died 1988) was a Scottish geographer with a special interest in the historical geography of Scotland and South Africa although she travelled widely to many other places.

== Biography ==
Hobson earned her B.Sc. with honors from University College London. She received her PhD at University of St. Andrews in 1952 with a dissertation titled: Congestion and depopulation: a study in rural contrasts between West Lewis and West Sutherland. She worked as a geography lecturer at University College London and travelled frequently to many locales including trips to the Shetland Islands, the Hebrides Islands, Alaska, the Yukon territories, Cape Breton Island in Canada, northern Norway, Angola and South Africa. She served as a lecturer in geography at the University College (London), the University of South Africa from 1953 to 1958, and University of Natal in Durban from 1955 to 1963. These were followed by her move back to London. From 1975 through 1981, she was listed among the geography lecturers at University College London.

She was a member of the Botanical Society of the British Isles and as of 1970, she was listed as an Overseas member from England of the Botanical Society of South Africa.

Two letters from Hobson in 1946 to the biologist D'Arcy Wentworth Thompson about geography are kept in the archives of the University of St. Andrews.

== Selected publications ==
- Hobson, Peggie M. (April 1949). "Assynt parish". Scottish Geographical Magazine. 65 (1): 25–43. doi:10.1080/00369224908735400.
- Hobson, Peggie M. (September 1949). "The Parish of Barra". Scottish Geographical Magazine. 65 (2): 71–81. doi:10.1080/00369224908735409.
- Hobson, Peggie M. (December 1950). "Eddrachillis Parish". Scottish Geographical Magazine. 66 (3–4): 135–147. doi:10.1080/00369225008735455.
- Hobson, Peggie Muriel (1952). Congestion and depopulation: a study in rural contrasts between West Lewis and West Sutherland (Thesis). hdl:10023/15238.
- Hobson, Peggie M. (September 1954). "Population and settlement in Nova Scotia". Scottish Geographical Magazine. 70 (2): 49–63. doi:10.1080/00369225408735562.
- Hobson, P. M. (December 1961). "Some Land Use Classification Schemes". South African Geographical Journal. 43 (1): 18. Bibcode:1961SAfGJ..43...18H. doi:10.1080/03736245.1961.10559358.
