= Mary Hobson =

British writer, poet and translator (1926–2020)

- Born: 1926; United Kingdom
- Died: 2020 (aged 93–94)
- Writing career
- Genres: Novels, translations
- Notable awards: "The Enthusiast", "Griboedov prize" in London,"Pushkin medal"

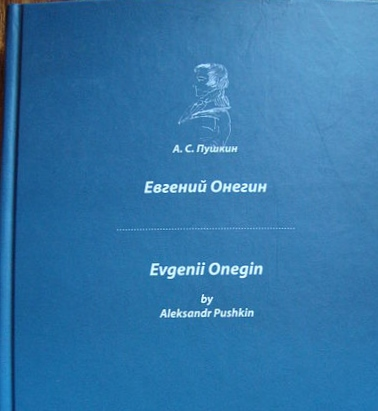
"Evgenii Onegin". Translated by Mary Hobson

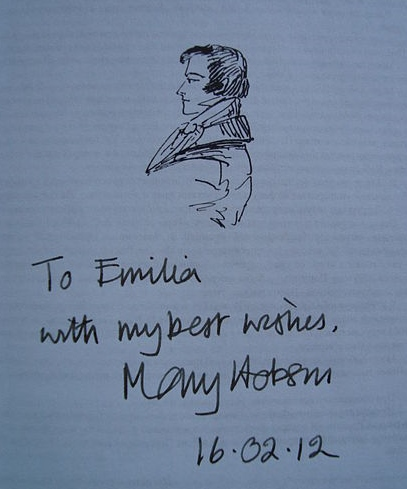
M. Hobson's signature on a page of the book "Evgenii Onegin". After the presentation at Moscow State Pedagogical University.

Mary Hobson (1926–2020) was a British writer, poet and translator. She wrote four novels and an autobiography. She translated Alexander Griboedov's Woe from Wit and his letters. Hobson also translated works by Alexander Pushkin. She won the Griboedov Prize and Pushkin Medal.

== Personal life ==
Hobson married a stage designer named Neil, and together they had four children. At 25 years of age he developed a cerebral abscess which left him debilitated on the right side of his body and speechless. Her husband became very difficult to live with and Mary Hobson left him in her 60s. Her son, Matthew, stayed with his father to prevent his mother from returning to him.

Matthew died during a motorcycle accident about 1999, which was very difficult, but she based her philosophy of managing her grief on Marcus Aurelius quote: "What we cannot bear removes us from life." Rather than living less, she chose to do more, including writing poetry about him. She was an atheist who lived in South London, wrote poetry and traveled to Moscow each year.

Hobson studied at the Royal Academy of Music in London, England.

== Career ==
While her husband underwent musical therapy, about the age of 40, Hobson wrote her first of four novels, the first three published by Heinemann Press. She studied Russian at 56 so that she could read the original version of Leo Tolstoy's War and Peace, a book that had been a gift to her by her daughter to read while recovering from a surgery and one that she felt she would not truly understand until she read the original Russian version. Her first teacher was a Russian emigree, Tatiana Borisovna Behr, who inspired an interest in Aleksander Pushkin, starting with The Bronze Horseman.

At 62, she enrolled at London University in the School of Slavonic and East European Studies. During the politically turbulent year of 1991, she studied Russian language and literature in Moscow and lived in a hostel. She graduated while still in her 60s.

Hobson translated Alexander Griboedov's Woe from Wit, which was published in 2005 and the subject of her doctoral thesis. Subsequently, she translated Griboedov's letters, some of which she said were very scandalous. She received her PhD at 74 years of age.

Her translation of Evgenii Onegin by Alexander Pushkin was published as an audiobook, narrated by Neville Jason. She translated what was deemed a "mathematically impossible" poem to translate, including the declaration of Onegin, heir to his dying uncle's estate, when asked to visit him:

The plan may be worth imitating
the boredom is excruciating.
Sit by a bedside night and day
and never move a step away.
With what low cunning one tries madly
to amuse a man who's half alive
Adjust his pillows and contrive
To bring his medicine to him sadly
Then sigh when proffering the spoon
'Let's hope the devil takes you soon'

In Russia she was considered a Pushkin expert. She presented her translation of "Evgenii Onegin" 16 February 2012 at Moscow State Pedagogical University and has presented at educational conferences in Russia and Europe.

By 2003, she began to study ancient Greek. As of March 2014, Hobson, in her late 80s, continues to take on new projects.

Hobson won the bi-centenary Griboedov prize for the best translation of Alexander Griboedov's Woe from Wit in London in 1995, the Pushkin medal, awarded by the Association of Creative Unions in Moscow and in 2010 "The Enthusiast Award" by the New Millennium Foundation. In 2011 she won the Podvizhnik Prize in Moscow.

In 2015, Hobson's fourth novel, completed in the 1980s, was published, together with an autobiography. This was followed in 2017 by a book on the last seven years of Pushkin's life told exclusively through Dr Hobson's translations of his poems and letters.

Hobson died in 2020.

== Works ==
Novels

- Mary Hobson. This Place Is a Madhouse. William Heinemann, 1980. ISBN 978-0-434-34021-7
- Mary Hobson. Oh Lily. William Heinemann Ltd, 1981. ISBN 978-0-434-34020-0
- Mary Hobson. Poor Tom. David & Charles Publishers, 1982. ISBN 978-0-434-34022-4
- Mary Hobson. Promenade. Thorpewood Publishing, 2015. ISBN 978-1-910873-00-7

Translations of Russian literature

- Mary Hobson; Aleksandr Sergeyevich Griboyedov. Aleksandr Griboedov's Woe from wit: a commentary and translation. Edwin Mellen Press; 2005. ISBN 978-0-7734-6146-8.
- Mary Hobson; Alexander Pushkin. Evgenii Onegin: A New Translation by Mary Hobson.
- Mary Hobson; Alexander Pushkin. "Friendship of Love." In Love Poems. Alma Classics Ltd, 2013. ISBN 978-1-84749-300-2
- Mary Hobson; Alexander Pushkin. Eugene Onegin.Anthem Press, 2016 ISBN 978-1-78308-458-6

Non-Fiction

- Mary Hobson. The Feast. An autobiography Thorpewood Publishing, 2015 ISBN 978-1-910873-03-8
- Mary Hobson. After Onegin. The last seven years in the poems and letters of Aleksandr Sergeevich Pushkin. Thorpewood Publishing, 2017 ISBN 978-1-910873-05-2
