= Sarah M. Hobson =

American physician

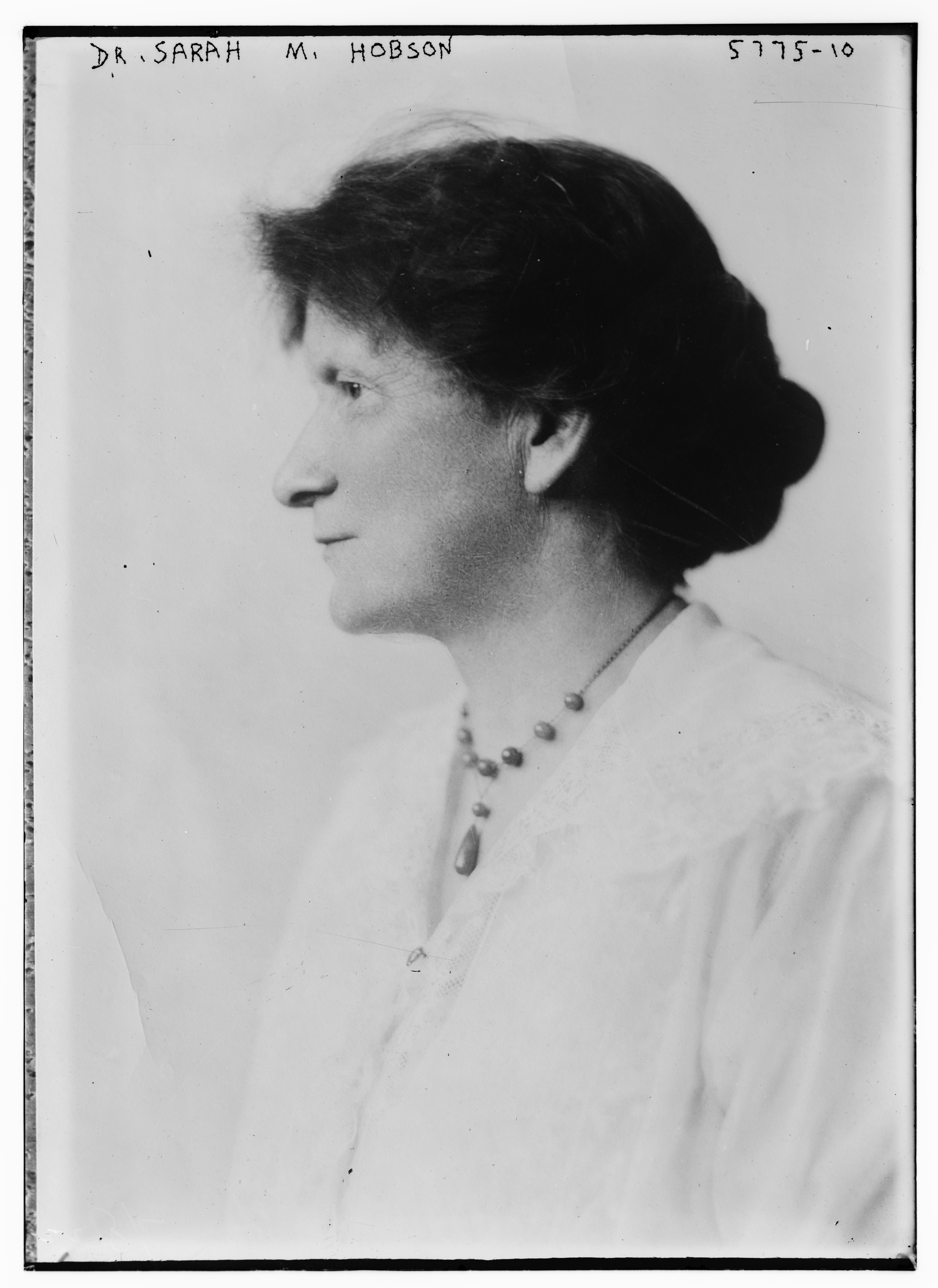
- Sarah M. Hobson, from the Bain News Service
- Born: September 25, 1861; Island Pond, Vermont, U.S.
- Died: December 4, 1950 (89); New Ipswich, New Hampshire, U.S.
- Occupation: Physician

Sarah Matilda Hobson (September 25, 1861 – December 4, 1950) was an American physician, based in Chicago from 1892 to 1931. She was editor of the Journal of the American Institute of Homeopathy from 1914 to 1920.

== Early life and education ==
Hobson was born in Island Pond, Vermont, the daughter of Samuel Decatur Hobson and Mary Elizabeth Sawyer Hobson. He father owned a lumber mill and served in the Vermont legislature. She graduated from Boston University School of Medicine in 1890. She was a member of the Chicago Alumnae Association of Kappa Kappa Gamma.

== Career ==
Hobson was an obstetrician who practiced in Chicago from 1892 to 1931, and editor of the Journal of the American Institute of Homeopathy from 1914 to 1920. She was consulting physician for the Chicago Home for the Friendless from 1900 to 1930. She was medical inspector for the Chicago Public Schools, and a consultant for the Algonquin Summer Camp and the Daily News Sanitarium. She was president of the Chicago Homeopathic Medical Association from 1910 to 1911. She was an officer of the Medical Women's Club of Chicago.

Hobson promoted advances in obstetrics, such as twilight sleep, as feminist progress. In 1922, she predicted sex selection in the future, saying "It will not be in my time, but I believe it is coming and that it is a good thing. No family should be composed of all boys or all girls. Children of both sexes should make up the normal family." In 1929 she wrote to a newspaper supporting dress reform for men and boys, "Certainly they have the same inalienable right to comfort in clothes that is claimed by the feminine half of mankind," she argued.

== Publications ==
- "Natural History in Private Schools" (1893)
- "Laboratory Work in Physiology" (1895, 1896)
- "Two Cases of Umbilical Hemorrhage" (1900)
- "Sanitary Regulations in Child Life" (1903)
- "Tuberculosis in Children, Heredity and Predisposition" (1906)
- "The Supply of Physicians" (1924)
- "The Care of our Babies: Breaking Bad Habits" (1926)

== Personal life ==
Hobson retired and left Chicago in 1933, and died in 1950, at the age of 89, in New Ipswich, New Hampshire.
