= George Hobson (footballer) =

English footballer

Personal information
- Date of birth: 28 June 1903
- Place of birth: Leeds, England
- Date of death: 29 December 1993 (aged 90)
- Position: Defender

Senior career*
Years	Team	Apps	(Gls)
- Bishop Auckland
1925–1926	Huddersfield Town	2	(0)
1927–1928	Bradford City	24	(2)
- Dulwich Hamlet
- Yorkshire Amateur

International career
1931	England Amateur	2	(0)
- * Club domestic league appearances and goals

George Hobson (28 June 1903 – 29 December 1993) was an English amateur footballer who played for professional clubs. He was capped by the England Amateur team.

== Career ==
Hobson played for Bishop Auckland, Huddersfield Town (with which he won Central League titles in 1924–25 and 1925–26), Bradford City, Dulwich Hamlet. He later captained Yorkshire Amateur and toured the Baltic states of Lithuania, Latvia and Estonia with them. He had many offers to turn professional from first division clubs but preferred to keep his amateur status due to commitments with his motor business on Albion Street in Leeds. In 1931 he won two caps for England Amateur, playing against Wales and Scotland.

His brother-in-law was jockey and trainer Harry Wragg.
