= Huffington =

Huffington is a surname. Notable people with the surname include:

- Anita Huffington (1934–2025), American sculptor
- Arianna Huffington (born 1950), Greek-American author and columnist
- Michael Huffington (born 1947), American politician
- Roy M. Huffington (1917–2008), American oilman and former U.S Ambassador to Austria

== Fictional characters ==
- Chumley Huffington, a character in the Yu-Gi-Oh! GX anime series

== See also ==
- The Huffington Post, an American progressive news website
- Uffington (disambiguation)
