= Kenneth B. Hobson =

US Air Force general (1908–1979)

Kenneth Burton Hobson
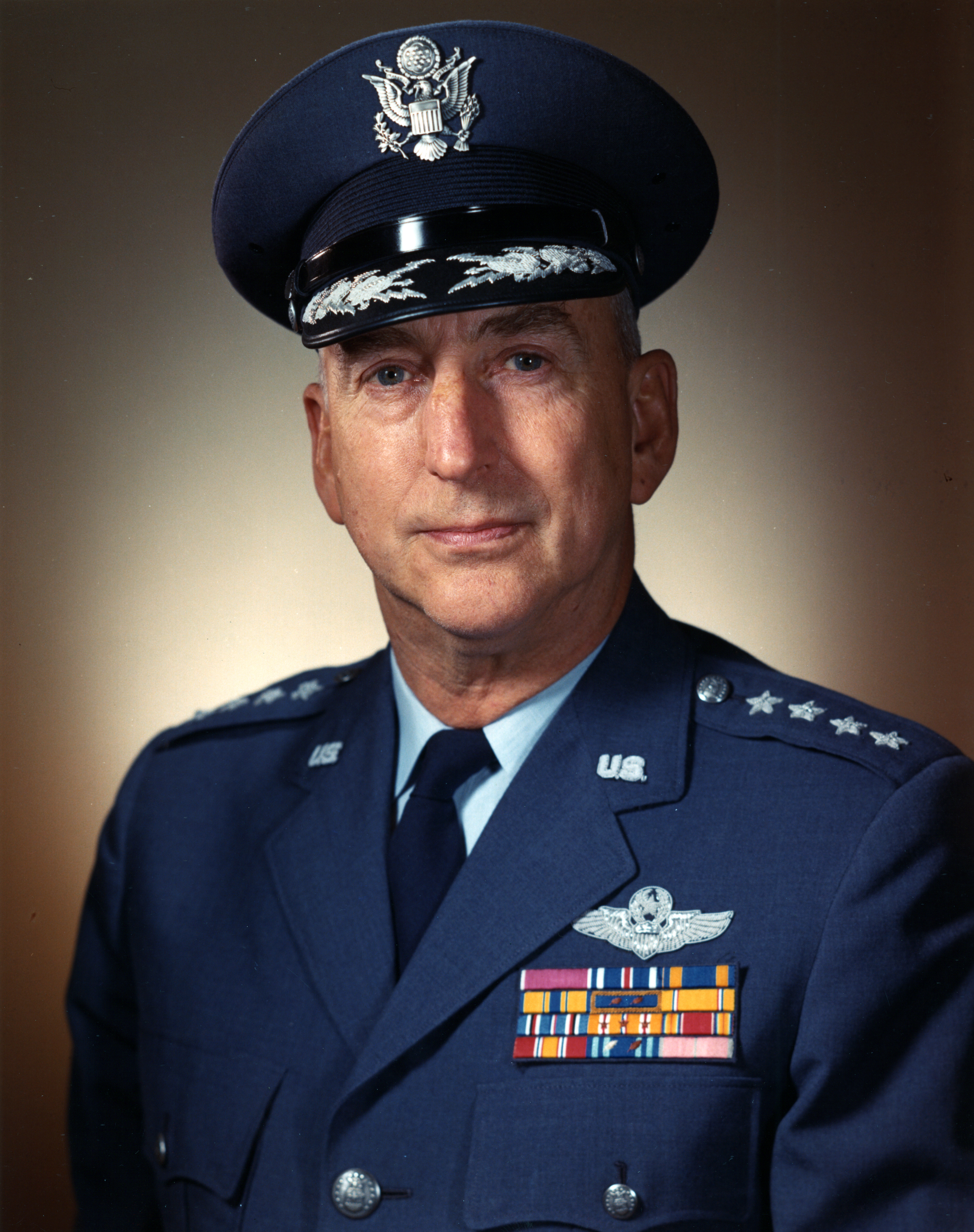
- Born: June 1, 1908; Mount Carmel, Illinois
- Died: July 20, 1979 (aged 71); Portland, Oregon
- Military career
- Allegiance: United States
- Branch: United States Air Force
- Service years: 1932–1967
- Rank: General
- Conflicts: World War II

Kenneth Burton Hobson (June 1, 1908 – July 20, 1979) was a general in the United States Air Force. He was also the former commander of the Air Force Logistics Command, Wright-Patterson Air Force Base, Ohio.

== Biography ==
Hobson was born in Mount Carmel, Illinois, in 1908. After graduating from Ashland High School in Ashland, Oregon, in 1925, he attended the University of Oregon and the Southern Oregon Normal School. In July 1928 he entered the United States Military Academy in West Point, New York and on June 10, 1932, he was commissioned a second lieutenant in the infantry.

In November 1933, Hobson received his pilot wings after graduating from primary and advanced flying schools at Randolph and Kelly fields, Texas. He was transferred to the United States Army Air Corps on February 16, 1934. Kenneth's first assignment was with the 73rd Pursuit Squadron at March Field, California. In February 1937 he joined the 80th Service Squadron at Albrook Field, Panama Canal Zone.

After a year of being hospitalized, Hobson was assigned to the 22nd Bombardment Squadron in April 1940, and served at Hamilton Field, California, and Fort Douglas, Utah. In May 1941, he assumed command of the 22nd Bombardment Squadron and the following December moved with it to the Southwest Pacific Theater.

The 22nd Bombardment Squadron was in the process of moving to the Philippines when the Japanese attacked Pearl Harbor. Three B-17s led by Hobson (then a major) completed the first flight from Hawaii to Australia over an emergency-devised South Pacific air route, arriving January 12, 1942. Then he flew his B-17 Flying Fortress to Java in the Dutch East Indies, where his squadron had been diverted in an attempt to stem the Japanese advance.

Hobson commanded the 22nd Squadron in Java, the Netherlands East Indies, and Australia until September 1942, when he became engineering officer for the Far East Service Command. The following month he was appointed operations officer, A-3 of the Fifth Bomb Command in the Southwest Pacific, and in January 1943, was named chief of staff of that command. He served in this position until June 1943.

Hobson was then assigned to the War Department General Staff, Washington, D.C., where he served until the end of World War II. In January 1946, he was assigned to Headquarters Army Air Forces as chief of the Table of Organization and Equipment Branch, Office of the Assistant Chief of Air Staff for Operations. The following June he became chief of the Organization Division.

He entered the Air War College at Maxwell Air Force Base, Alabama, in July 1947. Upon graduation in June 1948, he was assigned to Strategic Air Command Headquarters then at Andrews Air Force Base, Maryland, and later at Offutt Air Force Base, Nebraska. He assumed command of the 92nd Bomb Wing at Fairchild Air Force Base, Washington, in June 1951.

In February 1952, Kenneth was named deputy director of manpower and organization at U.S. Air Force headquarters, Washington, D.C. He became director of manpower and organization there in July 1953.

His next assignment took him to the Far East as vice commander of the Fifth Air Force in Japan on July 15, 1956. He became commander, Ogden Air Materiel Area, with headquarters at Hill Air Force Base, Utah August 3, 1959, and assumed the post of vice commander, Air Force Logistics Command (formerly AMC), August 1, 1961.

Hobson became commander of the Air Force Logistics Command on August 1, 1965.

He served on 25 aerial combat missions, totaling 100 combat hours, in the Southwest Pacific, and received bronze stars for the Papua, New Guinea and East Indies campaigns.

=== Awards ===
Among his awards and decorations were the Legion of Merit, Distinguished Flying Cross, Air Medal and the Air Force Commendation Medal.

=== Effective dates of promotion ===
Insignia	Rank	Date
	General	August 1, 1965
	Lieutenant general	August 1, 1961
	Major general	December 15, 1953
	Brigadier general	March 8, 1952
	Colonel	December 8, 1942
	Lieutenant colonel	January 23, 1942
	Major	July 22, 1941
	Captain	October 2, 1940
	First lieutenant	April 23, 1935
	Second lieutenant	June 10, 1932
