= Richard Hobson (physician) =

English physician

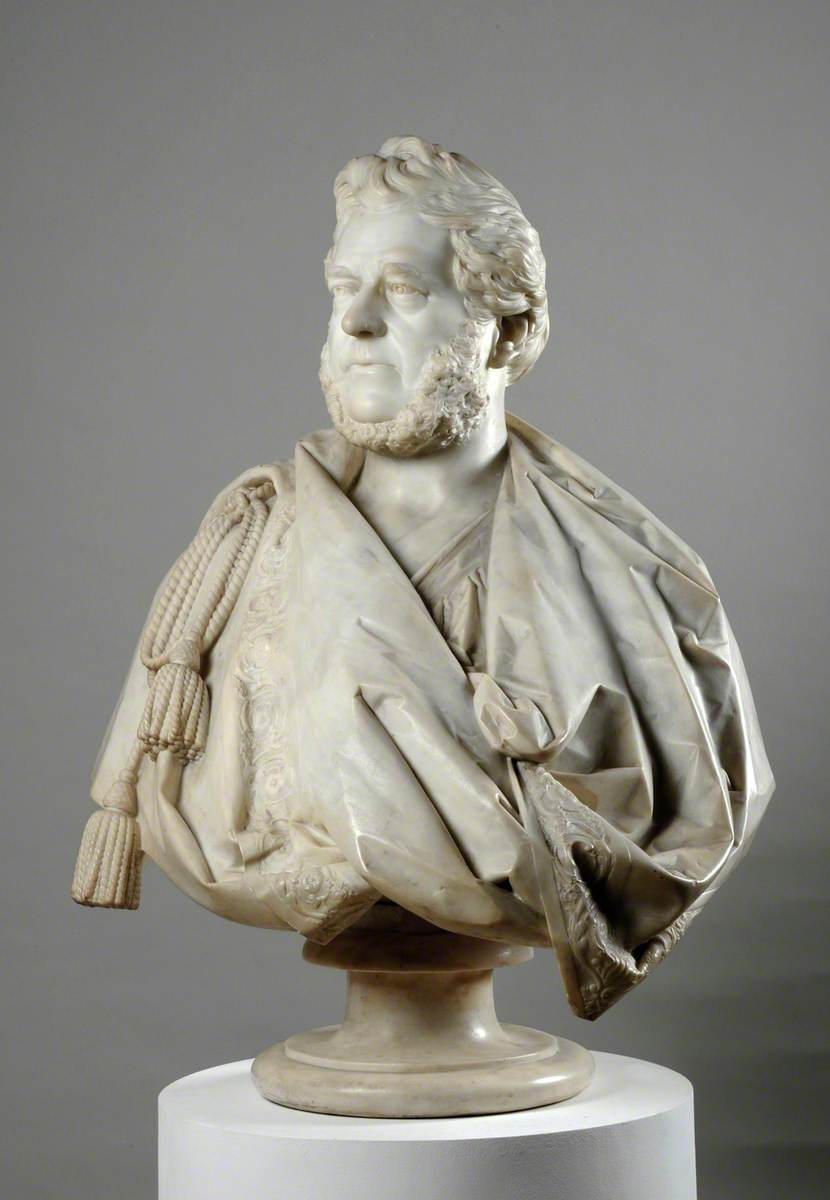
- Born: 1795; Whitehaven, Cumberland
- Died: 29 November 1868 (aged 72–73)
- Occupation: Physician

Richard Hobson (1795 – 29 November 1868) was an English physician.

== Biography ==
Hobson was born at Whitehaven, Cumberland, in 1795. After school education he was sent to study medicine at St. George's Hospital, London. He became a member of the Royal College of Surgeons, and finally deciding to become a physician, went to Queens' College, Cambridge, and there graduated M.B. in 1825, M.D. in 1830. In 1831 he settled in practice in Leeds, and on 30 September 1833 was elected physician to the infirmary there, a post which he resigned in 1843. During this period he published in the ‘Medical Gazette’ some notes on diabetes, and on the external use of croton oil. His tastes led him to frequent the turf. He belonged to the Harewood coursing club, bred racehorses, and hunted with the Bramham hunt. For a short time he kept a pack of harriers. He had some knowledge of natural history, and in 1836 became acquainted with Charles Waterton, the naturalist, who lived at Walton Hall, about twelve miles from Leeds. Here Hobson became a frequent visitor and physician to the family. Waterton often wrote to him. Their intercourse ceased a few years before Waterton's death. While it lasted Hobson states that he showed Waterton a memoir which he had written of the naturalist. This statement was not believed at Walton Hall, and the book, ‘Charles Waterton; his Home, Habits, and Handiwork,’ which Hobson published in 1866, contains abundant internal evidence that the statement about Waterton's approval of the manuscript is untrue. Many of the stories in the book are false, the letters given have been altered, and the only faithful parts of the work are the engravings of Walton Hall, some of them drawn from photographs taken by Hobson himself. A fall from his carriage made him an invalid, and while confined to the house he broke his thigh-bone, and died 29 November 1868. His wife, a daughter of Peter Rhodes of Leeds, did not long survive him. He had no children.
