= Frederick Taylor Hobson =

British Army general

Major-General Frederick Taylor Hobson
- Born: 29 March 1840
- Died: 1909 (aged 68–69)
- Military career
- Allegiance: United Kingdom
- Branch: British Army
- Rank: Major-General
- Commands: Buffs (Royal East Kent Regiment)
- Conflicts: Second Opium War

Major-General Frederick Taylor Hobson (29 March 1840 – 1909) was a British Army officer who served as colonel of the Buffs (Royal East Kent Regiment).

== Military career ==
Hobson was commissioned as an ensign in the 3rd Regiment of Foot on 30 October 1857. He fought at the Battle of Taku Forts in August 1860 during the Second Opium War and went on to become commanding officer of the Buffs (Royal East Kent Regiment) in 1886. He later served as colonel of the Buffs (Royal East Kent Regiment).
