= Scott Hobson (rugby union) =

English rugby union player

- Born: 25 January 1988 (age 38) Truro, England
- Height: 1.99 m (6 ft 6 in)
- Weight: 112 kg (17 st 9 lb)

Rugby union career
- Current team: Bath Rugby
Senior career
Years	Team	Apps	(Points)
	Cornish Pirates	32	
2009–	Bath Rugby	8	(5)
International career
Years	Team	Apps	(Points)
	England U20	14	

Scott Hobson (born 25 January 1988) is an English Rugby Union player for Bath in the Aviva Premiership.
