= Richard de Havering =

Medieval Roman Catholic clergyman

Richard de Havering (or Richard de Haverings) (died 1341) was a medieval Roman Catholic clergyman who briefly was Archbishop of Dublin.

He was the son of John de Havering, Sheriff of Hampshire and Seneschal of Gascony and his wife Margaret. He became a priest in the Roman Catholic Church.

He held the post of Constable of Bordeaux (also referred to as the king's clerk or Secretary of State). The Constable was the head of the financial administration of the Duchy of Aquitaine. He was appointed on 24 March 1305 and took office on 22 September 1305 until 7 April 1306. He was reappointed on 6 October 1306 until 10 May 1308.

He then became precentor of St Patrick's Cathedral, Dublin. He was elected Archbishop of Dublin in March 1307 and appointed 10 July of that year; although he received possession of the see's temporalities on 13 September 1307, he was never consecrated and after enjoying the dignity and profits of the see resigned 21 November 1310.

He was then presented the post of Prebendary of Aylesbury in 1310 after being chosen by the new Archbishop of Dublin, John de Leche. He was known as 'Dublin Electus'. In 1315, he became Archdeacon of Chester and appears to have died in 1341.

Richard was pursued for a debt owed by his father sometime between 1327 and 1331. This debt was accrued when his father was Sheriff of Hampshire between 1274 and 1277. His father collected money for the repair of buildings at Winchester Castle and specific amounts remained outstanding on the account.

Catholic Church titles
Preceded by Richard de Ferings	Archbishop of Dublin; 1307–1310	Succeeded by John de Leche
