= Archdeacon of Waterford =

The Archdeacon of Waterford was a senior ecclesiastical officer within firstly, the Diocese of Waterford until 1363; the Diocese of Waterford and Lismore from 1363 until 1838; and finally the Diocese of Cashel and Waterford, during which time it was combined with other Archdeaconries.

The archdeaconry can trace its history from Bartholomew, the first known incumbent, who held the office at the beginning of the thirteenth century to the last discrete incumbent Henry Line. As such he was responsible for the disciplinary supervision of the clergy and the upkeep of diocesan property within that diocese; and later, part of it.
