= St Mary the Virgin's Church, Aylesbury =

St Mary's
- Church of St Mary the Virgin
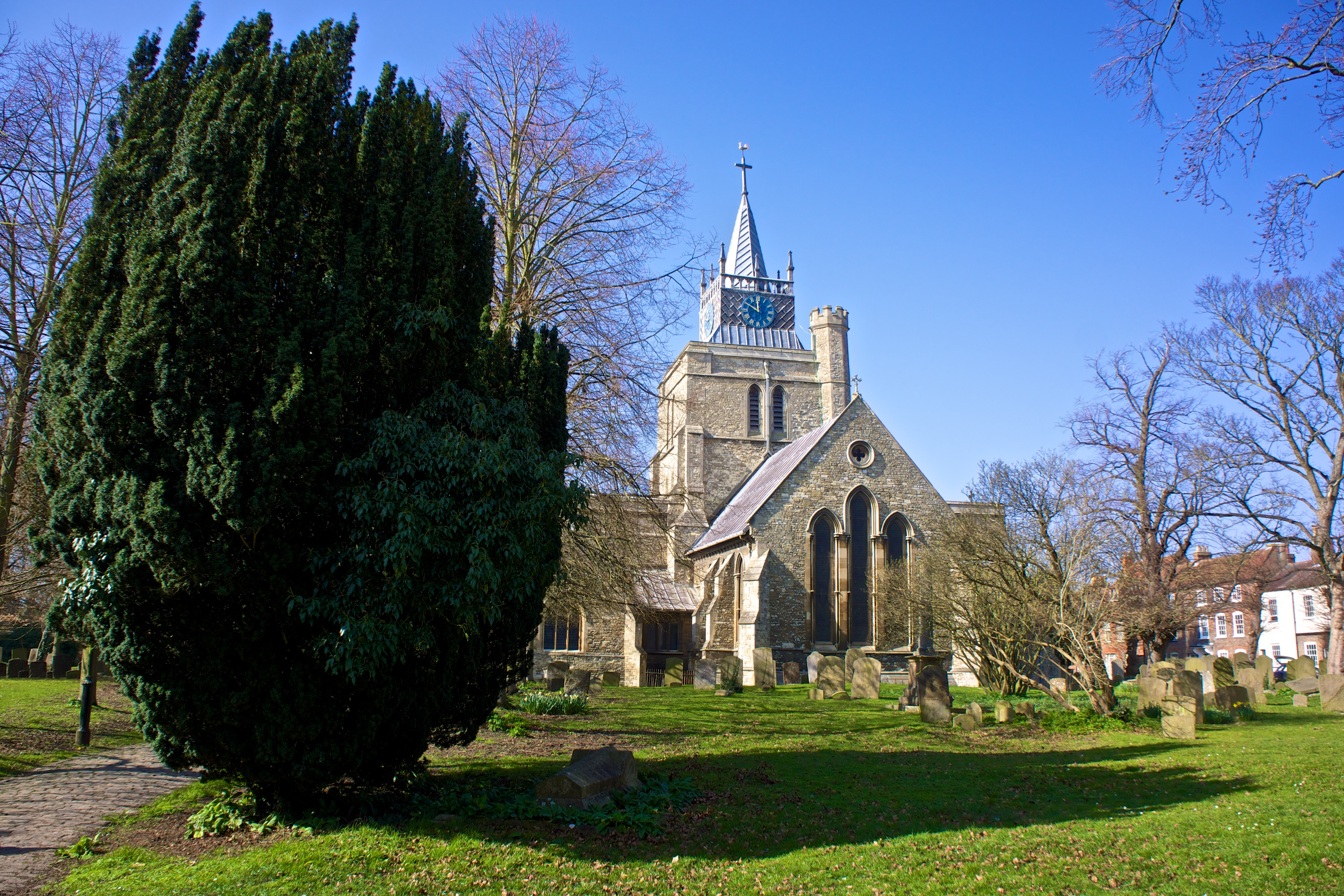
- St Mary's
- 51°49′05″N 0°48′58″W
- Location: Aylesbury
- Country: England
- Denomination: Church of England
- Tradition: Broad Church
- Website: aylesburystmary.org.uk

History
- Consecrated: 1200-1250

Specifications
- Capacity: (currently) 150 approx
- Length: 140 ft (43 m)
- Width: 66 ft (20 m)
- Height: 121 ft (37 m)

Administration
- Province: Canterbury
- Diocese: Oxford
- Archdeaconry: Buckingham

Clergy
- Bishop: Dave Bull
- Pastor: Doug Zimmerman

The Church of St Mary the Virgin, Aylesbury, is an Anglican church of the Diocese of Oxford, in the centre of the town of Aylesbury. There is evidence of a church from Saxon times, but the present building was built sometime between 1200 and 1250, with various additions and alterations in the 14th, 15th, 19th and 20th century.

The church is one of the most recognisable sights of Aylesbury; its ornate clock tower dominates the skyline. The church is currently a Grade I listed building as it is a building of exceptional interest.

== History ==
=== Saxon period ===
Aylesbury possessed a church in Saxon times; 19th-century renovations to the chapel revealed the remains of an ancient crypt, with stone steps leading from the church in the west end of the crypt, and were uncovered as fully as possible without encroaching on the south transept. There is one prominent arch in it, which those competent to decide have unhesitatingly pronounced to be Saxon. The crypt was probably the remains of an old Saxon church, possibly dating from circa 571 when Aylesbury was a Saxon settlement known as Aeglesburge.

Probably in troublous times this subterraneous chamber was used for worship but later it appears to have been used as a charnel house: piles of human bones were found within. These were removed and re-interred in the churchyard.

It is not impossible that this may have been the very site of the Saxon building where St. Osyth is said to have been buried in the 9th century. St. Osyth's burial site in Aylesbury became a site of great, though unauthorised pilgrimage; following a papal decree in 1500, the bones were removed from the church and buried in secret. However much, if any, of this has a historical basis; it is even uncertain whether there were two Osyths or one, since both Aylesbury and Chich claim her relics. However, what appears to be known is that following her death in AD 700 her father, King Redwald (in some accounts Penda), and mother, Wilburga, took her to Aylesbury to be interred.

=== 12th century ===
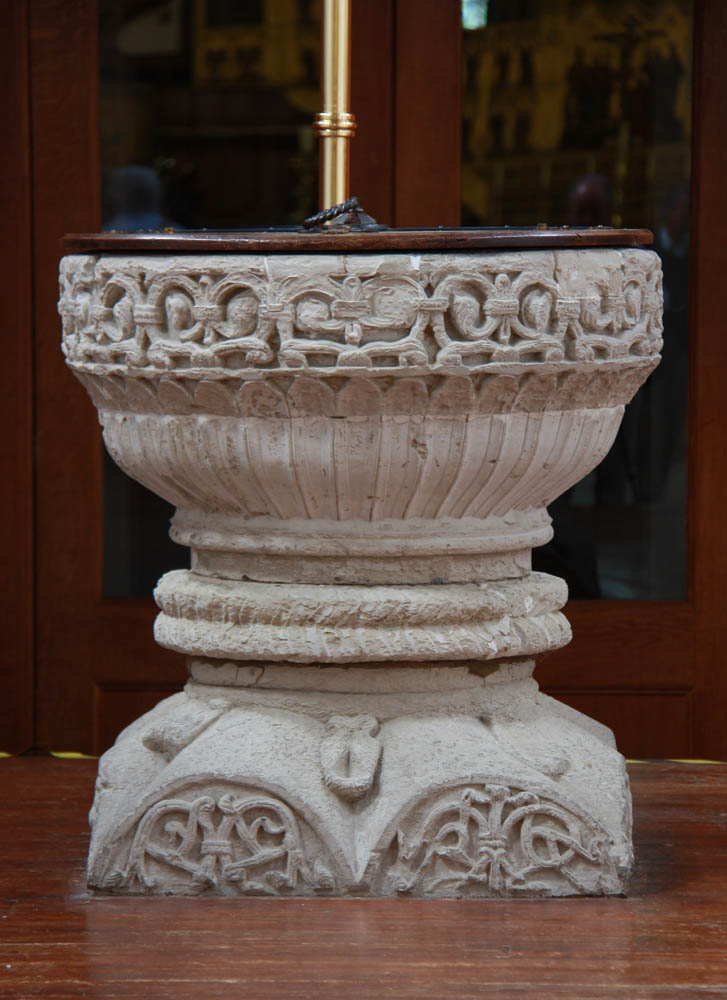
The Norman font which gives its name to a type called the 'Aylesbury fonts'

The existence of an earlier building to the one now standing may be inferred from the beautiful Norman font found within the church and the existence of other artefacts of the same age. These were found buried in debris beneath the church in the 19th century. The font in particular was found in three fragments and work was done to repair it. This font can be found at the west end of the church today and has given its name to a particular style of font known as the "Aylesbury Fonts". These fonts are normally dated late in the 12th century around the years 1170 to 1190.

The early ecclesiastical history of Aylesbury is confusing and difficult to unravel. The church was a prebend in Lincoln Cathedral. It will be seen that the Prebendary of Aylesbury was attached to the See of Lincoln as early as 1092. An early account states "It is said that a Bishop of Lincoln, desired by the Pope, give the Personage of Aylesbury to a stranger, a kinsman of his, found means to make it a Prebend, and to incorporate it to Lincoln Church." Thus, in the reign of Edward III, Aylesbury Church was part of the Deanery of Lincoln, and a separate stall in that cathedral was set aside for the dean.

During excavation work in recent years a 12th-century cloister and a conduit pipe were identified.

=== 13th century ===
The church as it stands today is supposed to have been erected at some date between 1200 and 1250 with various additions and alterations during the reign of either King John or Henry III of England. Originally the church was a strictly cruciform design which is to say with a; chancel, nave, transepts and tower. It still retains substantially that form, though altered and modified at various periods.

During the 11th through 14th centuries, a wave of building of cathedrals and smaller parish churches occurred across Western Europe. Aylesbury seems to have been part of this. In addition to being a place of worship, the church at this time would have been used by the community in other ways. It could have served as a meeting place for guilds or a hall for banquets. Mystery plays were sometimes performed, and they might also be used for fairs. The church could have also been used as a place to thresh and store grain.

=== 14th century ===
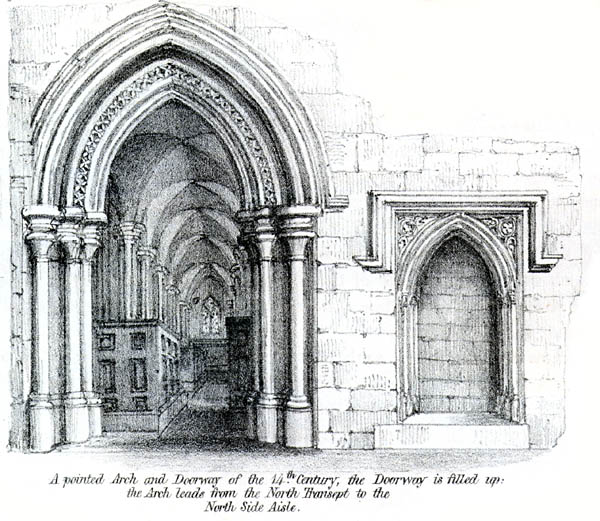
St Mary the Virgin, Aylesbury (pointed arch and doorway of the 14th century)

One of the most interesting portions of church is that of the Lady Chapel which is a beautiful erection of the 14th century. In this chapel an old sedilia (stone seats, found on the liturgical south side of an altar) was found in the wall in their proper position.

It is supposed that the old fabric of the church extended no farther than the nave, having a high pitched roof springing from the walls. The light thus obtained being insufficient, it is thought that the clerestory, and the flat roof, were added in the 15th century. The east ends of the north and south chapels were probably extended about the same time, so as to form two larger chapels known today as the Chapel of St George and the Chapter House.

=== 15th century ===
In 1450, a religious institution called the Guild of St Mary was founded in Aylesbury by John Kemp, Archbishop of York. Known popularly as the Guild of Our Lady it became a meeting place for local dignitaries and a hotbed of political intrigue. The guild was influential in the final outcome of the Wars of the Roses. Its premises at the Chantry in Church Street, Aylesbury, are still there, though today the site is occupied mainly by almshouses. It is likely the incumbent at St Mary's would have been paid to perform a stipulated number of masses during a stipulated period of time for the guild in the chapel.

According to a tablet formerly in the church and dated as far back as 1494, John Stone of Aylesbury gave by will two tenements to the parish. The rents of which were to be applied to maintain a clock and chimes in the tower of Aylesbury Church for ever.

The tower piers began to fail at an early period, and from time to time various expedients were resorted to, to strengthen them. An arch between the south-east pier and the transept must evidently have been frightfully crushed as early at least as the 15th century when it was blocked up and the pier buttresses both towards the transept and the lady chapel. At the same time the southern and eastern arches of the tower itself appear to have been much injured and to have lost their true curves. It might possibly have been about the same time that the arch on the west side of the transept was walled up and the south-west pier of the tower buttressed on its south side.

During this period it is thought the Lady Chapel and sacristy (now called the vestry) was constructed on the east side of the north and south transept respectively. The sacristy is to appearances the oldest part of the building today. An oaken wardrobe in which is an ingeniously incorporated a swinging horse on which the priest's vestments were hung is still found in the church to this day and dates from the 15th century. There is also a strong locker in which it is supposed the sacred vessels were deposited. Above the sacristy is a room called the priest's chamber or priest's hole. The walls of this corner of the building are of immense strength, and the door is a very massive and remarkable one of the 15th century.

=== 16th century ===
At a much later period (as is shown by the date 1596 upon the stonework) the remaining sides of the south-west pier were encased in stonework. A little later still in 1599 the same operation was performed on the north-west pier, and probably at the same time the arch abutting against it was walled up.

King Henry VIII had himself declared Supreme Head of the Church in England in February 1531. The following acts which led to the dissolution of the monasteries impinged relatively little on English parish church activity. Parishes that had formerly paid their tithes to support a religious house, now paid them to a lay impropriator, but rectors, vicars and other incumbents remained in place, their incomes unaffected and their duties unchanged. In 1534 the church became part of the newly formed Church of England, forever separated from the Roman Catholic Church

In 1536 almost a third of the county of Buckinghamshire became the personal property of King Henry VIII. Henry VIII was also responsible for making Aylesbury the official county town over Buckingham, which he is alleged to have been done in order to curry favour with Thomas Boleyn so that he could marry his daughter Anne Boleyn. This set the church on a path of expansion to the church it is today.

Under his son, King Edward VI, more Protestant-influenced forms of worship were adopted. Under the leadership of the Archbishop of Canterbury, Thomas Cranmer, a more radical reformation proceeded. A new pattern of worship was set out in the Book of Common Prayer (1549 and 1552).

Henry VIII and his son Edward VI dismissed Catholicism and its trimmings. Then pro-Catholic Mary Tudor became queen. She attempted to re-establish the Catholic faith, including efforts to replace damaged, defaced and destroyed church artefacts. Mary was too late to prevent the whitewashing of church interiors and many irreplaceable wall paintings were lost.

In the north transept is an alabaster monument to Lady Lee, wife of Sir Henry Lee of Ditchley, personal Champion to Queen Elizabeth I. It was formerly profusely ornamented with gold and colouring and is of the time of Elizabeth I, as Lady Lee died in 1584.

Aylesbury Grammar School was founded in 1598 following a bequest from Sir Henry Lee and its first home was inside the church. The grammar school ran from 9am and 2pm. One of the trustees of the school was the Vicar of Aylesbury

=== 17th century ===
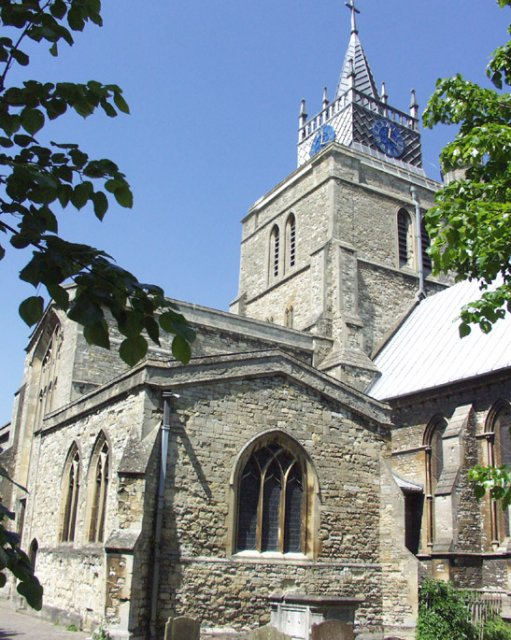
The tower contains a clock (1690s) and is topped by a Restoration-period spire, reaching 121 feet (37 m)

In 1611 the Aylesbury Grammar School moved to what was then church buildings. These buildings now house the County Museum. The school remained here until 1907.

In 1622 the south-east pier underwent a second buttressing, and at perhaps some other period the casing was built round that to the north-east, and its arches walled up. This is proof that in one instance at least (that of the south-west pier) the second casing failed at an early date, as is shown by the large clamps which have been added to it. There have subsequently there been continued failures in casing of both of the western piers.

On Aylesbury Church there are no monuments from the 17th century or before, and it did not at the time of its restoration in the 18th century contain a single particle of ancient coloured glass. Therefore, the church during this period is said to have undergone some exceedingly rough usage. During restoration work in the 19th century, they opened some of the closed archways prior to beginning work. Injuries to the building were to be observed inflicted on the ornamental stone work, which could not have been the result of accident. This damage was ascribed to the period of the English Civil War during the reign of King Charles I. Exposed as the Aylesbury district was to the full force of the mischievous effects of the civil commotions of that period, it would indeed have been extraordinary if this church above all others had escaped the ravages and excesses of those unfortunate times, when the noblest ecclesiastical structures of our country were plundered, defamed, and defaced. Let us not forget the so-called Battle of Aylesbury on 1 November 1642. Indeed, in August 1642, Nehemiah Wharton, a Parliamentarian soldier, writes from Aylesbury, telling his friends how they attacked a man called Penruddock, whom he called a Papist. He said the attack was because he had been "basely affronted by Penruddock and his dog". Finally he adds that he and his men "showed their zeal" and "got into the church, defaced the ancient and sacred glazed pictures, and burned the holy rails".

A description of the church says how there was an old gallery in the church with its bird-cage pew. This pew was completely enclosed with lattice work and its front was ornamented with filigree work, presenting the appearance of a box at the opera, and thus named the bird-cage. This was the old manor pew, and was occupied by the judges and high sheriff at the assize sermon, and used upon other state occasions. The church also had a pulpit at the front which was nicknamed by the congregation a 'three-decker'.

Some of the pews in the body of the church were fitted with brass rails and hangings to make them more private. In the north chapel were the high pews which were raised some feet above the floor and reached by three or four steps. The whole of the nave was filled with panelled pews over which the occupiers claimed exclusive and permanent right; it was thought something grand to be known as the owner of a 'faculty pew'. The divisions which were exceedingly high, were adorned according to the various owners; some were lined with blue cloth and bedizened with an abundance of large brass-headed nails; others would be scarlet; green baize was the prevailing 'comfort', whilst some of less pretensions were satisfied with paint. These pews were of all shapes and sizes, without the least pretense to uniformity. There was a jealous feeling respecting possession of pews; and it was a common practice for many of the owners to keep the doors carefully locked. When the wicked man came into church, his arrival was announced by the clicking of the locks of pew doors.

The Commissioners and Visitors appointed to purify the church in the Protectorate of Oliver Cromwell listed the Rev John Barton of Aylesbury a 'scandalous minister' and it was voted that he would be expelled. On 8 July 1642 information in writing was given to the House of Commons that John Barton had spoken against the Parliament. As a result, he was sent for and delivered to Parliament in custody of the Sergeant-at-Arms. John Barton did not deny the words and was committed to the 'Gatehouse' on 18 July, but discharged on 26 July of the same month. Subsequently, he was driven from the vicarage.

In 1691 it was arranged at a parish vestry that John Aylward who was a clockmaker, of Aylesbury was to have the tenements left by John Stone in 1494 for a period of 31 years at a peppercorn rent providing he erected and maintained a substantial clock and chimes in the tower of the church. The estate was described commonly as the Clock and Chimes Estate.

The tower of the church is crowned by a small spire which is believed to date from the reign of Charles II.

=== 18th century ===
The pews mentioned were still present in the 18th century. The Prebendal House was at times unoccupied for considerable periods and during which no use was made of the family pew. In 1759 'Dear Dell' seems to have asked John Wilkes to allow him to use the unoccupied pew, but notwithstanding the cordiality subsisting between them, and the obligations John Wilkes was under to 'Dear Dell', he is refused. John Wilkes writes in reply, "I cannot lend you my pew tho' I wou'd willingly assist your piety. I will tell you the particular reason (which you cannot guess) when I see you."

In 1756 it was proposed that a gallery should be erected. It was also agreed that the 'middle aisle' of the church be 'cieled'.

Also in 1756 a charge appears in the Aylesbury churchwardens book 'for setting the yew tree in the Churchyard'. It is not very clearly shown why. Old writers have explained its cultivation as necessary for the purpose of keeping up a stock of bows for archers, and others that it was planted to screen the church from the effects of storms and tempests.

In the year 1765 the state of the fabric of the church excited the serious attention of the parishioners and a Mr. Keen, a surveyor, was called in to report on its condition. His report confirmed the opinion of those assembled in vestry which was that the building was in a very unsafe state and required re-erection. It was resolved that his report be printed and published and copies sent to all the owners of estates in the parish with a request that they would pay after the rate of sixpence in the pound on their rentals for the space of ten years. This proposition does not seem to have been very popular as no further efforts were then made to obtain the money from them.

Before a general restoration of the church in the 19th century a portion only of the building, partitioned off from the transepts, was used for public worship. At this time the south transept resembled a marine store; this considerable part of the building was then used as the receptacle of all the paraphernalia of the parish fire brigade.

=== 19th century ===
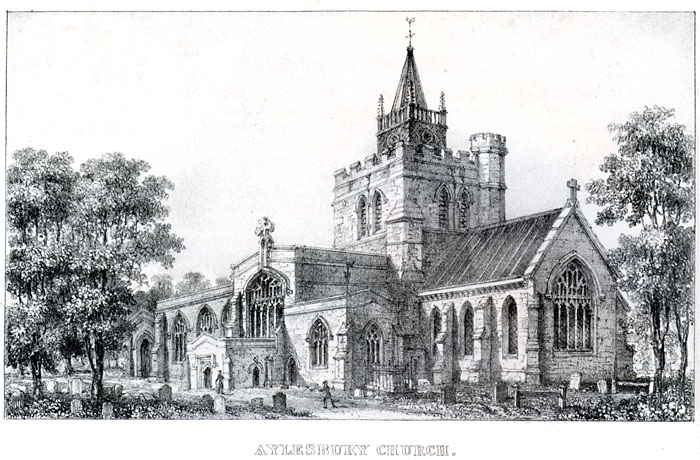
St Mary's Church, Aylesbury (Pre 1869, exact date unknown)

In the times of the Napoleonic Wars, the stock of gunpowder required for the local regiments was stored in the innermost parts of the church.

In 1821 the churchwardens expended £250 in erecting a stable, coach house, and washhouse; this outlay was not satisfactory to the Charity Commissioners. These properties were situated somewhere in the vicinity of Temple Square.

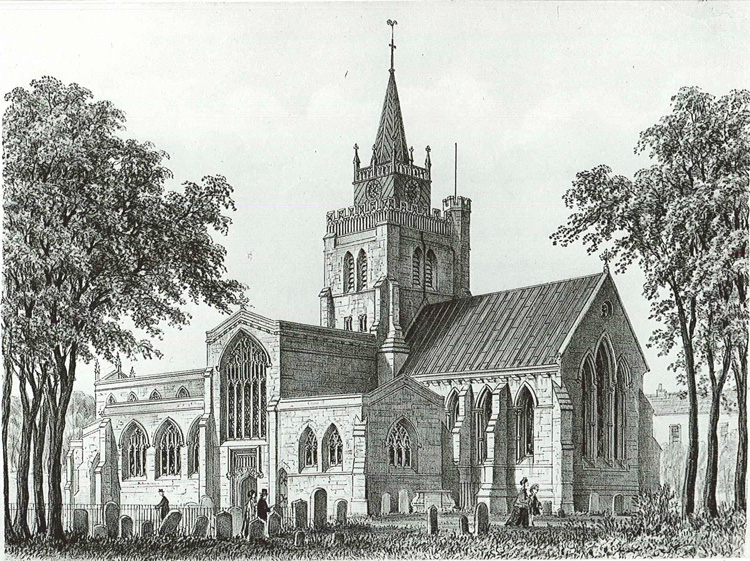
St Mary's Church, Aylesbury (1869)

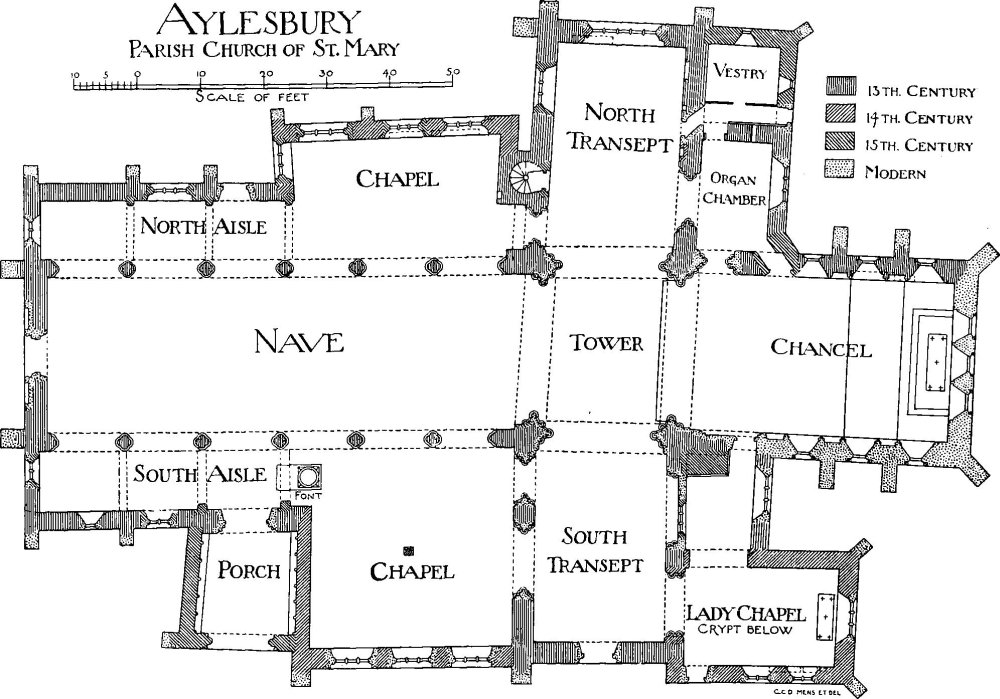
Plan of St Mary's Church, Aylesbury (1800s)

Extensive renovations works were carried out after a report from the 1830s. Prior to the restoration of the church the mural tablets were distributed in all parts of the building, but were mostly erected in the chancel and north transept.

The church had been under the process of what is called 'churchwardening' for many years, and a considerable debt was incurred for worse than useless patching. The real work of restoration commenced as far back as the year 1842, during the church wardenship of Mr. Fowler and Mr. Field. They first tried their hands on the interior of the south transept. For their services they received the thanks of a vestry, accompanied by a request that they would continue their labours. It was, however, found that the expenses would be very great, and it was hopeless to expect to raise anything like the sum required, by church-rates or appeals to the parishioners only.

A surveyor from London had been consulted upon the state of the church many years before 1848, and his report was a very concise one. He gave it as his opinion that the church might probably stand until he got to Watford, but that it would fall before he reached home. On 24 September 1848, during the Sunday morning service, the chimes being silenced as usual, the fastenings by which they were held gave way, and caused a great clatter in the tower. Many thought the prophecy made by the surveyor had come to pass and that the church was actually falling. There was a panic, and a great rush made by many of the congregation to escape from the supposed falling ruins; some scrambled over the tops of the pews, some tumbled over each other in attempting to make their way out, and for a time there was utter confusion. When the more timid had reached the churchyard, and their fears had become somewhat allayed by finding that there was nothing whatever the matter, they returned to their seats, and the service was resumed and continued.

An 1848 survey by Sir Gilbert Scott revealed considerable problems with the foundations, and thus the walls and the roof.

At a vestry held in 1849, this report was taken into consideration. Mr. Tindal received a mandate from the Archdeacon to do the necessary repairs to the fabric of the building. The object of the vestry, therefore, was to sanction the borrowing of £3,000 for the purposes of repairs. This vestry was an exceedingly stormy one, the borrowing of the money being vehemently opposed by the leading Nonconformists. The vestry decided in favour of the plan, and a poll of the parish was demanded. The poll remained open two days, and ended in a majority of 281 in favour of the motion for obtaining the money by borrowing. At the Easter vestry which followed soon after, Mr. Z. D. Hunt was chosen parish churchwarden, when he requested that he might be allowed to state in what spirit he took office. It appeared to him that the grant of £3,000 should be laid out with the most scrupulous care, and only for those repairs which were necessary in furnishing the poor with religious instruction. Not one shilling of this money should be laid out in decorations or ornamental work of any kind. He was determined to carry out this principle. He believed this view of the case was not a peculiar one, as it was announced by the members of the scheme at the vestry and he had no doubt that the decorations needed in the church would be done by subscription raised in another way. Pews, galleries, partitions, and other impediments were swept away and sold, and contracts entered into, not only for necessary repairs, but also for the restoration of the interior. The church was closed, and public worship held in the County Hall.

An ecclesiastical census was carried out throughout England on 30 March 1851 to record the attendance at all places of worship. The returns issued by St Mary's at this time was that on the Sunday morning 700 people were in the congregation with 180 in Sunday school giving a total of 880. On Sunday evening it records 800 people were in the congregation with 180 in Sunday school giving a total of 980.

On Whitsun 1851, the congregation again met in the church for public worship, but the restoration was far from being complete. The seats had not been erected, and the worshippers were accommodated with chairs. The restoration of the chancel had not yet been begun.

In May 1852, a vestry was convened by the churchwardens for considering the best mode of raising the necessary for reseating the church and the principle that it should be effected by voluntary contributions was also approved.

In the autumn of 1853, the work was revived in earnest, the only delay being caused by disputes raised by some few of the parishioners with regard to their supposed rights to seats, some demanding to occupy the same sites on which their old pews formerly stood. The seating was not completed until 1854, and the finishing touches were not yet given to the nave. Opening services were held about this time. The chancel remained unfinished but the north side of it had been restored at the expense of the Prettyman family. The remainder was left nearly untouched, and for a considerable time it was screened off from the rest of the church. This restoration was at length carried out in its entirety at a cost of about £1,000, and the chancel was reopened in 1855.

The interior of the church had not long been finished when the idea of crowning the work by the restoration of the exterior was entertained. It was not however until 1865 this was set about in earnest. At a private meeting of the subscribers of the voluntary Church Service Fund, held at the vestry-place in March of that year, a report of Mr. Scott, dated 7 November 1864, was read. In July following a public vestry was held for submitting Mr. Scott's estimate and report. The difficulty appeared to be the raising of the requisite funds. The question to be decided was the expediency of raising £1,500 by rate, and the remainder by voluntary contribution; the vestry drifted into a discussion on church-rates. Some churchmen were in favour of making a rate, others were reluctant to launch into a parish squabble. At length Mr, Acton Tindal, who was churchwarden, stated that he accepted this upon the condition that he should not be called upon to levy a church-rate by any compulsory means, a statement which had considerable effect. A Restoration Committee was appointed. Finding the general feeling of the vestry to be opposed to a church-rate, the committee depended entirely upon the voluntary principle for support, and their appeal for the necessary funds was well responded to.

By the following September £1,558 had been subscribed, and the first contract was entered into for the restoration of the west end, which was commenced in the spring of 1866, and as subscriptions came in liberally, it was determined to carry out the work in a more thorough manner than was at first contemplated. All the coverings of rough cast, with the ugly plinths of Roman cement, were removed, and a handsome wall facing of stone substituted; the buttresses were rebuilt on solid foundations reaching down to the rock, and good stone plinths added, following as nearly as possible the old lines. The foundations are now even more substantial than when the church was first erected.

The exterior of the building was extensively repaired and straightened. The completion of the work of restoration was celebrated with thanksgiving services on 28 September 1869, on which occasion Dr. Samuel Wilberforce, Bishop of Oxford, and Dr. Harold Browne, Bishop of Ely, now of Winchester (a native of the town), preached sermons. The proceedings of the day were more than usually of an imposing character; the church was handsomely and extensively decorated, and the bells rang merrily; between the services a public luncheon was held in the Corn Exchange, which was largely attended. The sum of £800 was subscribed at the celebration of the re-opening, leaving little or nothing remaining, to clear off the whole of the liabilities of the restoration, which, from first to last, amounted to a sum approaching £16,000 (£731,000 today).

=== 20th century ===
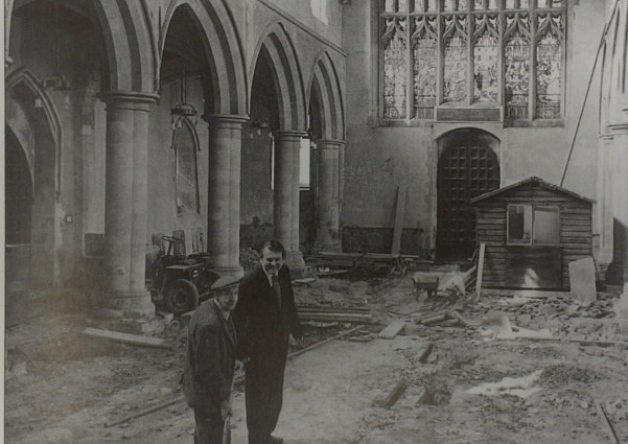
St Mary's Church, Aylesbury (1978)

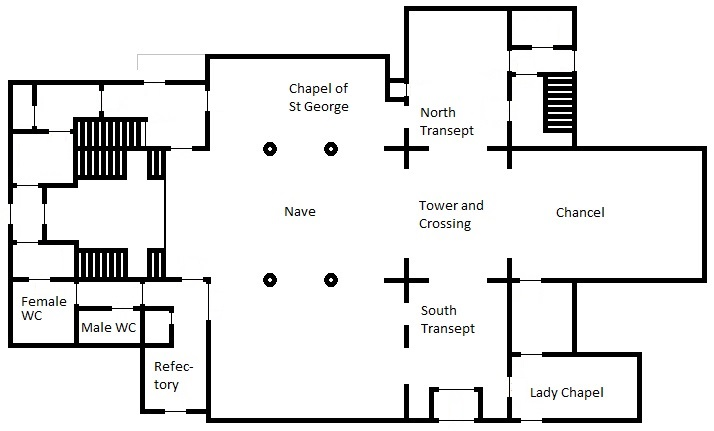
St Mary's Church, Aylesbury (plan of church, 2015)

In the 1970s the church was again considered perilously unstable, and at one time appeared to be facing demolition.

In January 1976 following storm damage the battlemented parapet at the top of the tower was removed.

Funds were raised and the church was closed in April 1978 for the work to commence. The building was virtually gutted so that a major restoration project could start. It was planned over the coming year to spend more than £250,000 to change it to a dual-purpose building for both religious and social activities. The work was completed within a year and a new; internal layout, floor, lighting, heating system etc. was installed.

A refectory was constructed in the old south porch of the church moving the main entrance to one on the south transept.

=== 21st century ===
The building is once again looking at requiring renovation. A large amount of money needs to be spent on re-roofing the South side of the church due to issues with the roof leaking in the south transept, chapter house, and refectory.

== Churchyard ==
The churchyard of St Mary’s appears to have been much bigger in the Late Saxon and medieval periods. Skeletons have been found at 12 Church Street in a water main trench and in the cellars of 14 Temple Square and 2 St Mary’s Square. Documentary evidence suggests that St Mary’s was the site of a late Saxon minster. Other documentary evidence suggests there was an 11th-century mint based here under Edward the Confessor.

Some late Saxon and medieval activity other than burials have been identified in this area, such as 10th- to 12th-century ditches, pits and wells, pottery and animal remains at the corner of Temple and Bourbon Streets after house demolition. A Saxon ditch and 12th- to 14th-century pits and wells were found in the excavations at the Prebendal, the site of a medieval manor. Place-name evidence suggests that Aylesbury may have been the site of a Saxon burh, but there is little physical evidence for this apart from the ditch at the Prebendal.

Tradition tells us that Aylesbury Churchyard used to be the rendezvous for the idle and dissolute characters of the town. It also tells us that all manners of sports and games were carried on there including cock-shying and the like. Soldiers are reported to have been flogged there. No proofs now exist of such proceedings but it is not at all improbable they occurred.

Even as late as at the commencement of the 18th century it was usual to hold the borough elections in the churchyard. The candidates, their nominators and seconders one after another mounted an old tomb (now removed), to address the constituents. When no contest followed, the proceedings ended here, but in the case of a poll an adjournment was made to the County Hall, where the subsequent proceedings were held. The nominations at the contested election of 1802 were made on this old tomb; this was the last occasion, as after the addition of the Hundred (county division) in 1804, the election no longer being a town matter only, all the proceedings were transferred to the County Hall.

Whilst there are no ancient memorials on the north side, there is ample proof that the south side was so crowded with interments that further burials in that part were impossible; and, there being no other parish burial place, it was imperative to make use of the unpopular portion which had been avoided by former generations. The victims of the law at Aylesbury who met with ignominious deaths at the hands of the hangman, and whose bodies escaped the experiments of the anatomist, or were not given over to their friends for interment, were buried "behind Church", without Christian burial, and so were the bodies of suicides and wayfarers.

Aylesbury Churchyard was intersected by several useless public footways, now stopped up; an entrance existed at the western comer, from which a public path ran parallel with the Prebendal wall to the west end of the church; another path from the same entrance led to the south door.

There was a public way in a line with Parson's Fee into Church Row, and an open path from Church Row to the church. There was also an unauthorised straggling path eastward of the chancel; there was no outside fence, nor did anything like the present palisade exist; a decayed post and rail ran round on the north side, but it was so dilapidated as to be useless. The churchyard was "an open sepulchre" the boys of the Aylesbury Grammar School; indeed, the boys of the town generally, made a playground of it, till the damage done was so considerable that an old parish beadle was appointed to concentrate his energies in keeping order in the burial place. Aylesbury must not be considered to have been singular in regard to these shortcomings, as they were general in bygone years.

As a burial place Aylesbury Churchyard was much overcrowded; and it was with difficulty that grave space could be found for an interment without disturbing the remains of an already existing occupant. It was found imperative to close it, and it was closed at the end of the year 1857; the cemetery in the Tring Road was then consecrated and opened. Occasionally interments take place in the churchyard.

== Music ==
Music performs a role in St Mary's church and community life, particularly at formal worship, and other activities that take place in the building.

=== Bells ===
In 1773 a new peal of bells was opened, probably with consecration. Three old bells were exchanged with Pack and Chapman of London for new ones. The total sum subscribed was £106 4s. The saints' bell in the tower is the oldest. It bears the date of 1612, and 'G.T." probably the initials of the bell founder. Today there are a total of nine bells: the sanctus bell, the six from 1773 and two bells from 1850 made by Mears of London.

=== Organ ===
The original church organ, a gift of a Mrs Mary Pitches, was accepted at a vestry meeting in February 1782. At the meeting £20 a year was voted to an organist, the sum to be raised by equal taxation on all parish dwelling houses rateable to the poor. Mrs Pitches, at her death in 1800, bequeathed £500 to provide dividends to be paid to an appointed church organist.

This organ was built by Green of Lichfield; it was improved in 1858, and probably little of the original instrument now remains.

The organ has occupied different positions in the church. First, it was erected in an organ loft gallery which filled the tower and faced the nave with the organist and choir sat at its front. It was afterwards removed to the centre of the west end close to the west door. It remained there for a short time, and at the general restoration of the church in the 19th century was placed in a chamber or recess in the north transept. J. W. Walkers had a two-manual organ which they maintained until the 1978 refit. This was then moved by raising it high into the north transfer (allegedly to allow gymnastics to take place across the floor space underneath, which never did occur). Hill Norman and Beard took over maintenance and also installed a small 'Chester' pipe organ of five extended ranks into the north side west end of the church. The choir also moved to sing from underneath the west window on a gallery designed for the purpose. The new organ and rebuild was opened by recital organist Peter Hurford in 1979.

The organ stopped working several years ago and an electric organ takes its place. The original organ though remains in non-functioning condition.

=== Choir ===
The choir helps to lead worship each Sunday at the Parish Eucharist. It also sings at special civic services, carol services, and weddings.

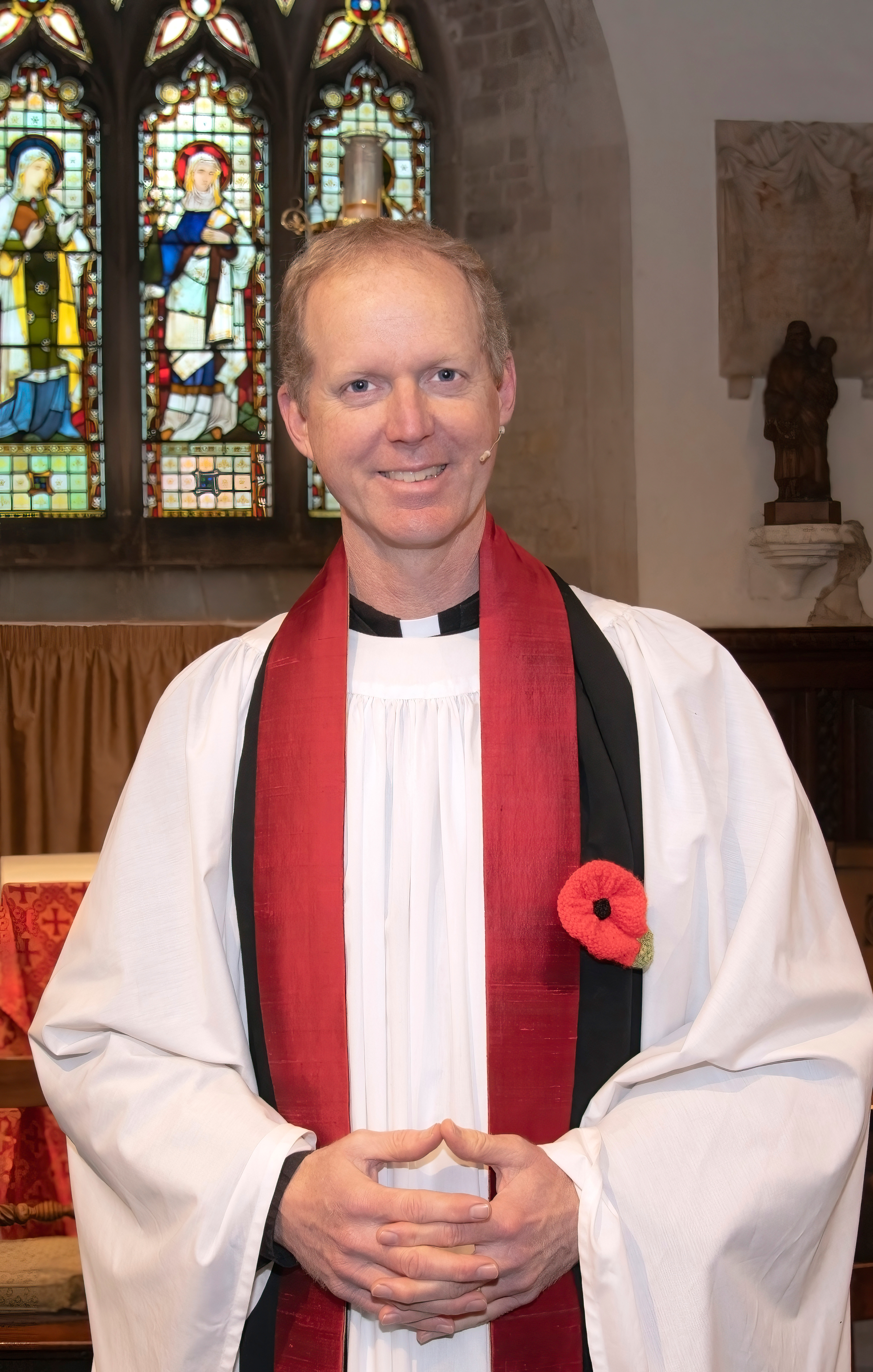
Father Doug Zimmerman Rector of St. Mary's, Aylesbury

==== The Friends of St Mary's ====
The Friends of St Mary's organises concerts of classical music at the church, including an extended evening concert about once a month.

== See also ==
- Vicars of the Parish Church of St. Mary the Virgin, Aylesbury
- Prebendaries of Aylesbury
