= Robert of Ghent =

12th-century Chancellor of England and cleric

- Dean of York
- See: Diocese of York
- Appointed: spring 1147
- Term ended: after October 1154
- Predecessor: William of St. Barbara
- Successor: Robert Butevilain
- Other posts: Provost of Beverley (unlikely); Lord Chancellor

Personal details
- Born: c. 1085
- Died: after 1154

Lord Chancellor
- In office 1140–1154
- Monarchs: Stephen; Henry II
- Preceded by: Philip de Harcourt
- Succeeded by: Thomas Becket

Robert of Ghent, also called Robert de Gant, (c. 1085–after 1154) was Lord Chancellor of England and Dean of York in the 12th century. The younger son of a nobleman, Robert was probably a member of the cathedral chapter of York before his selection as chancellor by King Stephen of England in the mid-1140s. He is not mentioned often in documents from his time as chancellor, but why this is so is unknown. He became dean at York Minster around 1147. Robert was slightly involved in the disputes over who would be Archbishop of York in the late 1140s and 1150s, but it is likely that his chancellorship prevented his deeper involvement in diocesan affairs. He was no longer chancellor after the death of Stephen, but probably continued to hold the office of dean until his death around 1157 or 1158.

== Early life ==
Robert was probably one of the sons of Gilbert de Gant, who is mentioned in the Domesday Book. (Note: The Fasti Ecclesiae Anglicanae only states that Robert was probably a son of Gilbert, but two other works are definitive that Gilbert was Robert's father.) Gilbert was from Flanders and came to England during 1069. Gilbert, who died around 1095, was married to Alice, daughter of Hugh de Montfort. Robert's conjectured siblings were Emma (wife of Alan de Percy), Hugh de Montfort-sur-Risle, Gilbert de Gant (who died before his father), and Walter de Gant. If Robert was a son of Gilbert, he was a younger son, probably the youngest of the four brothers, and was probably born sometime around 1085, as his supposed parents married about 1075, and there were older siblings. Robert is often confused in the historical records with another Robert, son of Walter. Robert was probably also the uncle of Gilbert de Gant, later Earl of Lincoln.

Robert's first appearance in the historical record is at Ramsey Abbey sometime between 1114 and 1123, where he appears as a witness to a charter. A further appearance is in a document of his brother Walter, dated between 1130 and 1139. It is likely that Robert was a canon of York Cathedral before 1147. He is also claimed to have held the office of Provost of Beverley Minster as the immediate predecessor to Thomas Becket, but this is unlikely, as Becket did not become provost until 1154, long after Robert had become Dean of York.

== Chancellor ==
Robert was Lord Chancellor from spring 1140 to summer 1154, serving King Stephen of England. It is not known exactly when Stephen appointed Robert chancellor nor why Stephen chose him for the office. Historian Richard Sherman speculated that Stephen appointed Robert as a favour to Walter de Gant, perhaps because of Walter's presence at the Battle of Cowton Moor in 1138. Three charters, which date from March 1140 to January 1141 and are supposed to be witnessed by Robert, all have difficulties with either the dating or whether the signature attributed to Robert is actually his, so exact dating of his term of office isn't possible from charter evidence. For a brief period in 1141, Stephen's rival Empress Matilda also appointed two chancellors – William de Vere and William fitzGilbert – but they did not interrupt Robert's term of service. Robert was with Stephen at Caistor during the middle of 1143, where he was a witness on charters. Throughout his approximately 14 years as chancellor, Robert only witnessed 20 charters for certain and perhaps another 13 that are not securely attributed to Robert. Stephen's two previous chancellors, Roger le Poer and Philip de Harcourt, had a much higher rate of attesting charters – 62 in three and a half years for Roger and 12 in nine months for Philip. Even Baldric, Robert's subordinate and holder of the office of Keeper of the Royal Seal, attested 17 charters during Stephen's reign. Various reasons have been put forward for why Robert attested at a lower rate than the earlier chancellors, including indifference to his office, deputising the duties to another clerk, or difficulty in following the itinerant court due to age. Robert's last secure appearance as chancellor as a witness to a charter is one dated to the summer of 1154 at Lincoln.

It is possible that Robert fell out with Stephen in the last months of the king's reign – Stephen died in October 1154. Stephen besieged Drax Castle in the summer of 1154, which had earlier been given to Robert's nephew, Robert. The younger Robert may have objected to giving up his castle to the previous owners, and the elder Robert may have taken offence at these events. This would explain why Robert does not appear on Stephen's charters after the Lincoln charter of 1154, but this theory is just speculation by one of Robert's biographers. Robert was replaced as chancellor by Becket shortly after Henry II's coronation on 19 December 1154 and before January 1155.

== Dean of York ==
Robert held the office of Dean of York from at least 1147, but may have occupied the office as early as 1142. He may have been still alive as late as 1157, as it is possible he was the addressee of a letter from the papacy in January 1157. His last secure attestation as dean is in October 1154. Although Keats-Rohan states in Domesday Descendants that Robert was also Archdeacon of York, he is not so listed in the Fasti Ecclesiae Anglicanae under any of the archdeaconries.

In 1147, William fitzHerbert, the Archbishop of York, was deposed, and a new election for the archbishopric was ordered by Pope Eugenius III on 11 May 1147. The election took place on 24 July 1147 at Richmond rather than York, due to the opposition of William of Aumale, the Earl of York, who supported the ousted archbishop. Robert, along with Hugh de Puiset and some of the cathedral chapter, favoured Hilary, a canon lawyer. Most of the rest of the archdiocese's officials and the chapter favoured Henry Murdac. The disputed election was decided by the pope, who declared Murdac the new archbishop and gave the vacant bishopric of Chichester to Hilary. Murdac was consecrated by Eugenius on 7 December 1147, and Robert appears to have supported the new archbishop, or at least not to have actively opposed him. But others among the cathedral chapter and suffragan bishops of York continued to actively agitate against Murdac, including refusing him entry to York for three years. Robert took little other part in the disputes at York during Murdac's archiepiscopate. Probably, it was Robert's involvement in secular office as chancellor that restricted his activities with his ecclesiastical office. Robert may have become a supporter of Murdac's during this time, as the archbishop addressed at least six confirmation grants to Robert.

William was re-elected to York after Murdac's death in 1153. When William attempted to enter York on 9 May 1154, Robert, along with Osbert de Bayeux, tried to prevent his entry, but their attempt was unsuccessful and they then went to Theobald of Bec, the Archbishop of Canterbury, and appealed in vain against William's actions. It is possible that Robert feared that William would remove Robert from the deanship. After William's death, Robert, once more acting with Osbert, pressured the cathedral chapter of York to elect Stephen's choice of Roger de Pont L'Évêque as the new Archbishop of York. Osbert was later accused of poisoning William, and was deprived of his office and clerical status when he could not clear himself from the accusation. Although Robert was associated with Osbert's opposition to William, there is no evidence that Robert was ever thought to have been involved in the possible poisoning of William.

== Death ==
The historian Katharine Keats-Rohan records his death as occurring in 1157 or 1158. Robert's successor as dean, Robert Butevilain, is first securely attested as dean on 6 May 1158, and the last secure date for his holding his previous office is 13 December 1157, which suggests that Robert of Ghent died in between those dates, or shortly before the earlier date.

== Citations ==
Political offices
Preceded by Philip de Harcourt	Lord Chancellor; 1140–1154	Succeeded by Thomas Becket
