= Prebendaries of Aylesbury =

Title in the Church of England

The prebendaries of Aylesbury can be traced back to Ralph in 1092. The prebend of Aylesbury was attached to the See of Lincoln as early as 1092. An early account states "It is said that a Bishop of Lincoln, desired by the Pope, give the Personage of Aylesbury to a stranger, a kinsman of his, found means to make it a Prebend, and to incorporate it to Lincoln Church." So in the reign of Edward III the church of St. Mary the Virgin, Aylesbury was part of the Deanery of Lincoln, and a separate stall in that Cathedral was set aside for the Dean.

Most prebends disappeared in 1547, when nearly all collegiate churches in England were dissolved by the Act for the Dissolution of Collegiate Churches and Chantries of that year, as part of the English Reformation. Aylesbury seems to have been an exception until 1842 when after the death of Dr. Pretyman an Honorary Canon was appointed in his stead.

== List of prebendaries of Aylesbury ==
Incumbent	Notes
Ranulph or Ralph	Dean of Lincoln 1092.
Simon Bloet	1110, supposedly died in exile.
Nigel	1123 to 1138.
Philip de Harcourt	1141
Adelelm, Adelmus, or Ascelinus	1145, he died in 1162.
Hamelinus	1164 (approximately), he was the founder of a Gilbertine Priory at Alvingham, Lincoln.
Geoffrey Kirtling	1169, although according to some sources, this may be 1176.
Richard FitzNeal	1184. In 1189 he was advanced to the See of London. He died in 1198.
Hamo	1189, died 1195.
Roger de Rolveston	1195, died 1223.
William de Thornaco	William was suspended in 1239.
Roger de Wesenham	Succeeded William de Tournay. Roger severed the Church of Aylesbury from the Deanery, having it erected as a separate dignity. Roger de Wenesham died in 1257, Bishop of Lichfield.
Robert de Mariscis	Also known as Robert Marsh. The first distinct Prebendary of Aylesbury. He was also Archdeacon of Oxford in 1248, and in 1259 succeeded Richard de Gravesen in the Deanery.
William de Shirewood	In 1259 he was Chancellor of the Church of Lincoln, and he was described, in a 1266 patent for the annexation of the chapels of Burton, Querendon, Stokes and Buckland to the Prebend of Aylesbury, as 'Master William de Shirewode, Rector of the Prebendal Church of Eylesbury'. In 1267 he was Treasurer of Lincoln, but had vacated the Prebend by this time.
John de Sharrested	Collated by Bishop Gravesend about 1265.
Percival de Lavinia	Held the Prebendary in 1285, and is probably the 'stranger' referred to by Leland, as he was the brother of Ottobon (who later became Pope), Legate from Pope Innocent. Percival was also Archdeacon of Buckingham in 1270, and he died Prebendary of Weighton, in York Cathedral in 1290.
Richard de Hederington	Collated July, 1290. Due to a complaint that the Vicarage had an insufficient endowment, Richard augmented it with two parts out of three of the tithes of the mills in the parish. During his time as Prebendary, Milton, in Oxfordshire was severed from the Prebend.
Richard de Havering	Chosen by the Archbishop of Dublin, he was known as 'Dublin Electus', and was installed in 1310.
Robert de Baldock	Became Pebendary, August 1320, and had been Archdeacon of Middlesex, in St. Pauls Cathedral from 1314. During the wars of Edward II he lost his ecclesiastical preferments, and in 1326 was imprisoned by the populace in Newgate, where he died, May 1327.
Robert de Stratford	Robert appears as Prebendary in 1329. He was also Rector of Stratford-on-Avon, Canon of Lincoln, and in 1381 Vicar-General of Winchester.
Simon de Islip	Collated 1329. In 1331 he was Archdeacon of Stow, by exchange for the Rectory of Eston and about 1337 exchanged the Aylesbury Prebend for Welton-Bicknell or Beckall. During his life he held many important positions including Prebendary of St. Pauls, Archdeacon of Canterbury, Dean of the Court of Arches, Secretary of State, Privy Councillor, Keeper of the Privy Seal, Archbishop of Avignon and Bishop of London. He died in 1366.
Edmund Bereford	Collated 1337 by exchange with Simon de Islip. He was Prebendary of Aylesbury in 1348.
William or Philip Beauchamp	Occurs in 1361
John Flive	Admitted November, 1371
Peter de Yeverino, or Vernhio	He was a Roman Cardinal by Papal provision, 1376. He held the Prebend of Aylesbury in 1378, and was also Archdeacon of Exeter.
Richard de Holland	Installed February 1389, and exchanged in 1395 with -
Thomas More	Became Prebendary by exchange in 1395, but quit it in the same year. He became Archdeacon of Colchester in St. Pauls 1398 and was promoted to the Deanery of Lincoln in 1406. He died December, 1421.
John Lincoln	Admitted July, 1395. He was Rector of Hadleigh in Suffolk, Provost or Dean of Caergroby College in Wales, and Prebendary of Sarum and Wells.
Thomas Walton, LL.B.	Collated October 1415.
Robert FitzHugh, A.M.	Collated August, 1419 after Thomas Walton's resignation. In 1419 he was also Archdeacon of Northampton, and was sent twice to Germany as Ambassador, and once to the Pope. In 1431 he was consecrated Bishop of London and in 1434 he attended the Council of Basil. He was elected Bishop of Ely, but unfortunately died suddenly January, 1435, before translation. He is buried in St. Paul's Cathedral.
Richard Cawdry	Prebendary circa 1431. Previously he was Prebendary of Bedford Major and Archdeacon of Bedford, in Lincoln Cathedral, from 1423. In 1431 he vacated the Aylesbury Prebend on collation to the Archdeaconry of Lincoln.
John Urrey	Collated October, 1431, died in 1434.
Thomas Chicheley	Kinsman of the Archbishop, Thomas was installed June, 1434. In February, 1432 he had been made Prebendary of Caddington-Minor in St. Paul's. In December, 1433 he was collated to the Archdeaconry of Canterbury. Thomas was also licensed by writ of Privy Seal to hold the office of Prothonotary to the Pope. He was Master of St. Thomas's Hospital, Canterbury and Provost of Wingham College, Kent. He died January, 1466.
John Forster	Collated 1438.
John Beverley	Occurs in 1448 and 1453. He resigned in 1458, being collated to the Prebend of Caistor. He died 1473.
William Ingram, LL.D.	Collated and installed January, 1463. In July, 1467, he resigned to be collated to the Archdeaconry of Oxford, and he died in 1472.
John Marshall, S.T.P.	Collated July, 1467. The following year he was promoted to the See of Llandaff. He died in 1459.
Ralph Scroope	Installed December, 1478. He was the Rector of Hambledon in 1489, and in February, 1493, Archdeacon of Northumberland. He died in 1516, and was buried at Hambledon.
Richard Maudeley, B.D.	Installed March, 1516. He had been Prebendary of Stow, which he left for Heyder-cum-Walton. In May, 1518, he was installed Archdeacon of Leicester. He was made Prebendary of Thame, and of All Saints, but he soon resigned the latter, but kept the rest of his preferments until his death. He was buried in Thame.
Thomas Swaine	Installed June, 1518. He had been successively Prebendary of Heydor, Corringham, and Stow. He was Chaplain to William Atwater, Bishop of Lincoln and was a Bachelor of Sacred Theology. He died 13 September 1519, at the Episcopal Palace at Wooburn, and was buried in Wooburn Church, where there is a brass to his memory in the chancel.
John Talbot, S.T.P. and M.D.	Collated 1519. Exchanged for the Sub-Deanery of Lincoln in which he was installed in July 1523, and resigned in 1535.
Brian Higden LL.D.	Collated June, 1523. In 1505 he had been presented by the Abbot and Convent of Oseney to the rectory of Bucknell, Oxon, having been educated at Broadgate Hall, Oxon. In 1511, he was installed Sub-Dean of Lincoln, but resigned to obtain the Prebendary of Aylesbury. He was Pebendary of Neasden, in St. Paul's, and admitted, May 1515, to the Archdeaconry of York and in June 1516, he advanced to the Deanery and Prebend of Ulleskelf, and made Vicar-General of York. He died June, 1539.
Henry Mallet, B.D.	Installed August, 1539, and held the Prebend in 1561. However, intermediately, at the Reformation, the Prebend of Aylesbury was conveyed, by the Bishop of Lincoln, to the Earl of Warwick.
John Chandler LL.B.	Installed April, 1578. John was also Rector of Great Horwood and Archdeacon of Worcester in 1610. He died August, 1623.
John Hackett B.D.	Installed December, 1623. He was born in the Strand, Middlesex and entered Westminster in 1608, and from there he went to Trinity College, Cambridge. In 1618, he was appointed Chaplain to Dr. Williams, Bishop of Lincoln. In 1623 he became Rector of St. Andrews, Holborn. He was made S.T.P., and October 1631, Archdeacon of Bedford, and, besides being Chaplain to King James, was prebendary of St. Paul's. During the Civil War he retired to Cheam, and continued to use the Liturgy in his Church there, till the Earl of Essex with his army, passing that way, made him prisoner. However, on release he continued to use the Liturgy, until the Surrey Committee persuaded him to omit the sections which most offended the Government. After the Restoration of Charles II, he was made Bishop of Lichfield, and was responsible for the rebuilding of the Cathedral. He died in October 1670, and is buried in the Cathedral.
Abraham Cole	Installed March, 1662. He was Rector of Offord-Cluny, Huntingdon, and died in 1664.
Thomas Laney, D.D.	Installed April, 1664. In November, 1667 he was made Precentor of Lincoln and in November, 1662, he became Pebendary in the sixth stall of Peterborough. He held both of these, together with the Prebend of Aylesbury, until his death in 1669.
Francis Drope, B.D.	Collated February 1669. Died September, 1671, and was buried at the Church in Cumner, Berkshire, where he was the Vicar.
John Hammond, A.M.	Installed May, 1672. Previously he had been Prebendary of Brampton, but resigned May,1670. In September, 1673 he was made Archdeacon of Huntingdon, and vacated Aylesbury Prebend. He went on to become Canon in the fourth stall at Christ Church, Oxon July 1679, and D.D. He was also the Rector of Chalfont St. Giles from 1701 until his death.
Walter Bronscombe or Bomesgrove	Installed May, 1673. Also, Rector of St. Peter's Arches in Lincoln, and was buried in the chancel there December, 1689.
George Williams	Installed February, 1689. Died November, 1723, and was buried at Kingston, near Cambridge, where he had also been Rector.
John Dudley, A.M.	Collated December, 1723 and installed July, 1724. He was of Jesus College, Cambridge, A.B. 1715, A.M. 1719. In 1729 he was Vicar of Watford, Northamptonshire and collated to the Vicarage of Aylesbury. He died in 1735.
Edmund Castle, B.D.	He was of Christ Church College, Cambridge, A.B. 1719, A.M. 1723, S.T.B. Com. Reg. 1728, and Adm. 1745. He was also a Chaplain in Ordinary to his Majesty, Rector of Barley, Herts, December, 1731, and Dean of Hereford March, 1748. He died at Bath in 1750, and was buried at Barley.
John Taylor LL.D.	Collated 1750. He was at St. John's College, Cambridge, A.B. 1724, A.M. 1728, Fellow of St. John's 1730, Librarian to the University of Cambridge 1732, Registrar S.T.B. 1738, LL.D. 1741. Chancellor of Lincoln, April, 1744, Rector of Lawford, Essex, 1751, Archdeacon of Bucks June, 1753, Canon Resident of St. Paul's July 1757, and Prebendary of Ealdland, Commissary of Lincoln and Stow, and also Prolocutor to the Lower House of Convocation, F.R. and A.S. S.T.P., 1760. In April, 1766 he was buried in St. Paul's Cathedral.
George Gordon, B.D.	Collated April, 1766, to the Prbend of Aylesbury and to the Archdeaconry of Bucks. he was Chaplain to Dr. Green, Bishop of Lincoln, and being made Precentor of that Cathedral in 1769, he resigned the Archdeaconry. He died in 1793.
John Pretyman, D.D.	He was the younger son of Robert Pretyman, Esq., of Lincoln, and brother of George Pretyman, D.D., successively Bishop of Lincoln and Winchester. He was of Pembroke College, Cambridge, A.B. 1778, A.M. 1781, D.D., Prebendary of Norwich and Biggleswade 1786, Rector of Shotley, Suffolk, Precentor and Archdeacon of Lincoln 1793, and died in 1817, having, upon being presented to the Vicarage of Chiswick, Middlesex, in 1809, resigned the Prebend of Aylesbury to his son.
John Pretyman, A.M.	Installed 1809, instituted 1811 to the Rectory of Sherrington, Buckinghamshire. In 1836 he was Official of the Archdeaconry of Lincoln. After the death of Dr. Pretyman, in 1842, an Honorary Canon, was appointed in his stead.
