= Roger de Rolleston =

Roman Catholic priest

- Dean of Lincoln
- See: Diocese of Lincoln
- Appointed: March 1195
- Predecessor: Hamo (Dean of Lincoln)
- Successor: William de Thornaco
- Other post: Archdeacon of Leicester Prebendary of Aylesbury

Personal details
- Died: 28 January 1223
- Denomination: Roman Catholic

Roger de Rolleston was a Priest in the Roman Catholic Church.

== Career ==
Between 1174 and 1184 it is believed that Roger was a clerk to Archbishop of Canterbury Richard of Dover. In or after 1186 he was given by Archbishop of Canterbury Baldwin of Forde into the service of Bishop of Lincoln Hugh of Avalon during which time he worked with Robert de Bedford who is recorded as vice Bishop to Hugh of Avalon.

He was Archdeacon of Leicester but in 1195 he became Dean of Lincoln and Prebendary of Aylesbury.

== Sources ==
- Lipscomb, George (1847). The history and antiquities of the county of Buckingham (1847).
- Collectanea topographica et genealogica. 1837.
- Fasti ecclesiae Anlicanae. Oxford, University press. 1854.
