= Robert de Mariscis =

- Dean of Lincoln
- See: Diocese of Lincoln
- Appointed: 1259/1260
- Term ended: 24 Aug 1262
- Predecessor: Richard of Gravesend
- Successor: William of Lexington
- Other posts: Canon, Archdeacon of Oxford, Prebendary of Aylesbury

Personal details
- Died: 24 August 1262
- Denomination: Catholic

Robert de Mariscis (Robert Marsh) was a Priest in the Roman Catholic Church.

== Career ==
Robert de Mariscis first appears in April 1242 as an "official" (most likely a canon) of the Archdeacon of Wells

Robert is recorded as a "Bishop Robert Grosseteste's official" from around June 1243/1244 to the 24 July 1253 or later. Between 1245 and 1250 he is shown as vicar-general during the aforementioned Bishop's absences

He is shown as a Canon on the 13 October 1244 at Lincoln and Prebendary of Aylesbury on the resignation of Roger de Wesenham from the deanery in 1245.

He is shown as Archdeacon of Oxford from 1254 during which time, specifically 5 Jan 1258, he is still shown as Prebendary of Aylesbury but also Prebendary of Wells and vicar of Hemingbury.

He is then Dean of Lincoln on 9 July 1259 until his death in 1262.
