= Drope (disambiguation) =

Drope is a hamlet.

Drope may also refer to:

- Earle Drope (1898–1969), Canadian Politician
- Francis Drope (1629–1671), English arboriculturist
- Thomas Drope
- Drope v. Missouri, a 1975 US Supreme Court case
