= John Lexington =

English baron and royal official (1200–1257)

Sir John Lexington (or Lexinton or Lessington; also de Lexington) (died 1257) was a baron and royal official in 13th century England. He has been described as having been Lord Chancellor, but other scholars believe he merely held the royal seals while the office was vacant or the chancellor was abroad. He served two terms, once from 1247 to 1248, and again from 1249 to 1250.

== Life ==
Lexington was a member of a prominent family whose name came from the village of Lexington, now Laxton, in Nottinghamshire. His father Richard was a royal judge and married Mathilda de Cauz (or Calz), a widow with holdings that included Sherwood Forest. His youngest brother was Robert of Lexinton, a judge and royal official; another brother, Henry of Lexington, held royal offices before becoming Dean of Lincoln and then Bishop of Lincoln. A fourth brother, Stephen of Lexington, became a Cistercian monk and administrator, ultimately serving as Abbot of Clairvaux.

John Lexington was sent by Henry III to a proposed papal conference in 1241 and was present at a naval battle near the Isola del Giglio in which Pisan and Sicilian ships defeated the Genoese and a number of prelates were captured; he helped save the life of his brother Stephen, who was present. On his return he was part of the expedition against Dafydd ap Llywelyn of Wales and conveyed the hostage Gruffydd ap Llywelyn Fawr, Dafydd's half-brother, to London. In 1242 he was appointed to a truce commission to correct infringements of the truce with France. He served as the king's seneschal in 1247 and possibly at other times. After 1248 there is evidence that he served as a judge. In 1250, he inherited the barony and lands of his brother Robert. By 1255 he was serving as chief justice of the forests north of the Trent, and warden of Bamburgh, Pickering, and Scarborough castles.

In response to the death of Little Saint Hugh of Lincoln, he imprisoned a Jew named Copin or Jopin and obtained a confession in return for a promise to save his life (a promise the king repudiated). Given Lexington's personal relationship with the Bishop and other clerics in Lincoln, there is considerable suspicion that he pushed King Henry towards dealing with the Jews severely, and with the knowledge that the accusations had no basis in fact. Langmuir says of Lexington:

what he did powerfully affected those predisposed to think evil of Jews then and for centuries to come. He incited the weakly credulous Henry III to give the ritual murder fantasy the blessing of royal authority, and he inspired Matthew Paris to write a vivid garbled yarn that would ring in men's minds for centuries and blind modern historians. A century and a half later, Geoffrey Chaucer, after letting the legend of the singing boy slip from the prioress' lips, would inevitably be reminded of England's most famous proof of Jewish evil and conclude with an invocation to young Hugh — whose alleged fate neither he nor his audience were likely to question. John de Lexington died in January, 1257, and his elegant learning will not be described in any history of mediaeval thought, yet his tale of young Hugh of Lincoln became a strand in English literature and a support for irrational beliefs about Jews from 1255 to Auschwitz. It is time he received his due credit.

Matthew Paris called him a man of weight and learning and a brave and accomplished knight. His arms were a cross azure on a shield argent. He married a woman named Margaret (or Margery) de Merlay, daughter of Richard d'Umfraville of Prudhoe and widow of Roger de Merlay, Baron Morpeth. They had no children.

His estate went to his brother Henry, the bishop of Lincoln, and on his death in 1258 to the descendants of their two sisters, Alice and Cecilia, wives of Roland de Sutton and William Markham, since none of his brothers left heirs.

== See also ==
- List of lord chancellors and lord keepers

== Notes ==
Political offices
Preceded by John Maunsell	Lord Chancellor; 1247–1248	Succeeded by John Maunsell
Preceded by John Maunsell	Lord Chancellor; 1249–1250	Succeeded by William of Kilkenny
