= George Heneage (priest) =

English churchman

- Dean of Lincoln
- Church: Church of England
- See: Diocese of Lincoln
- In office: 1528–1538
- Predecessor: John Constable
- Successor: John Taylor

Personal details
- Born: 1482/3
- Died: 1549

George Heneage (1482/3 – 1549) was an English churchman who became Dean of Lincoln.

== Life ==
He was the second son of John Heneage of Hainton, near Wragby, Lincolnshire, and uncle to Thomas Heneage. He graduated LL.B. at Cambridge in 1510, and was incorporated at Oxford in 1522.

He was chaplain to Thomas Wolsey and to John Longland, bishop of Lincoln, holding prebends in Lincoln, Salisbury, and York Cathedrals. He became treasurer of Lincoln in 1521, archdeacon of Oxford from 1522 to 1528, dean of Lincoln in 1528, and archdeacon of Taunton in 1533. He was rector of Sutton Coldfield, Warwickshire, and custos of Tattershall College in 1534 (which he later surrendered to the Crown), and archdeacon of Lincoln in 1542. He resigned the deanery of Lincoln for a pension before 1544, but remained archdeacon of Lincoln until his death, about September 1549. He was buried in Lincoln Cathedral.
