= Bloet =

Bloet is a surname. Notable people with the surname include:

- Nest Bloet (died 1224/25), Welsh noblewoman
- Robert Bloet (died 1123), English bishop and chancellor
- Simon Bloet (before 1093–after 1129), English priest
