= Roger le Poer =

12th-century Chancellor of England

Lord Chancellor
- In office 1135 – June 1139
- Preceded by: Robert de Sigello
- Succeeded by: Philip de Harcourt

Personal details
- Born: likely after 1107
- Died: after 1139
- Relations: Roger of Salisbury – father Matilda of Ramsbury – mother

Roger le Poer (Note: Sometimes Roger Pauper or Roger Poer) was a medieval Lord Chancellor from 1135 until 1139 for King Stephen of England. The son of a powerful bishop, Roger owed his position to his family connections. He lost his office when his father and other relatives lost power. Arrested along with his father, Roger was used to secure the surrender of a castle held by his mother and then disappeared from history.

== Background and early life ==
Roger was the son of Roger of Salisbury, Lord Chancellor for King Henry I of England and Bishop of Salisbury, (Note: The chronicler William of Malmesbury calls him the nepos, or "nephew", of Roger of Salisbury, but this is a euphemism used to describe the sons of clerics in the Middle Ages. William's description of Roger was that he was "a nephew or perhaps even a closer relation" of the elder Roger.) and Matilda of Ramsbury. It is possible that Roger of Salisbury was married to Matilda prior to his elevation to the episcopate, but this is unlikely. Because their son Roger le Poer was described as "young" in 1139, it is most likely that he was born after his father's consecration as bishop in 1107. A biographer of Roger of Salisbury, Edward Kealey, has argued that Roger le Poer is the same person as Roger, the archdeacon of Berkshire who died in the 1160s. Another possibility, that the younger Roger was the same as Roger of Ramsbury, archdeacon of Wiltshire, is less likely, as it is known that Roger of Ramsbury was not closely related to Adelelm, the nephew or son of Roger of Salisbury. The historian Diana Greenway in the Fasti Ecclesiae Anglicanae 1066–1300 takes this view.

== Chancellor ==
The younger Roger's family was a powerful one in England – not only was his father the Bishop of Salisbury, but he also held the administration of the government in his hands. The older Roger had the powers of the office of justiciar, without having been appointed to that office, as a continuation of the power he had held during the second part of the reign of Henry I. The elder Roger's two nephews – Nigel, who was Bishop of Ely and had previously been Lord Treasurer, and Alexander, who was Bishop of Lincoln – both held important bishoprics, and another nephew or son held the Treasurership from 1136. This was Adelelm, who may have been a full brother to Roger le Poer. The family also controlled a number of castles throughout England. William of Malmesbury, a medieval chronicler, claimed that the younger Roger's appointment as chancellor was the price demanded by the elder Roger for the bishop's support of Stephen as king after the death of King Henry I. Roger served as chancellor from 1135 until 24 June 1139.

Roger travelled with the king, often accompanying him in the royal progresses around England. In late 1136 or 1137, Roger was with the king at a court called at Westminster which heard a complaint by the Holy Trinity Priory in London that Hasculf de Tany, the castellan of the Tower of London, had taken land that belonged to the priory. In the end, the priory regained custody of their land. In March 1137 Roger was with the king right before the king sailed to Normandy, as the chancellor witnessed a charter of the king just prior to his departure. As chancellor, Roger was a witness on over 60 royal writs.

== Arrest and exile ==
In the middle of 1139, rumours were current that the family was going to defect to Stephen's rival for the throne, the Empress Matilda. These rumours appear to have been started by a group of nobles led by twin brothers Waleran de Beaumont, the Count of Meulan, and Robert de Beaumont, the Earl of Leicester, with Alan of Brittany. Whether Roger and his family really intended to switch their support to Matilda is unclear, but unlikely. In late June, a fight broke out between some of the retainers of Alan and men in the service of Roger's family. This fight was the excuse for the king moving against Roger's family. Both the elder and younger Roger were arrested, along with Alexander, but Nigel escaped. Matilda of Ramsbury, who held out in Devizes Castle against the king, was persuaded to surrender the castle to Stephen when the king threatened to hang the younger Roger, Matilda's own son, if she did not yield. The younger Roger was restrained with chains and put on a high platform in view of the castle with a noose around his neck.

The name le poer, or pauperus, means "pauper" and was not given to Roger until after his and his father's fall from power in 1139. It is possible the new name was bestowed because he could have expected to receive a bishopric after his time as chancellor, which did not happen because of his family's disgrace. Another possible reason for the name was to contrast with his father's wealth. It is unlikely that he was actually poor, as his family was wealthy and powerful. (Note: Some later historians applied the same name to his father, but this is not a contemporary attestation.) The historian Francis West described the base of the family's power as "control of the important offices of royal government".

Roger was sent into exile after his family's disgrace. If he is the same person as the archdeacon of Berkshire, he died in the middle of the 1160s, but no other sure information is known about him after his exile.

== Citations ==
Political offices
Preceded by Robert de Sigello (Keeper of the Great Seal)	Lord Chancellor; 1135–1139	Succeeded by Philip de Harcourt
