= Samuel Fuller (disambiguation) =

Samuel Fuller (1912–1997) was an American screenwriter and film director

Samuel Fuller may also refer to:

- Samuel Fuller (Pilgrim) (1580–1633), English doctor and church deacon
- Samuel Augustus Fuller (1837–1891), American steel industry executive
- Samuel B. Fuller (1905–1988), American entrepreneur
- Samuel Fuller (priest) (1635–1700), dean of Lincoln
