= Medburn =

Medburn may refer to:

- Peter de Medburn (fl. 1294), English medieval jurist and university chancellor
- Medburn, Northumberland, village in Ponteland civil parish, England
