= Hugh III =

Hugh III may refer to:

- Hugh III of Lusignan (fl. late 10th century)
- Hugh III of Maine (c. 960–c. 1015)
- Hugh III, Viscount of Châteaudun (died 1044)
- Hugh III de Montfort (died 1123 or after)
- Hugh III of Le Puiset (died 1132)
- Hugh III, Count of Saint-Pol (died 1141)
- Hugh III of Rodez (died 1136)
- Hugh III of Broyes (c. 1120–c. 1199)
- Hugh III, Duke of Burgundy (1142–1192)
- Hugh III of Angoulême (c. 1235/40–1270), a.k.a. Hugh XII of Lusignan
- Hugh III of Cyprus (c. 1235–1284), King of Jerusalem
- Hugh III of Arborea (died 1383)
