= Henry of Bath =

English judge and administrator

4th Lord Chief Justice of England
- In office 1249–1251
- Monarch: Henry III
- Chancellor: Sir John Lexington (1249-1250); William of Kilkenny (1250-1251) (as Lord Keepers of the Great Seal)
- Preceded by: William of York
- Succeeded by: Sir Gilbert of Seagrave

6th Lord Chief Justice of England
- In office 1253–1260
- Monarch: Henry III
- Prime Minister: Hugh Bigod (1258-1260) (as Chief Justiciar)
- Chancellor: William of Kilkenny (1253-1255) (as Lord Keeper of the Great Seal); Henry Wingham
- Preceded by: Sir Gilbert of Seagrave
- Succeeded by: Sir William of Wilton

7th Chief Justice of the Common Pleas
- In office 1245–1249
- Monarch: Henry III
- Chancellor: Silvester de Everdon (1245-1246); John Maunsell (1246-1246, 1248-1249); Sir John Lexington (1247-1248) (as Lord Keepers of the Great Seal)
- Preceded by: Robert of Lexinton
- Succeeded by: Roger of Thirkleby

9th Chief Justice of the Common Pleas
- In office 1256–1258
- Monarch: Henry III
- Prime Minister: Hugh Bigod (1258) (as Chief Justiciar)
- Chancellor: Henry Wingham
- Preceded by: Roger of Thirkleby
- Succeeded by: Roger of Thirkleby

24th High Sheriff of Gloucestershire
- In office 1232–1234
- Monarch: Henry III
- Prime Minister: Stephen de Segrave (as Chief Justiciar)
- Chancellor: Ralph Neville
- Preceded by: William Putot
- Succeeded by: William Talbot

31st High Sheriff of Northamptonshire
- In office 1235–1239 Serving with Peter de Maulay
- Monarch: Henry III
- Chancellor: Ralph Neville
- Preceded by: Stephen de Segne; William de Maravast
- Succeeded by: William de Coleworth

5th High Sheriff of Sussex and Surrey
- In office 1235–1236 Serving with Simon de Echingham and Joel de Sancto Germano
- Monarch: Henry III
- Chancellor: Ralph Neville
- Preceded by: Simon de Echingham; Joel de Sancto Germano
- Succeeded by: John de Gatesden; Philip de Crofts

43rd High Sheriff of Yorkshire
- In office 1242–1246
- Monarch: Henry III
- Chancellor: Ralph Neville (1242-1244); Silvester de Everdon (1244-1246) (as Lord Keeper of the Great Seal)
- Preceded by: Nicholas de Moels
- Succeeded by: Adam de Neirford

Personal details
- Born: Unknown
- Died: ca. 1260

Henry de Bada (or Henry de Bathonia; died November 1260) was an English judge and administrator.

== Career ==
He began his career under his relative Hugh of Bath, who died in 1236, leaving his chattels to Henry. Henry started his administrative career as a bailiff for the Honour of Berkhamsted in 1221, succeeding Hugh as Under-Sheriff of Berkshire from 1228 to 1229. This is the last record of his career under Hugh; from then on he was entirely independent. From 1229 to 1232 he served as Under-Sheriff for Hampshire and as High Sheriff of Gloucestershire from 1232 to 1234, a time when the county was the main base for the Marcher Wars of 1233–34. He served as High Sheriff as an agent of Peter de Rivaux, and as such required a pardon after Peter's fall from grace in 1234, Peter and his close associates having been declared traitors.

Immediately after the pardon, however, he became High Sheriff of Northamptonshire, and remained in that position until 1240 except for a two-month period as both High Sheriff of Surrey and that of Sussex in 1236. In 1238 he became a junior justice of the bench in Westminster, continuing to administer Northamptonshire through deputies. Between 1240 and 1241 he worked on the Eyre Circuit for William of York as the second most senior justice, holding an Eyre in Hampshire in 1241 in which he was the senior judge.

In 1241 he went on a mission to Ireland, and on his return served for two terms as a justice coram Rege (in the presence of the King) until 1242. After Henry III left for his trip to Gascony in 1242 he was appointed High Sheriff of Yorkshire, a position he held until 1248 (although it was administered by his deputies from 1245 onwards). In 1245 he became Chief Justice of the Court of Common Pleas. From 1247 to 1249 he acted as the senior justice for an Eyre circuit, during which period the Court of Common Pleas did not sit. In 1249 he was again promoted, leaving his position of Chief Justice, and received a salary of over £100 a year. Between 1250 and 1251 he was senior justice for another Eyre circuit, at which point he was accused of deliberately perverting the course of justice, for which his judicial position was taken, he was stripped of his position as Keeper of Gloucester Castle and he was fined the huge amount of 2000 marks (£1333 6s 8d), part of which was still unpaid when he died.

Henry came back into royal favour in 1253, shortly before another of the king's journeys to Gascony, and was made Chief Justice of the Common Pleas yet again in 1256, serving until 1258. He died in November 1260.

Legal offices
| Preceded by William of York | Lord Chief Justice of England; 1253-1260 | Succeeded by Sir Gilbert of Seagrave |
| Preceded by Sir Gilbert of Seagrave | Lord Chief Justice of England; 1253-1260 | Succeeded by Sir William of Wilton |
| Preceded by Robert of Lexinton | Chief Justice of the Common Pleas; 1245–1249 | Succeeded by Roger of Thirkleby |
| Preceded by Roger of Thirkleby | Chief Justice of the Common Pleas; 1256–1258 | Succeeded by Roger of Thirkleby |
Honorary titles
| Preceded by William Putot | High Sheriff of Gloucestershire; 1232–1234 | Succeeded by William Talbot |
| Preceded by Stephen de Segne; William de Maravast | High Sheriff of Northamptonshire jointly with Peter de Maulay; 1235-1239 | Succeeded by William de Coleworth |
| Preceded by Simon de Echingham; Joel de Sancto Germano | High Sheriff of Sussex and Surrey jointly with Simon de Echingham and Joel de Sancto Germano; 1235-1236 | Succeeded by John de Gatesden; Philip de Crofts |
| Preceded by Nicholas de Moels | High Sheriff of Yorkshire; 1242–1246 | Succeeded by Adam de Neirford |
