= Bardney Abbey =

British Benedictine abbey in Lincolnshire

Coordinates: 53.2204°N 0.3336°W

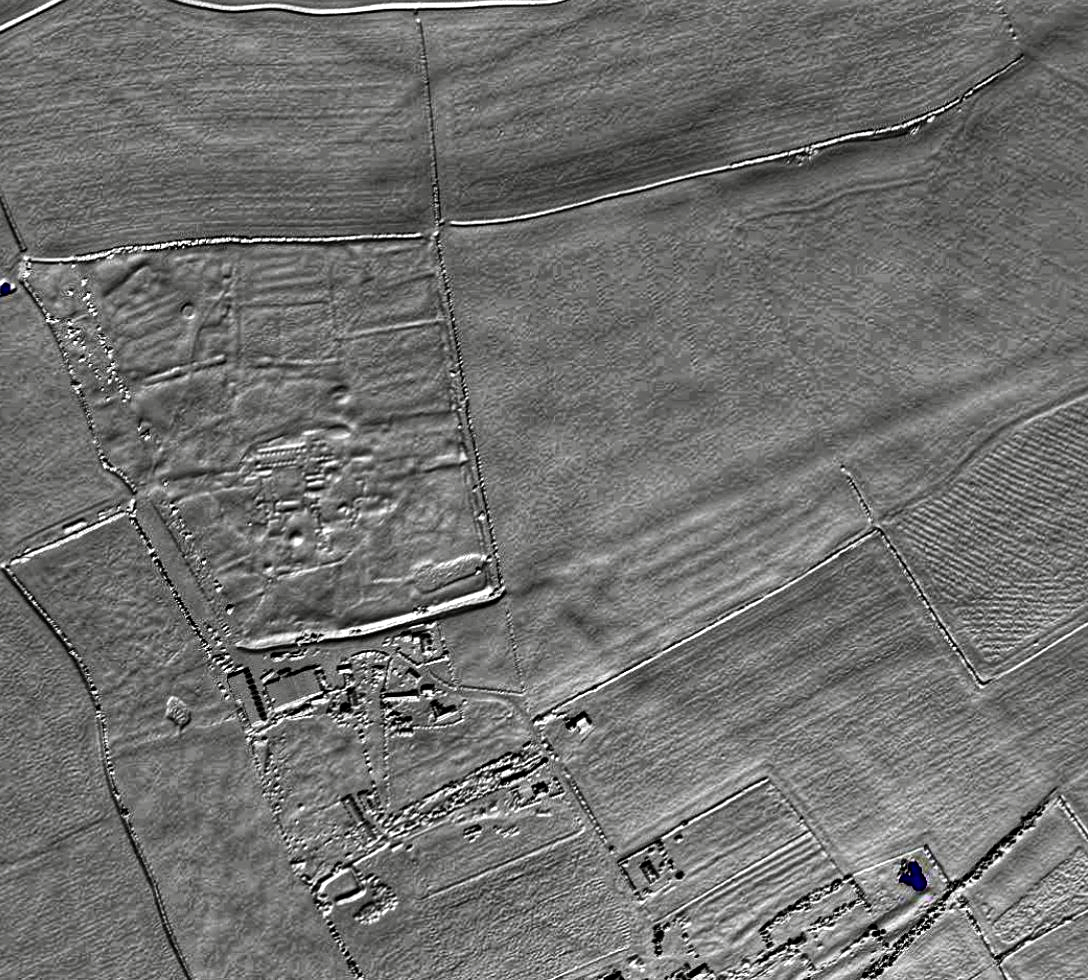
A vertical lidar view of the site of Bardney Abbey

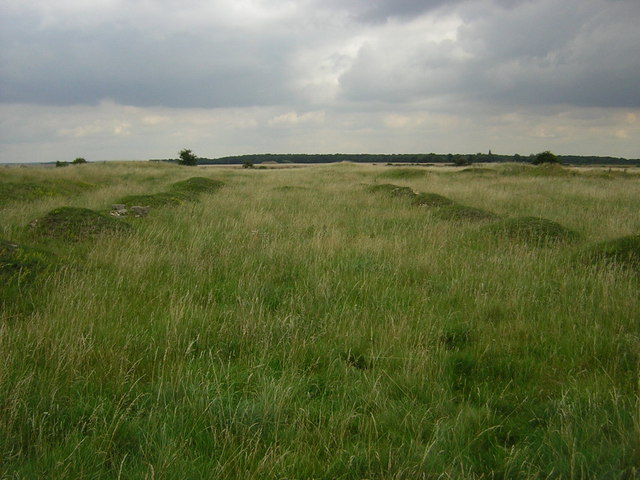
The nave of the abbey church

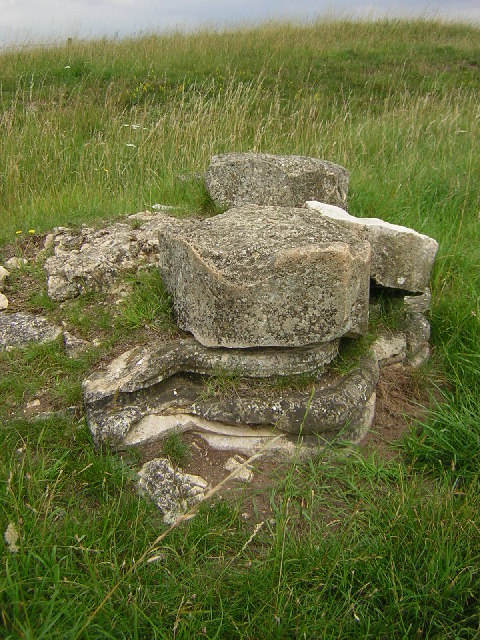
Surviving pillar base

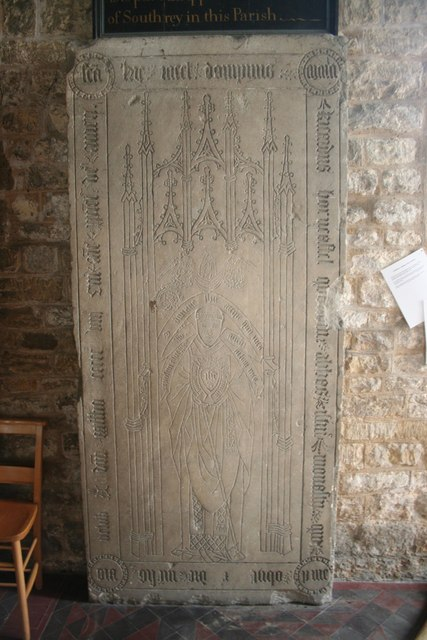
Gravestone of former abbot Richard Horncastle, in the nearby church of St Lawrence, Bardney

Bardney Abbey in Lincolnshire, England, was a Benedictine monastery founded in 697 by King Æthelred of Mercia, who was to become the first abbot. The monastery was supposedly destroyed during a Danish raid in 869. In 1087, the site was refounded as a priory, by Gilbert de Gant, Earl of Lincoln, and it regained status as an abbey in 1115.

In 1537, six of the Bardney Abbey monks were executed for their role in the Lincolnshire Rising. In 1538, the Abbey was disbanded and its property seized during the Dissolution of the Monasteries campaign started by Henry VIII. The property was then granted to Sir Robert Tirwhit.

Tirwhit retained the abbot's lodging as a house and converted the cloister into a garden. In later years, the lodging and garden became ruins along with the remainder of the former abbey.

Excavations from 1909 through 1914 revealed the layout of Bardney Abbey. This can still be seen, though nothing remains to any height. Further excavations and conservation took place in 2009 and 2011. Some grave slabs and carved stones are preserved in Bardney parish church, which is dedicated to St Lawrence. The abbey site is now owned by the charity the Society for Lincolnshire History and Archaeology.

== Relics of St Oswald ==
Bede relates that Bardney Abbey (which he called Beardaneu) was greatly loved by Osthryth, queen of Mercia, and in about 679 she sought to move the bones of her uncle, the very pious St Oswald, to there. However, when the body was brought to the Abbey the monks refused to accept it, because the Abbey was in the Kingdom of Lindsey, and Oswald, when king of Northumbria, had once conquered them. The relics were locked outside, but during the night a beam of light appeared and shone from his bier reaching up into the heavens. The monks declared that it was a miracle and accepted the body, hanging the King's Purple and Gold banner over the tomb. They are also said to have removed the great doors to the Abbey so that such a mistake could not occur again. So if someone said "do you come from Bardney?", it meant that you had left the door open.

As well as the wondrous light, other miracles were associated with the remains of King Oswald. The bones at Bardney were washed before interment and ground into which the water was poured supposedly gained great healing powers. In another tale from Bede, a boy with the Ague kept vigil by the tomb and was cured. The King's heads and hands had been separately interred, for he had been dismembered in battle. A fragment of the stake on which his head had been impaled was later used to cure a man in Ireland.

In 909, in response to increased Viking raids, Oswald's bones were translated to the new St Oswald's Priory, Gloucester.

== Burials ==
- Oswald of Northumbria
- Æthelred of Mercia
- Osthryth
- Gilbert de Gant
- Alice de Montfort-sur-Risle, wife of Gilbert de Gant
- Walter de Gant, father of Gilbert de Gant, Earl of Lincoln
- Maud of Brittany (daughter of Stephen, Count of Tréguier), wife of Walter de Gaunt
- Alice de Gant, d. c. 1181 (daughter of Walter de Gant), wife of Roger de Mowbray (Lord of Montbray)

== Known abbots of Bardney ==
This list is taken from the Victoria County History, and Bowyer's History of the Mitred Parliamentary Abbies.

Original foundation:

- St. Ethelred, ex-king of Mercia, and founder of the abbey, made abbot about 704, died 716
- Kenewin, occurs 833

Benedictine foundation:

- Ralf, prior in 1087, abbot 1115
- Ivo, occurs about 1133
- John of Ghent, elected 1140, occurs 1147 and 1150
- Walter, occurs 1155 to 1166
- John, occurs 1167
- Ralf of Stainfield, occurs 1180
- Robert, occurs 1191
- Ralf de Rand, occurs 1208, deposed 1214
- Peter of Lenton, intruded 1214
- Matthew, occurs 1218, died 1223
- Adam de Ascwardby, elected 1225, occurs 1231 and 1240
- William of Ripton
- Walter of Benningworth, elected 1241, deposed 1243
- William of Hatton, elected 1244
- William of Torksey, elected 1258, died 1266
- Peter of Barton, elected 1266, resigned 1280
- Robert of Wainfleet, elected 1280, resigned 1318
- Richard of Gainsborough, elected 1318, died 1342
- Roger of Barrow, elected 1342, died 1355
- Thomas of Stapleton, elected 1355, died 1379
- Hugh of Braunston, elected 1379, resigned 1385
- John of Haynton, elected 1385
- John Woxbrigge, elected 1404, died 1413
- Geoffrey Hemingsby, elected 1413, died 1435
- John Wainfleet, elected 1435, died 1447
- Gilbert Multon, elected 1447, resigned 1466
- Richard Horncastle, elected 1466, resigned 1507
- William Marton, last abbot, elected 1507

== In popular culture ==
Bardney was referred to as Bearddan Igge (Bardney Abbey) in The Saxon Stories by Bernard Cornwell.

== See also ==
- Jews' Court, Lincoln
- List of monastic houses in Lincolnshire
