= Weseham =

Weseham is a surname. Notable people with the surname include:

- Roger Weseham (died 1257), English medieval academic and bishop
- Roger de Weseham (Oxford), English medieval archdeacon and university chancellor
