= Henry of Lexington =

13th-century Bishop of Lincoln

- Bishop of Lincoln
- Elected: December 1253
- Term ended: 8 August 1258
- Predecessor: Robert Grosseteste
- Successor: Richard of Gravesend
- Other post: Dean of Lincoln

Orders
- Consecration: 17 May 1254

Personal details
- Died: 8 August 1258 Nettleham, Lincolnshire
- Denomination: Catholic

Henry of Lexington (or Henry Lexington; died 1258) was a medieval Bishop of Lincoln.

== Life ==
Henry held the prebend of Calne in the diocese of Salisbury before becoming treasurer of Salisbury by 13 January 1239. By January 1246 he was Dean of Lincoln. His father Richard had been a royal judge. Henry's brother Robert of Lexinton was also a judge, and his brother John was a knight and clerk of the royal household, at various times seneschal, envoy, and keeper of the seals. Another brother was Stephen of Lexington, a Cistercian monk and abbot of Clairvaux abbey.

Henry was elected to the see of Lincoln on either 21 or 30 December 1253 and consecrated on 17 May 1254, at London or possibly at Lambeth.

Henry died on 8 August 1258 at Nettleham near Lincoln.

Henry's nephew was Oliver Sutton, the Bishop of Lincoln from 1280 to 1299.

== Citations ==
Catholic Church titles
| Preceded by Robert Grosseteste | Bishop of Lincoln; 1253–1258 | Succeeded by Richard of Gravesend |
