= Walter de Gant =

English noble

Walter de Gant (died 1139), Lord of Folkingham was an English nobleman.

Walter was a son of Gilbert de Gant and Alice, Dame de Montfort-sur-Risle. He inherited the English titles of his father, while his older brother Hugh adopted his mother’s surname and arms to inherit her Norman titles and lands.

He founded the priory at Bridlington, around 1113 for Augustinian Canons. He died in 1139, while as a monk at Bardney Abbey and was buried there.

== Marriage and issue ==
Walter married Maud, daughter of Stephen, Count of Tréguier, they had the following issue:

- Gilbert de Gant, Earl of Lincoln, married Rohese de Clare, had issue.
- Robert de Gant, married firstly Alice Paynel, with issue, and secondly Gunnor d’Aubigny, with issue.
- Baldwin de Gant
- Geoffrey de Gant
