= Edmund Castle =

English priest and academic (1698–1750)

Edmund Castle (1698–1750) was an English churchman and academic, Master of Corpus Christi College, Cambridge from 1745, and Dean of Hereford in 1749.

== Life ==
Castle was born on 14 September 1698 near Canterbury in Kent, where he received the most of his early education. He was admitted to Corpus Christi College, Cambridge, in 1716, graduating B.A. in 1719, and being made a Fellow in 1722.

Castle was appointed Public Orator for the University of Cambridge in 1727; he gave up the office in 1729, on being appointed to the vicarages of Elm and Emneth. He was then moved to Barley, Hertfordshire. In 1744 he was made rector of St Paul's School, London, in 1745 master of Corpus Christi College, and in 1746 vice-chancellor. In 1747 he was promoted to the Prebendary of Aylesbury at Lincoln Cathedral, and in 1749 to the deanery of Hereford.

Castle died at Bath on 6 June 1750. He was buried at Barley, Hertfordshire, where there was a Latin inscription to his memory.

== Notes ==
Attribution

This article incorporates text from a publication now in the public domain: Stephen, Leslie, ed. (1887). "Castle, Edmund". Dictionary of National Biography. Vol. 9. London: Smith, Elder & Co.
