= Robert Mitchell (priest) =

Robert Andrew Mitchell was Dean of Lincoln from 1930 to 1949. Born in 1870, he was educated at Magdalen College, Oxford, and ordained in 1893. His first post was as a curate at St Mary-at-the-Walls, Colchester, after which he was Vicar of Highfield, Hampshire then of St. Michael's Church, Chester Square, before his appointment to the Deanery.

== Notes ==
Church of England titles
Preceded by Thomas Charles Fry	Dean of Lincoln; 1930 – 1949	Succeeded by David Colin Dunlop
