= William de Thornaco =

13th century English priest

- Dean of Lincoln
- See: Diocese of Lincoln
- Predecessor: Roger de Rolveston
- Successor: Roger de Weseham
- Other posts: Archdeacon of Stow, Archdeacon of Lincoln, Prebendary of Aylesbury

Personal details
- Died: 25 June 1258
- Denomination: Catholic

William de Thornaco was a Priest in the Roman Catholic Church.

== Career ==
He was Archdeacon of Stow, first in or around 27 February 1214 followed by Archdeacon of Lincoln in which office he appears by 22 May 1219.

He was a Dean of Lincoln and a Prebendary of Aylesbury between 28 January and 12 March 1223. He is recorded however as being suspended by Bishop Robert Grosseteste in 1239, together with precentor and subdean.

Bishop Robert Grosseteste had instituted a program of visitation, a procedure normally reserved for the inspection of monasteries. Grosseteste expanded this however to include all the deaneries in each archdeaconry of his vast diocese. This scheme brought him into conflict the aforementioned people who vigorously disputed his claim to exercise the right of visitation. The dispute raged hotly from 1239 to 1245, with the chapter launching an appeal to the papacy. In 1245, while attending the First Council of Lyons, the papal court ruled in favour of Grosseteste.

He was deprived or resigned office and sometime around 1239/40 William appears to have become a monk at Louth Park Abbey, a Cistercian abbey in Lincolnshire, England.
