= Roger of Thirkleby =

English judge

Roger of Thirkleby (died 1260) was an English judge. The "Thirkleby" of his name was a hamlet in the parish of Kirby Grindalythe, Yorkshire. The first record of his work in the judicial system is in 1230, when he was appointed a clerk of the bench. By the end of 1231 he was a clerk for William de Raley. He remained a clerk until 1242, when he was promoted to justice. He acted as a Puisne Justice until 1249, although he spent large amounts of time on Eyre, serving as chief justice on three eyres in the south-west in 1243 and 1244. Between 1245 and 1252 he and Henry of Bath served as senior Eyre justices, leading Eyre circuits on the brief circuit of 1245, the major country-wide visitation of 1246 to 1249, and a brief circuit of 1251 to 1252, before withdrawing from Eyres to concentrate on work at the bench. In 1249 he was appointed Chief Justice of the Common Pleas in succession to Henry of Bath, a position he held until 1256 when he himself was replaced by Henry. He returned to the job in 1258, serving until his death in 1260.

He took part in 51 Eyres, in 38 as chief justice. Many of his eyre rolls have survived, including thirteen from the Eyres of 1246 to 1249, the largest number of rolls to survive from that period of time.

Legal offices
Preceded by Henry of Bath	Chief Justice of the Common Pleas; 1249–1256	Succeeded by Henry of Bath
Preceded by Henry of Bath	Chief Justice of the Common Pleas; 1258–1260	Succeeded by Sir Gilbert of Preston
