= William Richardson (antiquary) =

English academic and antiquary

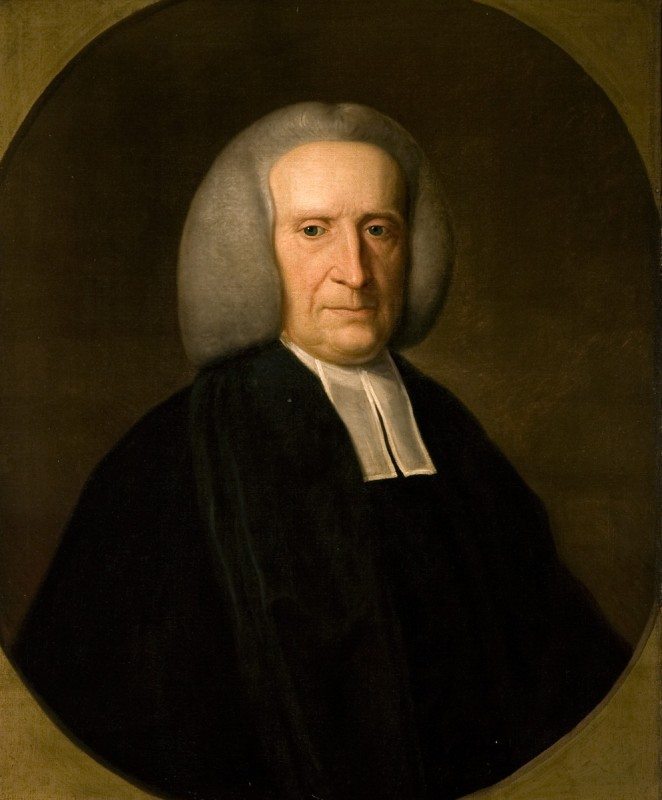
William Richardson by Joseph Freeman

William Richardson FSA (1698–1775) was an English academic and antiquary, Master of Emmanuel College, Cambridge from 1736.

== Life ==
Born at Wilshamstead, on 23 July 1698, he was son of Samuel Richardson, vicar of Wilshamstead, near Bedford, by his wife Elizabeth, daughter of Samuel Bentham, rector of Knebworth and Paul's Walden, both in Hertfordshire. He was educated at Oakham and Westminster School, and was admitted on 19 March 1716 as a pensioner at Emmanuel College, Cambridge, where he was elected scholar. In 1720 he was a Johnson exhibitioner. He graduated B.A. in 1719, M.A. in 1723, and D.D. in 1735.

Richardson was ordained deacon in September 1720, and priest in September 1722. On the resignation of his father he was appointed prebendary of Welton Rivall in Lincoln Cathedral on 19 October 1724, and held that prebend until 1760. He acted as curate at St. Olave's, Southwark, until 1726, when he was elected lecturer there.

Richardson was elected a Fellow of the Society of Antiquaries on 19 June 1735; William Stukeley noted he had a good coin collection. He was a Tory in politics; and his residence at Cambridge for his research led to his election as Master of his college. On 10 August 1736 he was unanimously, and without his knowledge, chosen Master of Emmanuel College, although he had never been a Fellow. In 1737 and in 1769 (on this occasion after a contest with Roger Long) he was elected vice-chancellor of the university, and from 1746 to 1768, when he resigned the post, he was one of the king's chaplains.

Richardson died at Emmanuel College, Cambridge, on 15 March 1775, after a lingering decay, and was buried in the college chapel by the side of his wife, who had died on 21 March 1759. A portrait of him was made in Cambridge, depicted in old age, somewhat stern, seated with a pen in his hand.

== Archbishop Potter's will ==
Archbishop John Potter, in his will, dated 12 August 1745, left his executors all his options in ecclesiastical preferments, but asked them to have regard in the distribution to Richardson and other friends. He also appealed in the will to Richardson to correct his account of Archbishop Thomas Tenison in his new edition of Godwin's De Præsulibus. This Richardson did.

When the precentorship of Lincoln, one of Potter's options, became vacant on 18 May 1756, Richardson claimed it, and filed a bill in chancery against Archdeacon John Chapman, another claimant. Robert Henley, the Lord Keeper, gave a decision in November 1759 against Richardson, who, on the advice of Charles Yorke, appealed to the House of Lords. On 18 February 1760, after a trial lasting three days, the case was decided, mainly through the influence of Lord Mansfield, in his favour. Richardson was installed in the precentorship on 3 March 1760, and held it until death.

== Works ==
His father's brother, John Richardson (1647–1725?), was fellow of Emmanuel College, Cambridge, from 1674 until 1685, and rector of North Luffenham, Rutland, from 1685 until his ejection as a non-juror in 1690. He wrote a Vindication of the Canon of the New Testament against Toland (London, 1700; 3rd edit. 1719); and Thirty-nine Prælectiones delivered in Emmanuel College Chapel, which his nephew William edited in 1726.

At the request of Bishop Edmund Gibson and Bishop Potter, Richardson undertook his major work, a new edition of Francis Godwin's work on the English episcopate, De Præsulibus Angliæ Commentarii. He moved to Cambridge in 1734 for the libraries and to work with Thomas Baker and other antiquaries. The book appeared in 1743.

Richard left collections on the constitution of his university and biographical anecdotes of its members. Memoirs by him of about 350 persons are in the Cambridge University Library, in shorthand and with symbols not easily interpreted. He also drew up a list of graduates from 1500 to 1735 with some additions to 1745, which is inaccurate. Several quarto volumes of his manuscripts, mostly relating to the university and to his own college, were in the treasury of Emmanuel College; some other collections by him are said to be lost. Notes by him on puritan divines connected with the university are in George Dyer's Cambridge University.

== Family ==
In 1728 he married at St. Olave's Anne, only daughter and heiress of William Howe of Cheshire, and widow of Captain David Durell. William Richardson's only son was the priest, Robert Richardson.

== Notes ==
Attribution

This article incorporates text from a publication now in the public domain: "Richardson, William (1698-1775)". Dictionary of National Biography. London: Smith, Elder & Co. 1885–1900.
