= Charles Talbot (priest) =

English churchman

Charles Talbot (26 October 1769 – 28 February 1823) was an English churchman, Dean of Exeter from 1802, and Dean of Salisbury from 1809.

== Early life ==
His parents were the Rev. George Talbot, son of Charles Talbot, 1st Baron Talbot of Hensol, and his wife Anne Bouverie, daughter of Jacob Bouverie, 1st Viscount Folkestone.

== Career ==
He became rector of Wimborne in 1794. He served as Dean of Exeter from 1802, and Dean of Salisbury from 1809.

== Personal life ==
On 27 June 1796, Talbot married Lady Elizabeth Somerset, daughter of Henry Somerset, 5th Duke of Beaufort and his wife Elizabeth Boscawen. They had 14 children, including:

- Frances Cecil Talbot (d. 1855), who married Hon. Philip Henry Abbot, son of Charles Abbot, 1st Baron Colchester. They had a son, and daughter.
- Maria Charlotte Talbot (d. 1827), who married Henry Every, son of Sir Henry Every, 9th Baronet. She died a year after their marriage, without issue.
- Georgiana Elizabeth Talbot (d. 1885), who married Rev. Augustus Philip Clayton, son of Sir William Clayton, 4th Baronet. They had a son, and daughter.
- Rev. Henry George Talbot (1798–1867), who married Mary Elizabeth Ponsonby, daughter of Maj.-Gen. Sir William Ponsonby.
- Rear-Adm. Charles Talbot (1801–1876), who also married a daughter of Maj.-Gen. Ponsonby, the Hon. Charlotte Georgiana Ponsonby. They had seven children.
- Col. George Talbot (1809–1871), who married Frances West, daughter of Lt.-Col. F. Ralph West of the 33rd Regiment. They had a son, Maj.-Gen. FitzRoy Somerset Talbot.

Talbot died on 28 February 1823.

== Notes ==
Church of England titles
Preceded by Charles Harward	Dean of Exeter; 1803–1809	Succeeded by George Gordon
