= Gilbert de Gant, Earl of Lincoln =

English nobleman

- Tenure: c. 1149 – 1156
- Predecessor: New creation
- Successor: Extinct
- Born: c. 1126
- Died: 1156 (aged 29–30)
- Spouse: Rohese de Clare
- Issue: Alice de Gant
- Father: Walter de Gant
- Mother: Maud of Brittany

Gilbert de Gant, 1st Earl of Lincoln (c. 1126 – 1156) was an English nobleman who fought for King Stephen during The Anarchy.

He was the son of Walter de Gant (third son of the Domesday magnate Gilbert de Gant, Gant being a contemporary name for Ghent) and Maud of Brittany, a daughter of Stephen, Count of Tréguier. Gilbert was thus a nephew of Alan, 1st Earl of Richmond, one of King Stephen's commanders. Another uncle, Robert de Gant, was Lord Chancellor for King Stephen. His father Walter de Gant is thought to have accompanied David, Earl of Huntingdon (later King David I) when he came north to the Lowlands in the early 1100s. Walter de Gant became known as Walter de Lindsey, a baron in Scotland under King David. He is described in 19th-century clan records using modernized spellings as "Walter de Ghent Now Walter de Lindsay".

While still fairly young, Gilbert fought on the side of King Stephen at the Battle of Lincoln in 1141, where he was captured along with the king. He was then compelled to marry Rohese de Clare, daughter of Richard de Clare and Adeliza de Meschines, and a niece of Ranulph de Gernon, 2nd Earl of Chester.

In 1149 or 1150 the king created him Earl of Lincoln as a rival to William de Roumare, who had gone over to the side of Empress Matilda. Evidence suggests that in the period 1149–1151, Stephen almost lost control of Yorkshire and that the only magnates in Yorkshire who openly supported him at the time were Gilbert de Gant and his brother Robert.

He and Rohese had only one child, a daughter, Alice de Gant, who married Simon III de Senlis, son of Simon II de Senlis, Earl of Huntingdon-Northampton.

He founded Rufford Abbey c. 1148 in Nottinghamshire, England.
