= Stephen of Lexington =

English Cistercian monk, abbot and founder of a college in Paris

Stephen of Lexington (or "de Lexington", "Lexinton", "Lessington") (born c. 1198, d. 21 March, probably in 1258), was an English Cistercian monk, abbot, and founder of a college in Paris.

== Life ==
Stephen came from a prominent family of royal officials and clerics. His father Richard was a royal judge; his brothers John Lexington and Robert of Lexinton were judges and royal officials, while his brother Henry of Lexington became Bishop of Lincoln.

Stephen was a disciple of Saint Edmund of Abingdon (1175-1240); supposedly he was one of seven students brought by an abbot to hear Edmund preach, all of whom "renounced the world". He became a Cistercian monk at Quarr Abbey on the Isle of Wight, but not long after was elected abbot of Stanley Abbey in Wiltshire, where he hosted visits from St. Edmund. In 1228 he was appointed visitor in Ireland, where he deposed several abbots, replacing them with English monks, and sending a number of monks to abbeys in France. In 1229, he was elected abbot of Savigny Abbey, a prominent Cistercian house, where he made many improvements.

In 1231, he visited Savigny's daughter houses in England and issued new regulations for them. In 1238 he reformed Redon Abbey by order of Pope Gregory IX. On his way to a papal council in 1241 he was saved from capture in a naval battle by the efforts of his brother John, who was on his way to the same council as a representative of King Henry III.

On 6 December 1243 he was elected abbot of Clairvaux Abbey, the abbey founded by Bernard in 1115 that was the ultimate parent of most of the Cistercian establishments. Stephen obtained permission from the pope in 1244 to found a Cistercian college in Paris, le Collège des Bernardins, and by 1247 had founded the Cistercian College of St. Bernard, with Alphonse, Count of Poitiers, King Louis IX's brother, as patron. John of Mirecourt, Konrad of Megenberg, and Pope Benedict XII were scholars there in the 14th century.

In 1250, he had the body of Aletha, mother of St. Bernard, moved to Clairvaux. He was removed from his position as abbot in 1255 in an internal political struggle within the order; Stephen had the support of Pope Alexander IV, but the order was supported by King Louis IX and Stephen retired to the Abbey of Orcamp near Noyon where he died on 21 March, perhaps in 1258.

== Letters ==
Stephen's letters during his visitation in Ireland were published in a Cistercian publication in 1946; an English translation was published by Cistercian Publications in 1982.
