= Geoffrey (Dean of Lincoln) =

- See: Diocese of Lincoln
- Predecessor: Adelelm
- Successor: Richard FitzNeal
- Other post: Dean of Lincoln

Personal details
- Denomination: Catholic

Geoffrey (died 1182 or 1183), sometimes known as Geoffrey Kirtling or Kytlynge, was a priest in the Catholic Church. He was appointed Dean of Lincoln between 1181 and 1182. In 1169 - some sources say this may be 1176 - he was a prebendary of Aylesbury. As Geoffrey Kirtling is supposed to have died in 1182 or 1183, as in December 1183 Salomon of Paris wrote to Richard de Malebis and presented him with "four pounds due to his lord Aaron, paid on Monday after Martinmas following the death of Geoffrey [Kirtling], High-Dean of Lincoln, in part payment of 'the great debt which he owes to my Lord Aaron, whereof I have appointed him a day for settlement'."

He should not be confused with Geoffrey, who was Bishop of Lincoln and Archdeacon of Lincoln.
