= Joseph Blakesley =

English clergyman (1808–1885)

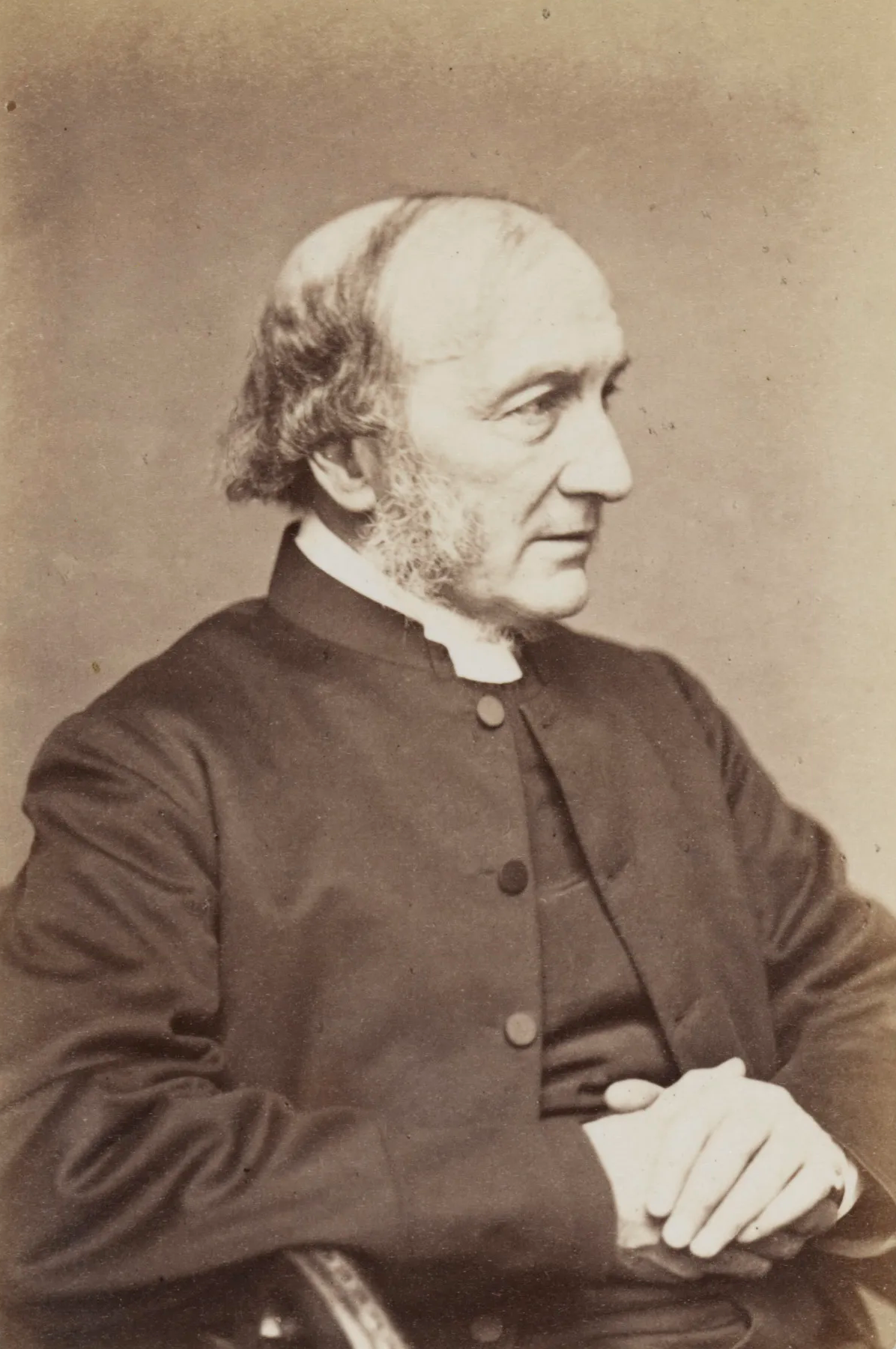
Blakesley in 1874

Joseph Williams Blakesley (6 March 1808 – 18 April 1885) was an English clergyman.

== Life ==
Blakesley was born in London and was educated at St Paul's School, London, and at Corpus Christi and Trinity College, Cambridge. At university he became a member of the "Apostles Club", along with Alfred Tennyson and other literary names. In 1831 he was elected a fellow, and in 1839 a tutor of Trinity. In 1833 he took holy orders and from 1845 to 1872 held the college living of Ware, Hertfordshire. Over the signature "Hertfordshire Incumbent" he contributed a large number of letters to The Times on the leading social and political subjects of the day, and he also wrote many reviews of books for that paper.

He was close to the Rev. Arthur Martineau (1806-1872) with whom he corresponded.

In 1863 he was made a canon of Canterbury Cathedral and in 1872 Dean of Lincoln. Blakesley was the author of the first English Life of Aristotle (1839), an edition of Herodotus (1852–1854) in the Bibliotheca Classica, and Four Months in Algeria (1859).
