= George Gordon (priest) =

English Anglican priest

George Gordon (1760–1845) was an English Anglican priest, Dean of Exeter between 1809 and 1810; and of Lincoln from then until his death on 2 August 1845.

Church of England titles
Preceded by Charles Talbot	Dean of Exeter; 1809–1810	Succeeded by John Garnett
Preceded by Richard Kaye	Dean of Lincoln; 1810–1845	Succeeded by John Ward
