= Robert Richardson (priest) =

English divine

- Born: 1732
- Died: 1781 (aged 48–49); Soho, Westminster, England
- Occupation: Divine

Robert Richardson (1732–1781) was an English divine.

== Biography ==
Richardson was the only son of the antiquary, William Richardson. Robert was prebendary of Lincoln Cathedral, chaplain-in-ordinary to the king, and rector of St. Anne's, Westminster, and of Wallington in Hertfordshire. The last benefice was bestowed upon him by Sir Joseph Yorke, with whom he lived, as chaplain, at The Hague for several years. Richardson printed two sermons, and while in Holland drew up a précis of the documents in the famous lawsuit Hamilton v. Douglas. It was printed for distribution and put into the hands of counsel. His view was adopted by the House of Lords.

Richardson was nominated to be Dean of Lincoln but died before taking office. He died at Dean Street, Soho, on 27 September 1781 in his fiftieth year.
