= William FitzGilbert =

12th-century Chancellor of England

William FitzGilbert was the fifteenth Lord Chancellor of England, from 1141 to 1142, serving the Empress Matilda.

== See also ==
- List of lord chancellors and lord keepers

Political offices
Preceded by Robert of Ghent	Lord Chancellor; 1141–1142	Succeeded by William de Vere
