= Adelelm (dean of Lincoln) =

12th-century Treasurer of England and Dean of Lincoln

- Dean of Lincoln
- Church: Lincoln Cathedral
- Diocese: Diocese of Lincoln
- Appointed: before 1145
- Term ended: after 1173
- Predecessor: Philip of Harcourt
- Successor: Geoffrey
- Other post: Archdeacon of Dorset (before 1139–after 1173)

Personal details
- Died: 25 February 1179
- Denomination: Catholic

Treasurer
- In office c. 1136 – 1139
- Monarch: Stephen
- Preceded by: Nigel
- Succeeded by: Nigel

Adelelm (died 25 February 1179) also known as Adelmus or Ascelinus, was Treasurer of England and nephew of Roger, Bishop of Salisbury. He was also Archdeacon of Dorset (bef. 1139–aft. 1173) and later Dean of Lincoln (bef. 1145–aft. 1173). He was appointed Treasurer around 1136 and was dismissed from office in 1139. During this time he appears to have been made a prebendary of Aylesbury.

== Citations ==
Political offices
Preceded by Nigel	Lord High Treasurer c. 1136–1139	Succeeded by Nigel
