= Hasculf de Tany =

12th-century castellan of the Tower of London

Hasculf de Tany (sometimes Harscoit or de Tani; died about 1140) was an Anglo-Norman feudal baron who lived in medieval England, in the region of London. He is believed to have been castellan of the Tower of London.

== Family connections and marriage ==
Based upon his name, and that of his son Graelen, Hasculf's family may have had ancestry in Brittany. However they came to England from Tanis, in the Avranchin in Normandy, close to Mont Saint-Michel and the frontier with Brittany. It has been proposed that he was a close relative, perhaps even son, of Otuel fitzCount, whose father Hugh d'Avranches was viscount of that region, and that they were both related to the Suligny family, who were also from there. He had contemporaries in England with the same second name who were probably related, named Picot de Tanis, and Juliana de Tanis.

Hasculf married Matilda (or Maud), whose parentage is the subject of different speculations, and she was the mother of Hasculf's son and heir Graelen. Charles Travis Clay demonstrated that Matilda was almost certainly also the mother, apparently from an earlier husband, of Edward of Salisbury the younger, who was noted to be the elder brother of Graelen de Tanys in a 1202 legal case concerning claims by Edward's descendants to be heirs to lands in the barony of Crich. On this basis Clay believed she was a co-heiress of Ralph fitz Hubert, the lord of the feudal barony of Crich in the Domesday Book of 1086. Because of his name, her earlier husband is often believed to be Edward of Salisbury the elder, an older man of the same name as her son.

Indications of a family connection to the Domesday Baron John fitzWaleran are implied by the grant, after his death, made by Hasculf de Tany's widow Matilda and son Graelan of the church of Fyfield in Essex to Bermondsey Priory. They also confirmed the gift of Roger the knight of John fitzWaleran who had given the tithes of Fyfield to that monastery.

== Castellan in London ==
In about 1115–1117, "Asciulus de Taneyo" was a witness together with Otuel fitzCount in a concord involving Gilbert, abbot of Westminster.

A man named Aschuill and described as the successor of Otuel fitzCount as custodian of the tower, is believed to have been Hasculf de Tany. This would mean he became castellan of the Tower of London after the death of Otuel in 1120. In late 1136 or early 1137 this Aschuill was tried before King Stephen of England and the Lord Chancellor Roger le Poer, accused by the Holy Trinity Priory in London of confiscating land belonging to the priory. In the end, the priory regained custody of their land.

In the 1129/30 Pipe Roll, Hasculf appears several times. He was pardoned from paying Danegeld in Essex and Middlesex. This record also indicates that before 1130 Hasculf was involved in a dispute with Rualon d'Avranches over some lands in Essex, which was resolved after a court case in which was levied a fine of 60 marks and a warhorse on Rualon.

Also around 1130 Hasculf de Tany was a witness on London's first royal charter of liberties, granted by Henry I.

After Hasculf's death, the castellany of the Tower went to Geoffrey de Mandeville, the 1st Earl of Essex, and was held to be hereditary.

== Death and legacy ==
Hasculf was dead sometime between 1136/7, when he was involved in the legal case against Holy Trinity Priory, and 1141 when the empress Maud granted Geoffrey de Mandeville, the fief and serjeantry lands which Hasculf de Tani held in England on the day when he had died, which Graelan and his mother were then said to be holding.

Graelan thus became a tenant lord under Mandeville holding seven and a half knights' fees, but by 1166 he once again held these lands directly from the king as a feudal baron. As noted by Stacy, the most recent editor of the 1166 baronial charters, the Tany barony, "with its caput at Aveley (Essex), comprised lands in Essex and Cambridgeshire" and its subordination under Mandeville by King Stephen and Empress Matilda "is unlikely to have survived the earl's revolt in 1143-4".

Graelen was succeeded by his son Hasculf and then his grandson Gilbert, who died in 1221 with no male heir. The barony was subsequently divided.

Hasculf also appears to have had a second son, Gilbert de Tanis, who was father to a younger Graelen in subsequent generations.
