= Thomas Fry (dean of Lincoln) =

English Anglican clergyman

Thomas Charles Fry (16 April 1846 in Sydenham – 10 February 1930 in Lincoln) was an English Anglican clergyman, Dean of Lincoln from 1910 to 1930.

== Biography ==
Thomas Charles Fry was born on 16 April 1846 and educated at Bedford School and Pembroke College, Cambridge. He was a career schoolmaster, teaching at Durham School and Cheltenham College and briefly becoming headmaster of Oundle School. Resigning that job after illness, he held a curacy before his appointment as Headmaster of Berkhamsted School in 1887. He left Berkhamsted School on his appointment to the Deanery in 1910. He died at the Deanery on 10 February 1930.

== Notes ==
Church of England titles
Preceded by Edward Charles Wickham	Dean of Lincoln; 1910–1930	Succeeded by Robert Andrew Mitchell
