= John Ward (priest) =

Very Rev. John Giffard Ward (29 July 1779 – 27 February 1860) was an Anglican priest who was Dean of Lincoln from 1845 to 1860.

He was born in Southampton, Hampshire, the son of John Ward and Anne Marr. He was educated at New College, Oxford and was created a Fellow there in 1813. He had previously held incumbencies in Chelmsford and St James's Church, Piccadilly.

He married Amelia Catherine Lloyd in 1816 in Southampton. They had twin daughters, Harriet Elinor and Amelia Elizabeth Ann, who were artists and unmarried; and four sons: John Francis Ward, a civil servant; Rev. George Andrew Ward, a Fellow of Christ Church College, Oxford; Francis Beckford Ward, who married Emily Louisa Gertrude Bridgeman, daughter of Charles Orlando Bridgeman; and Harry Leigh Douglas Ward, who was a writer on mediæval topics.

He died in 1860 in Lincoln.

Church of England titles
Preceded by George Gordon	Dean of Lincoln; 1845–1860	Succeeded by Thomas Garnier
