= Oliver Sutton (bishop) =

13th-century Bishop of Lincoln

- Bishop of Lincoln
- Elected: 6 February 1280
- Installed: 8 September 1280
- Predecessor: Richard of Gravesend
- Successor: John Dalderby
- Other post: Dean of Lincoln

Orders
- Consecration: 19 May 1280 by Archbishop John Peckham, O.F.M.

Personal details
- Died: 13 November 1299 Nettleham, Lincolnshire
- Denomination: Roman Catholic

Oliver Sutton (died 1299) was a medieval Bishop of Lincoln, in England.

Sutton was the nephew of Henry of Lexington, Bishop of Lincoln from 1253 to 1258. He was Dean of Lincoln before 30 June 1275.

Sutton was elected to the see of Lincoln on 6 February 1280 and consecrated on 19 May 1280 at Lambeth. He was enthroned at Lincoln Cathedral on 8 September 1280.

Sutton died on 13 November 1299 at Nettleham.

== Citations ==
- Rosalind Hill, The Rolls and Register of Bishop Oliver Sutton 1280-1299 (published in eight volumes, 1948–86)

Catholic Church titles
Preceded by Richard of Gravesend	Bishop of Lincoln; 1280–1299	Succeeded by John Dalderby
