= Roger of Salisbury =

Bishop, Chancellor and Justiciar of England (died 1139)

- Bishop of Salisbury
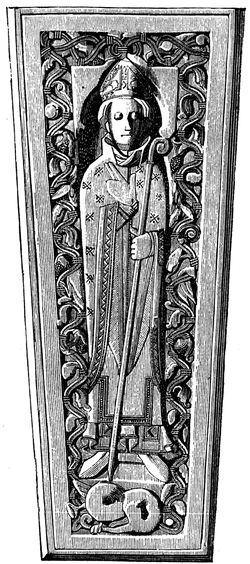
- Monument of Roger, Bishop of Salisbury (died 1139), in his cathedral church.
- Appointed: 29 September 1102
- Term ended: 11 December 1139
- Predecessor: Osmund
- Successor: Henry de Sully

Orders
- Consecration: 11 August 1107

Personal details
- Died: 11 December 1139 Salisbury, England
- Denomination: Catholic

Chief Justiciar of England (de facto)
- In office ?–1139
- Monarchs: Henry I Stephen
- Succeeded by: Robert de Beaumont, 2nd Earl of Leicester

Lord Chancellor
- In office 1101–1102
- Monarch: Henry I

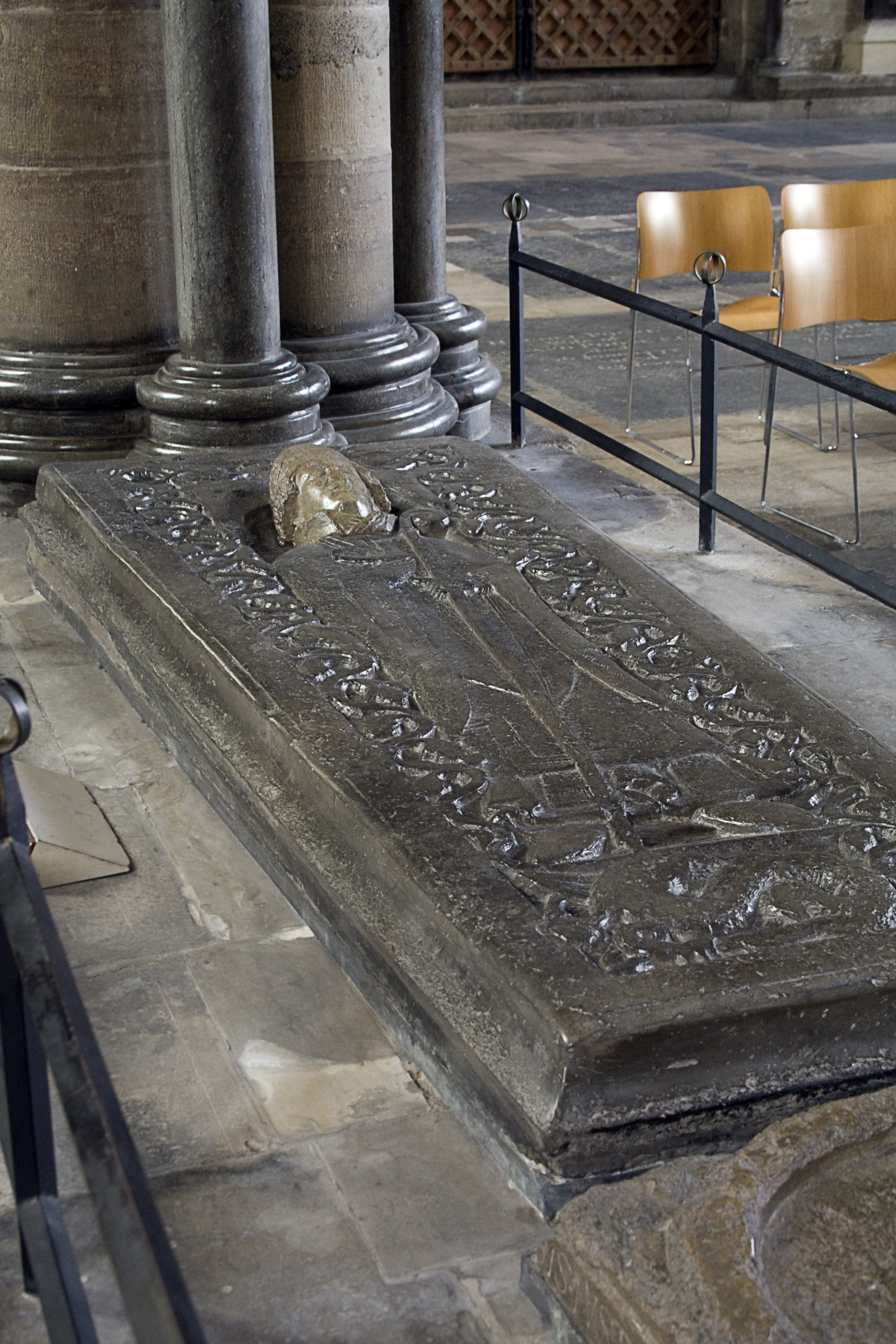
Tomb in Salisbury Cathedral, traditionally held to be Roger's

Roger of Salisbury (died 1139), was a Norman medieval bishop of Salisbury and the seventh Lord Chancellor and Lord Keeper of England.

== Life ==
Roger was originally priest of a small chapel near Caen in Normandy. He was called "Roger, priest of the church of Avranches", in his notification of election to the bishopric. The future King Henry I, who happened to hear mass there one day, was impressed by the speed with which Roger read the service and enrolled him in his own service.

According to William of Newburgh, Roger was poor and uneducated, but this is considered unlikely by the historian B. R. Kemp. On coming to the throne, Henry almost immediately made him Chancellor in 1101. He held that office until late 1102. On 29 September 1102 Roger received the bishopric of Salisbury at Old Sarum Cathedral, but he was not consecrated until 11 August 1107 owing to the dispute between Henry and him. He was consecrated at Canterbury. During the dispute between Henry and Archbishop Anselm of Canterbury, he skillfully managed to keep the favour of both. Roger devoted himself to administrative business, and remodelled it completely. He created the exchequer system, which was managed by him and his family for more than a century, and he used his position to heap up power and riches. He became the first man in England after the King, and was in office, if not in title, justiciar. He was never called Justiciar during Henry's reign.

In 1106 Henry defeated and captured his elder brother, Robert Curthose, at the Battle of Tinchebrai, and then handed Robert into Roger's custody. In the first two decades of Henry's reign, Roger played a major role in governing England when the king was abroad, and after 1120 he was chief minister and regent between 1123 and 1126. In 1123 he helped to secure the see of Canterbury for his nominee, William de Corbeil.

Though Roger had sworn allegiance to Matilda, he disliked the Angevin connection, and went over to Stephen, carrying with him the royal treasure and administrative system upon Stephen's accession in 1135. Stephen placed great reliance on him, on his nephews, the bishops of Ely and Lincoln, and on his son Roger le Poer, who was treasurer.

The king declared that if Roger demanded half of the kingdom he should have it, but chafed against the overwhelming influence of the official clique whom Roger represented. Roger had built Devizes Castle, described by Henry of Huntingdon as "the most splendid castle in Europe". He and his nephews seem to have secured a number of castles outside their own dioceses, and the old bishop behaved as if he were an equal of the King. At a council held in June 1139, Stephen found a pretext for demanding a surrender of their castles, and on their refusal they were arrested. After a short struggle all Roger's great castles were sequestrated. However, Henry of Winchester demanded the restoration of the bishop.

The king was considered to have committed an almost unpardonable crime in offering violence to members of the church, in defiance of the scriptural command, "Touch not mine anointed". Stephen took up a defiant attitude, and the question remained unsettled. This quarrel with the church, which immediately preceded the landing of the Empress, had a serious effect on Stephen's fortunes. The moment that the fortune of war turned against him, the clergy acknowledged Matilda. Bishop Roger, however, did not live to see the resolution of these troubles; he died on 11 December 1139. He was a great bureaucrat, and a builder whose taste was in advance of his age. However, his contemporaries were probably justified in regarding him as the type of the bishop immersed in worldly affairs, ambitious, avaricious, unfettered by any high standard of personal morality.

Roger had a nephew Alexander (d. 1148), who became bishop of Lincoln in 1123. Other nephews included Adelelm, archdeacon of Dorset and later dean of the diocese of Lincoln, and Nigel of Ely, bishop of Ely. Roger's son Roger le Poer was Lord Chancellor for King Stephen.

== Citations ==
Political offices
Preceded by None (disputed)	Chief Justiciar; Held the office without the title	Succeeded by Robert de Beaumont, 2nd Earl of Leicester
Preceded by William Giffard	Lord Chancellor; 1101–1102	Succeeded by Waldric
Catholic Church titles
Preceded by Osmund	Bishop of Salisbury; 1102–1139	Succeeded by Henry de Sully
