= Edward Wickham (priest) =

Dean of Lincoln Cathedral (1834–1910)

Edward Charles Wickham (1834–1910) was an English Anglican priest, Dean of Lincoln from 1894 to 1910.

Born on 7 December 1834, he was educated at Winchester and New College, Oxford, being appointed a Probationary Scholar at 17 and eventually rose to be a Fellow. He was Headmaster of Wellington College from 1873 to 1893 before his appointment to the Deanery. He was married to Agnes, elder daughter of William Ewart Gladstone, prime minister. He died on 18 August 1910.

== Notes ==
Church of England titles
Preceded by William John Butler	Dean of Lincoln; 1894 – 1910	Succeeded by Thomas Charles Fry
