= John Dalderby =

14th-century Bishop of Lincoln

- Bishop of Lincoln
- Elected: 15 January 1300
- Term ended: 12 January 1320
- Predecessor: Oliver Sutton
- Successor: Anthony Bek
- Other post: chancellor of Lincoln

Orders
- Consecration: 12 June 1300

Personal details
- Died: 12 January 1320
- Denomination: Catholic

John Dalderby (or Aldberry or d'Aldreby; died 1320) was a medieval Bishop of Lincoln.

== Life ==
Dalderby was rector of Dalderby in Lincolnshire before holding the prebendary of North Kelsey in the diocese of Lincoln. He was chancellor of Lincoln before 24 April 1291.

Dalderby was elected to the see of Lincoln on 15 January 1300 and consecrated on 12 June 1300 at Canterbury.

Dalderby died on 12 January 1320.

== Citations ==
Catholic Church titles
| Preceded by Oliver Sutton | Bishop of Lincoln; 1300–1320 | Succeeded by Anthony Bek |
