= Richard of Gravesend =

13th-century Bishop of Lincoln

- Bishop of Lincoln
- Elected: September 1258
- Term ended: 18 December 1279
- Predecessor: Henry of Lexington
- Successor: Oliver Sutton
- Other post: Dean of Lincoln

Orders
- Consecration: 3 November 1258

Personal details
- Died: 18 December 1279 Stow Park, Lincolnshire
- Denomination: Catholic

Richard of Gravesend (or Richard de Gravesend; died 18 December 1279) was a medieval Bishop of Lincoln.

== Life ==
Richard was a native of Gravesend in Kent. He was a treasurer of the diocese of Hereford around 1238. By 16 June 1250 he was Archdeacon of Oxford in the diocese of Lincoln. Before August 1254, he was holding the office of Dean of Lincoln.

Richard was elected to the see of Lincoln on 21 or 23 September 1258 and consecrated on 3 November 1258 at Canterbury. He supported Simon de Montfort and was suspended from office and in exile from 1265 to 1267.

Richard died on 18 December 1279 at Stow Park.

Richard was the uncle of Richard of Gravesend, who was Archdeacon of Northampton.

== Citations ==
Catholic Church titles
Preceded by Henry of Lexington	Bishop of Lincoln; 1258–1279	Succeeded by Oliver Sutton
