= Philip de Harcourt =

12th-century Bishop of Bayeux and Chancellor of England

- Bishop of Bayeux
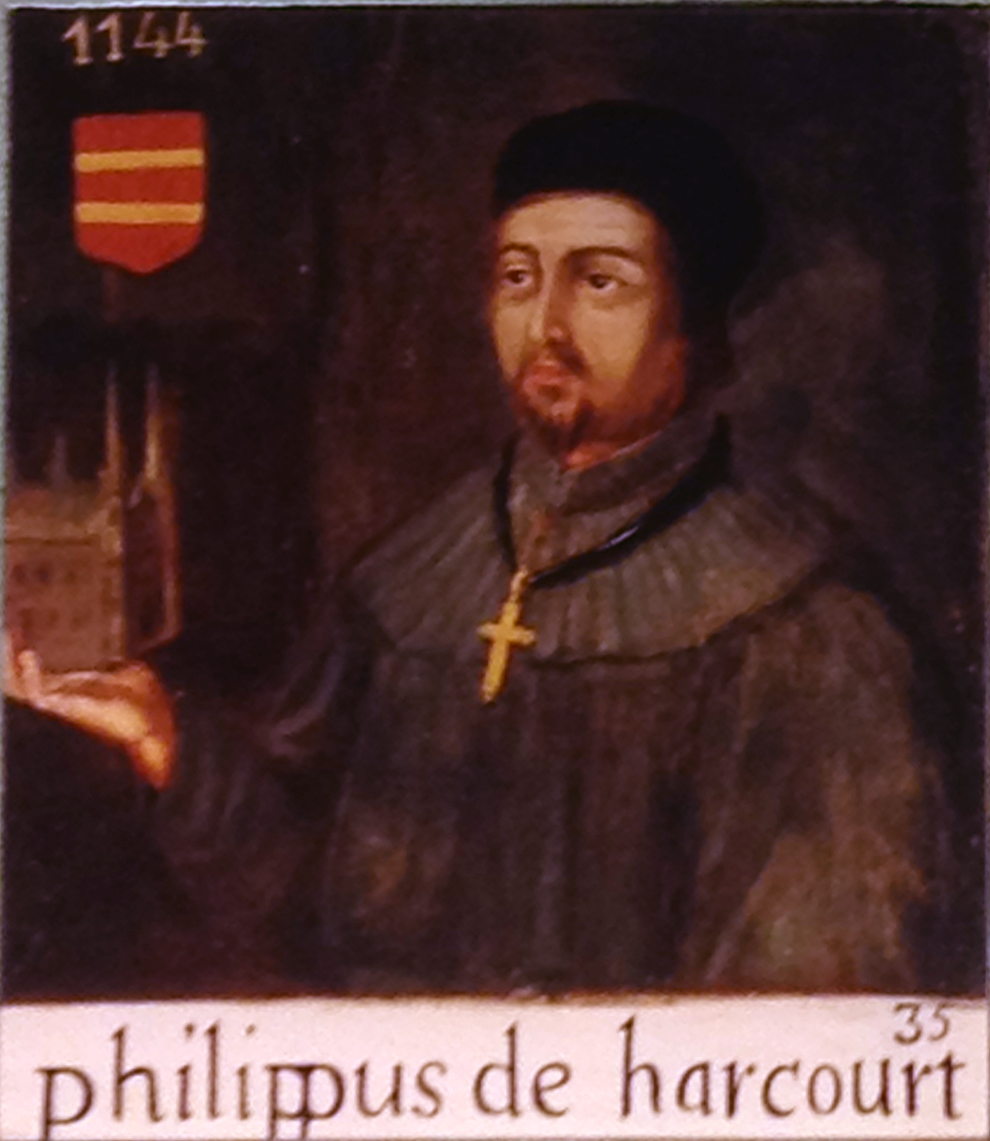
- Appointed: 1142
- Term ended: 1163
- Other posts: Bishop of Salisbury-elect; Dean of Lincoln

Personal details
- Denomination: Catholic

Lord Chancellor
- In office 1139–1140
- Monarch: Stephen of England
- Preceded by: Roger le Poer
- Succeeded by: Robert of Ghent

Philip de Harcourt was a medieval Lord Chancellor of England and Bishop of Bayeux. He was unsuccessfully elected as the Bishop of Salisbury.

== Life ==
De Harcourt was the son of Robert who was the son of Anschetil, lord of Harcourt, Eure in France. He was the dean of the collegiate church at Beaumont-le-Roger in Normandy by 1131 before being appointed Dean of Lincoln about 1133. During this time he appears to have been made a Prebendary of Aylesbury. He was also archdeacon of Évreux as well. He was Lord Chancellor for King Stephen of England from 1139 to 1140, resigning probably in March. Philip was a partisan of Waleran, Count of Meulan.

In March 1140 de Harcourt was nominated to the Bishopric of Salisbury but the election was quashed in 1141. He was nominated by King Stephen with the advice of Waleran of Melun, but Philip's election was opposed by Henry of Blois, bishop of Winchester who was also the papal legate in England and Stephen's brother. Philip appealed to Pope Innocent II but was refused.

In 1142 de Harcourt was named Bishop of Bayeux, an office he held until 1163.

== Citations ==
Political offices
Preceded by Roger le Poer	Lord Chancellor; 1139–1140	Succeeded by Robert of Ghent
Catholic Church titles
Preceded by Henry de Sully	Bishop of Salisbury election quashed 1140–1141	Succeeded by Josceline de Bohon
Preceded by ?	Bishop of Bayeux; 1142–1163	Succeeded by ?
