= Samuel Fuller (priest) =

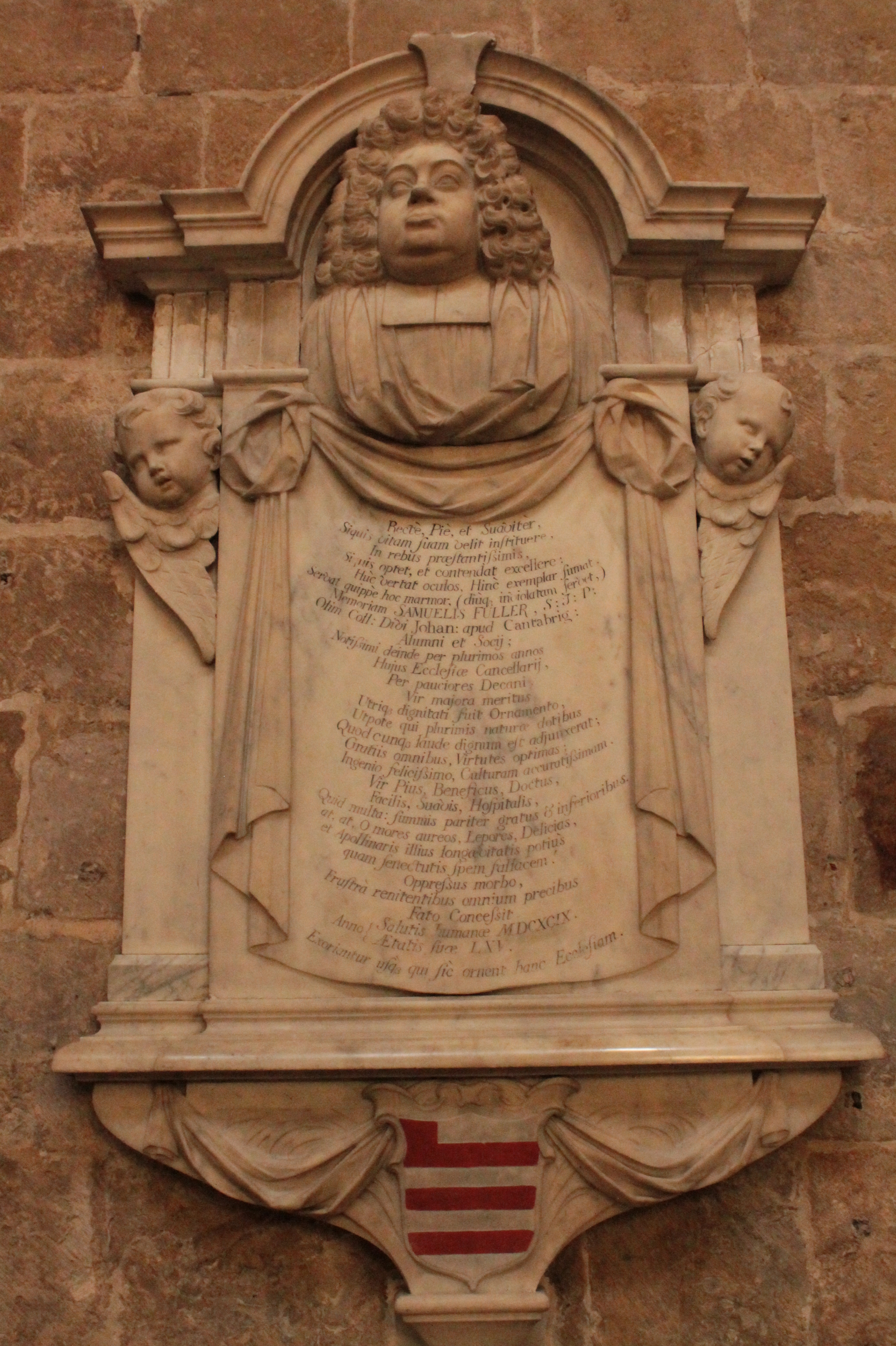
The grave of Rev Samuel Fuller, Lincoln Cathedral

Samuel Fuller or Fulwar (1635–1700), was Dean of Lincoln.

== Life ==
Fuller was the second son of the Rev. John Fuller, vicar of Stebbing, Essex, who died minister of St Martin's, Ironmonger Lane, in the city of London, and Dorcas, his wife, was born at Stebbing, and baptised 16 July 1635. He was educated at St John's College, Cambridge, taking his degree of B.A. in 1654, M.A. 1658 (M.A. Oxon. 1663), B.D. 1665, D.D. 1679. He was elected fellow of St John's 25 March 1656–7. Kennett tells us that he, together with his elder brother, Dr. Thomas Fuller, fellow of Christ's College and rector of Navenby, Lincolnshire, and Willingale-Doe, Essex, received holy orders before the Restoration from their uncle, Dr Thomas Fulwar (called Fuller by Wood, Fasti Oxon. ii. 29), successively bishop of Ardfert 1641, and archbishop of Cashel 1660–1661. The third brother, Francis, also ordained by his uncle, is described by Kennett as 'an uneasy man,’ never staying long in one place, and died a presbyterian minister.

Samuel Fuller became vicar of Elmdon, Essex, 8 August 1663, and resigned the charge in 1668–1669 on receiving the rectory of Tinwell, Rutland, from his patron the Earl of Exeter. William Fuller, bishop of Lincoln, appointed him one of his chaplains, Kennett says, 'for his name's sake,’ and on 25 March 1670 gave him the chancellorship of his cathedral. The next year, 26 June, he became rector of Knaptoft, Leicestershire, and on the death of Dean Brevint was elected dean of Lincoln 6 December 1695. He had previously been appointed chaplain in ordinary to the king. Kennett informs us that Fuller obtained the deanery 'through the interest of the lay lords, who loved him for his hospitality and his wit.' The king, William III, refused for a time to appoint one whose qualifications were rather those of a boon companion than of an ecclesiastic, but at last yielded to importunity. The Exeter family were Fuller's powerful patrons, he having learnt 'how to accommodate himself to the genius of that house.'

His portrait was hung up in 'the drinking-room' at Burghley House, and his rosy, jovial face was painted by Antonio Verrio on the great staircase of that mansion 'for Bacchus astride of a barrel.' Fuller had expected to be appointed to the mastership of his college (St John's), and, says Kennett, 'seemed to please himself with a prospect of that station.' He was also disappointed of the rectory of St Clement Danes, which he made no doubt his interest with the Exeter family would secure for him. According to Kennett Fuller's end was hastened by overindulgence in the pleasures of the table: 'He was a plentiful feeder and at times a liberal drinker, though in small glasses, and his ill habit of body was imputed to Lincoln ale.' He died at the age of sixty-five, 4 March 1699 – 1700, and was buried in his cathedral, where a mural monument was erected to his memory, with a portrait bust in alto-relievo, and a very laudatory epitaph in latinity of remarkable excellence, the composition of the Rev. Anthony Reid, minor canon of the cathedral and master of the grammar school, to whom, writes Kennett, the dean had been 'a special familiar friend.' He is described as 'vir pius, beneficus, doctus, suavis, hospitalis,’ possessing 'mores aureos, lepores, delicias,’ and universally popular with men of the highest as well as of the lowest rank, the epitaph ending with 'exoriantur usque qui sic ornent hanc ecclesiam.' During his short tenure of office he made considerable alterations and improvements in the deanery house.

His grave in Lincoln Cathedral lies in the south transept.

== Works ==
Fuller printed a few separate sermons, among which was one preached before King William III at Whitehall, 25 June 1692, on Matt. xxii. 21–2, and published by royal command. He also published a defence of Anglican orders under the title Canonica Successio Ministerii Ecclesiæ Anglicanæ contra Pontificos et Schismaticos Vindicata, Cambridge, 1690, 4to. Baxter holds Fuller up to obloquy as 'impudent; beyond the degree of human pravity,’ for publishing the doctrine that the bishop is the sole pastor of his diocese, and that 'the pastorate of parish priests was never heard of before the madness of that and the foregoing age'.
