= Peter de Medburn =

English jurist and university chancellor

Peter de Medburn was an English medieval jurist and university chancellor.

Peter de Medburn was a Doctor of Laws. In 1294, he was Chancellor of the University of Oxford.

Academic offices
Preceded by Roger de Martival	Chancellor of the University of Oxford; 1294	Succeeded by Roger de Weseham
