= Robert of Lexinton =

British judge and administrator

Robert of Lexinton (or Lessington; died 29 May 1250) was a British judge and administrator.

== Biography ==
Robert of Lexinton was a son of Richard of Lexinton (probably the first son, according to the Oxford Dictionary of National Biography, probably the second according to the Dictionary of National Biography.

His father for a time administered the manor of Laxton in Nottinghamshire (formerly Lexington, from whence the family's name derived). Robert's brothers included Henry of Lexington, sometime Bishop of Lincoln, and Stephen of Lexington, a Cistercian monk and abbot of Clairvaux abbey. He made his start as a clerk to a successor of his father as keeper of the manor of Laxton, one Brian de Lisle.

In 1214 he was appointed as a prebendary of the collegiate church of Southwell, and later succeeded to the barony of his father, who was alive in 1216. By 1221, he was acting as a justice in seven counties, and comes to notice in February 1221 as the author of a letter to Hubert de Burgh informing him of the route taken by the rebel Earl of Aumale and of the measures that he had adopted to secure the safety of the border. He continued to be employed in a like capacity in later years, being in 1225 the head of six judicial commissions.

He was warden of the honour and castle of Peak and governor of Bolsover Castle in Derbyshire, and also had charge of Orford Castle. He is described as a justice 'de banco' in 1226, and as one of the chief members of the king's court, or bench, in 1229, when he sat with other judges at Westminster to hear the case between the convent and the townsmen of Dunstable. There is reason to suppose that in 1234 he was the senior of the justices of the king's bench. In 1239 he is said to have been elected to the see of Lichfield, but, the right of election being then in dispute between the canons of Lichfield and the monks of Coventry, to have declined it.

When in 1240 Henry III sent justices itinerant through the whole kingdom in the hope of raising money by fines and the like, he appointed Robert chief of the justices for the northern division of England. When he and his brother-justices sat at Lincoln they were denounced by the dean of Christianity (or 'rural dean') for trying capital cases on Sunday. In return they abused the dean, and caused his goods and the lands of his nieces, his wards, to be seized on behalf of the crown. Bishop Robert Grosseteste wrote him a sharp rebuke for his presumption in dealing thus with a clerk. He again acted as a justice itinerant the following year.

After having gained a high reputation and large possessions, he was seized with paralysis, and retired from office a few years before his death, spending the remainder of his life in prayer and almsgiving. He died on 29 May 1250, and was succeeded by his elder brother John. He founded three chantries in the chapel of St. Thomas the Martyr in Southwell Minster.

Legal offices
Preceded by Sir Thomas of Moulton	Chief Justice of the Common Pleas; 1236–1244	Succeeded by Henry of Bath
