= Devizes Castle =

Grade I listed castle in the United Kingdom

- Wiltshire, England
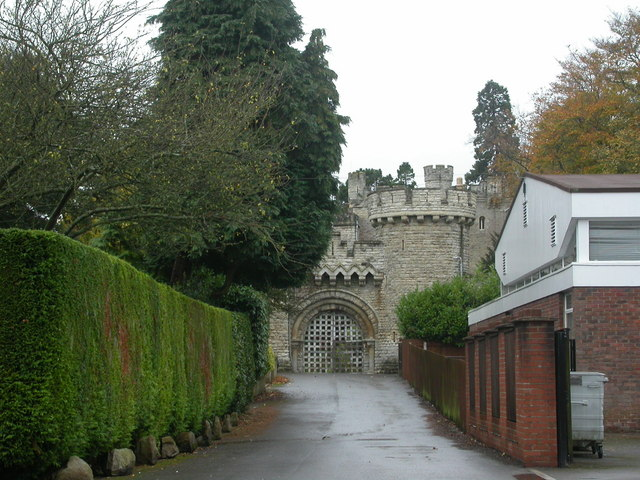
- Entrance to the Victorian castle

Site information
- Type: Motte-and-bailey
- Owner: Private
- Open to the public: no
- Condition: Fragments of medieval castle remain

Location
- Shown within Wiltshire
- Location within Wiltshire
- Coordinates: 51.3508°N 1.9985°W
- Grid reference: grid reference SU002613

Site history
- Battles/wars: The Anarchy, English Civil War

Devizes Castle was a medieval fortification in the town of Devizes, Wiltshire, England, on a site now occupied by a Victorian-era castle. It is a Grade I listed building. The original castle (not currently visible) was overbuilt by the current structure. Records indicate that the first castle on the site had its origins in about 1080 as an early Norman motte and bailey with wooden pallisade and tower.

== Medieval building ==
The first motte-and-bailey castle on this site was probably built around 1080 by Osmund, Bishop of Salisbury. It is first mentioned in 1106, when Robert of Normandy was imprisoned in it, and, despite reports, it is not mentioned in the Domesday Book of 1086. It became known by its Latin name Castrum ad divisas, the castle at the boundaries, because it was located at a place where three parishes joined. That later evolved into the word Devizes. The town grew around the castle.

The original structure burned down in 1113 and was rebuilt in stone by Roger, Bishop of Salisbury, by 1120. In that era, it was said (by an unknown source) that it was the most beautiful fortress in Europe. He occupied it under Henry I and the castle was claimed by Stephen, King of England in the 1130s; Empress Matilda once took it but returned the castle to King Stephen when he threatened to kill her son. Matilda later reclaimed it and held the castle for some time. The property was owned by the Crown until the 17th century. It was used as a prison by Henry II and Henry III. It went on to become the property of Henry VIII who gifted it to his wife Catherine of Aragon and then reclaimed it after their divorce.

Important prisoners were held at the castle, including (from 1106) Robert Curthose, eldest son of William the Conqueror, and (in 1232) Hubert de Burgh. Also, in 1206, John, King of England held his second wife Isabella here as a prisoner.

== Civil War and afterwards ==
In 1643, during the Civil War, the castle was occupied by Royalist troops and besieged by Parliamentary forces under Sir William Waller. However, three days later in the Battle of Roundway Down, Waller's army was routed by Royalist forces. At that time, Devizes was a base for Lord Hopton's forces. The castle and town remained in Royalist hands under the military governorship of Sir Charles Lloyd, the King's Chief Engineer, who defended the town against repeated attacks and bombardments by the Parliamentarians. In September 1645, Cromwell with large forces and heavy artillery invaded the town and laid siege to the castle, which surrendered after a bombardment by the 5,000 man Parliamentary army. In May 1648 the castle was dismantled following a Parliamentary Order, a process known as slighting. The stone was used for building other local structures.

The original castle (below the current castle) became a scheduled monument in 1953 based on excavations at the site. The Historic England report provided this information:

The motte and bailey castle at Devizes survives well and is a good example of its type. Despite part of the remains of the original castle having been built over, the motte and the ditch are imposing features, and the relationship between castle and town can still be seen. Additional evidence relating to the castle has been revealed by excavation, and the unexcavated parts of the castle motte, moat and bailey will contain archaeological information and environmental evidence relating to the castle and the landscape in which it was constructed. There is good documentary evidence to show the history of the castle. Devizes Castle had its origins in about 1080 as an early Norman motte and bailey with wooden pallisade and tower ... The castle was used as an Italian prisoner of war camp in WW2. The castle has left its mark on the plan and development of the town of Devizes, where elements of the defensive system, and the way in which the town was laid out around the castle, can still be seen in the town plan today.

In her book Northanger Abbey, written in 1803, Jane Austen referred to the town, but not the castle; in the book John Thorpe was to stop there during one of his journeys.

== Victorian rebuilding ==
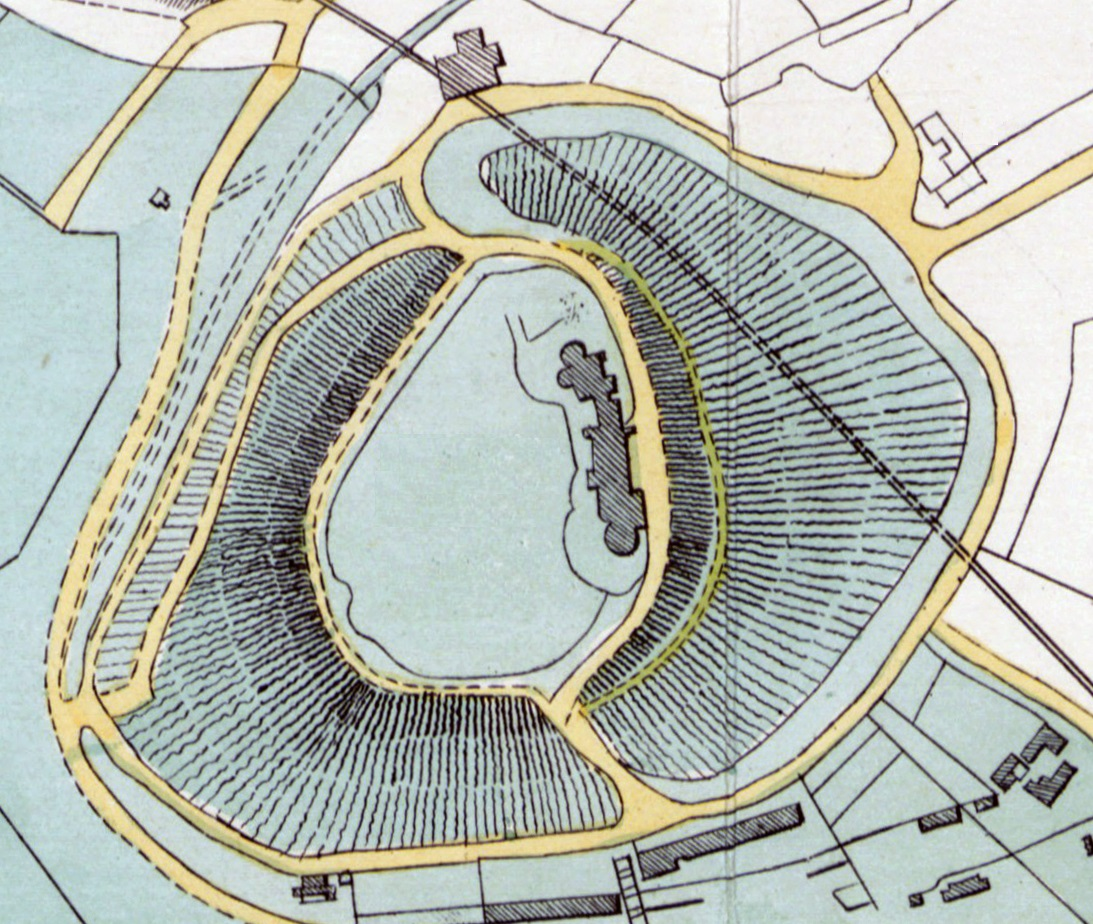
1883 plan of the castle, from the estate sale

In 1838 the castle lands were acquired by J. N. Tylee who sold them in 1838 to Valentine Leach, a Devizes tradesman. The present castellated Victorian era 'castle', in a mixture of Neo-Norman and Gothic Revival styles, was designed by Henry Goodridge, an architect from Bath. It was begun about 1840 with a boldly asymmetrical design, and was extended northwards in the 1860s and succeeding decades. The north tower incorporates the remains of a 17th-century brick windmill.

According to the National Heritage List, excavations of the keep and aisled building were first done in 1858 and indicated "a number of lesser buildings surrounding the hall". The moat was excavated in 1860 when Leach was enlarging the castle. By that time, excavations had already found the footings of the former hall piers.

Subsequently, the property has had a succession of owners, including Sir Charles Rich, Bt. (d. 1913), who made some alterations. In 1951 it was sold in two lots, named "North Tower" and "South Tower".

The current castle, with its turrets, towers and castellations, on a 2.4 acre property, was Grade I listed in 1972 as DEVIZES CASTLE INCLUDING GLASS HOUSE AND GARDEN WALLS ENCIRCLING WEST SIDE OF MOUND. The listing provides specifics as to modifications and enlargement made in the 1860s, 70s and 80s. The interior is described as "designed in a mixture of neo-Norman, Gothic and C16 styles. The drawing room and bedroom in the northern section facing west have the partly original frames of C16 or early C17 ceilings inserted with carved and gilded bosses, small brackets and ribs, the whole completed in plaster".

== 21st century ==
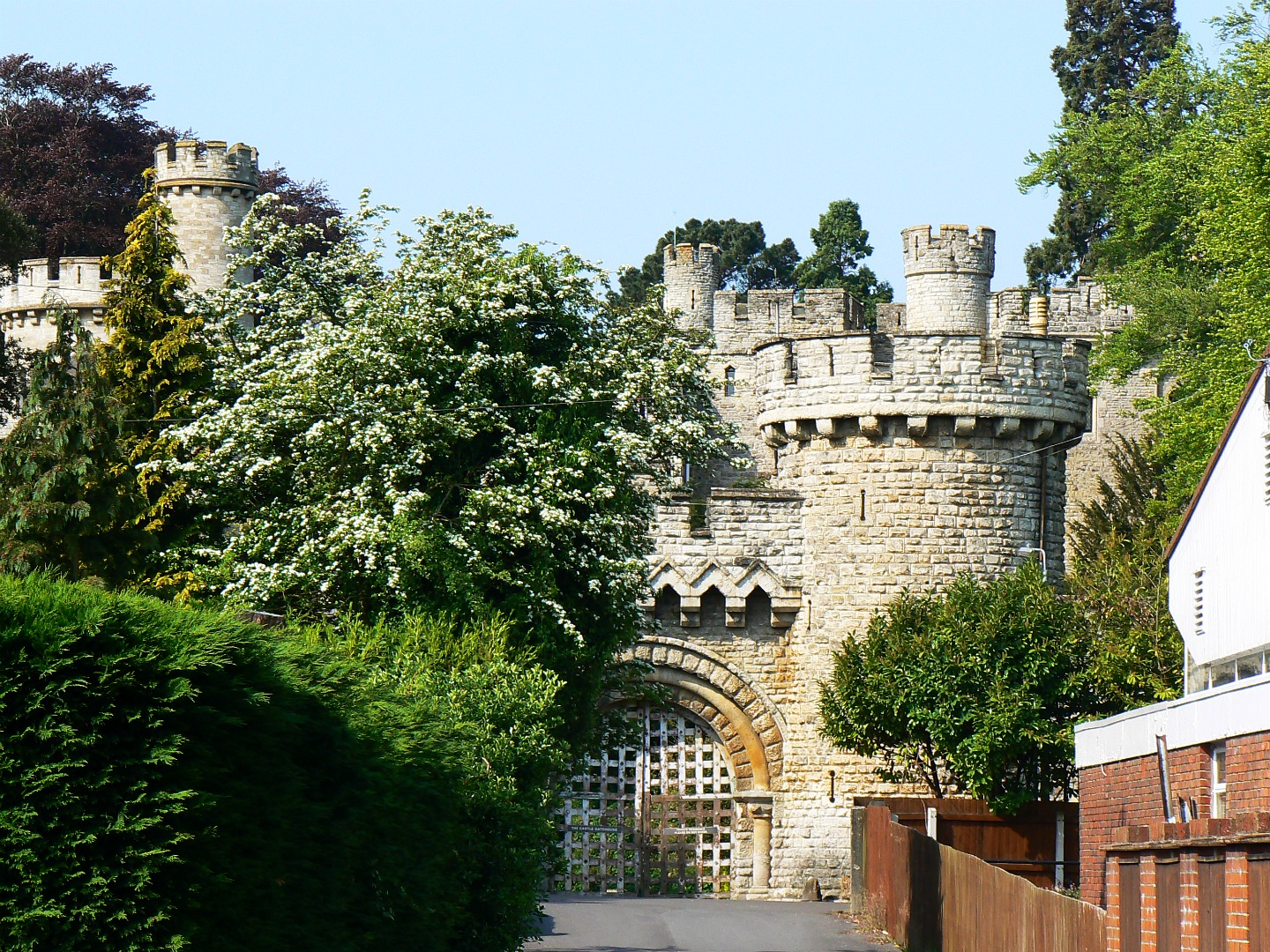
The medieval gatehouse from St Johns Street (2011)

A 2004 report indicated that the owner of the north tower area at the time was Edward Owen, while Mark Lovell owned the south tower area. News coverage in March 2009 stated that Jonathan Lewis was then the owner of the "main section and the north tower". By November 2010, the "north tower and main area" of the castle had been purchased by Julia Dempster. In March 2019, a news article stated that "the castle" was then owned by Lavender Howard but did not specify which section.

The "principal part" of the castle, with gardens in front and rear, was listed for sale in 2018 and again in 2019. Some documents referred to it as "semi-detached" because the south tower area was not included in the sale. Specifics as to the status of the principal part of the castle became available at that time. It was said to be a 9,117-square-foot mansion with nine bedrooms, eight according to some sources, and six full bathrooms. The property included a 2.4-acre lot. Photographs published by Country Life indicated that a great deal of modernization had been completed, and also provided this information:

There are stone mullioned windows, detailed stone archways, cavernous fireplaces, oak floorboards, and spiral staircases ... Several of the rooms – including the drawing room and study – have ornate ceilings with gilded bosses, while the ‘fernery’ accessed via the drawing room has a beautiful encaustic tiled floor and a wooden ceiling ... There are eight bedrooms in total, five of which are on the second floor, with one more on the first floor and the other two on the third floor – including one in the turret ... The living spaces are set across the ground and first floors, and include a huge kitchen/breakfast room, grand entrance hall with wooden staircase, a library and a long gallery.

== See also ==
- Castles in Great Britain and Ireland
- List of castles in England
