= Gilbert de Gant =

Anglo-Flemish noble

Gilbert de Gant (Giselbert de Gand, Ghent, Gaunt) (c. 1040 – 1095) was the son of Ralph, Lord of Aalst near Ghent, and Gisele of Luxembourg, the sister-in-law of Baldwin IV, Count of Flanders. Gilbert de Gant was a kinsman of Matilda of Flanders, wife of William the Conqueror. He had two older brothers, Baldwin and Ralph. Gilbert of Ghent is mentioned in the Domesday Book of 1086 as having been given titles of 172 English manors (most in Lincolnshire and Nottinghamshire) but also within 14 shires where there were estates including York, Derby, Huntingdonshire, Leicestershire and Cambridgeshire.

Gilbert was a commander with William Malet when the city of York was put to the torch on 19 September 1069. Gilbert died about 1095 being buried at Bardney Abbey near Lincoln City.

== Marriage and issue ==
Gilbert married Alice, Dame de Montfort-sur-Risle, the daughter of Hugh de Montfort, Lord of Montfort-sur-Risle, in about 1071. They are known to have had the following children:

- Walter de Gant, married Maud de Penthièvre, had issue.
- Gilbert de Gant, died without issue.
- Hugh III de Montfort, Lord of Montfort-sur-Risle, married Adeline de Meulan, and had children.
- Robert de Gant, Dean of York, Lord Chancellor.
- Ralph de Gant
- Henry de Gant
- Emma de Gant, married Alan de Percy, and had children.
- Agnes de Gant, married William FitzNigel, and had children.
