= Hamo (dean of Lincoln) =

- Dean of Lincoln
- See: Diocese of Lincoln
- Appointed: 1189
- Term ended: 1195
- Predecessor: Richard FitzNeal
- Successor: Roger de Rolleston
- Other post: Archdeacon of Leicester

Personal details
- Died: 1195
- Denomination: Roman Catholic

Hamo de Belers (also spelt Beleyr, Bellers) was a Priest in the Roman Catholic Church. Not to be confused with Hamo who was Dean of York.

== Career ==
He was appointed Archdeacon of Leicester between 1187–1189.

He was then appointed Dean of Lincoln and was a Prebendary of Aylesbury in 1189 and continued in this role until his death in 1195.
