= Simon Bloet =

- Dean of Lincoln
- See: Diocese of Lincoln
- Appointed: 1093 approx
- Term ended: Between 1114-1129
- Predecessor: Ranulph or Ralph
- Successor: Nigel
- Other post: Dean and/or Prebendary in London

Personal details
- Born: 1095 approx Briqueville-la-Blouette, Manche, Normandy, France
- Died: unknown, died in exile
- Denomination: Catholic

Simon Bloet was a priest in the Roman Catholic Church and a member of the Norman noble family that held Ivry in Normandy.

Bloet was brought up in royal fashion. He soon advanced in King Henry I's friendship and in court offices. On his father's death he was fostered by William Rufus. He was described by Henry of Huntingdon as being "quick-witted, a good speaker, physically handsome, radiant with charm, young in years but old in prudence, but tainted with the sin of pride". Whilst attaining such prestige he, for an unknown reason, fell into disfavor and was imprisoned by King Henry I. He escaped by way of a sewer to live in poverty and exile sometime before 1134.

== Career ==
He was appointed by his father, Robert Bloet Bishop of Lincoln, as Dean of Lincoln and was a prebendary of Aylesbury sometime after 1093 whilst still a young child. He may have been a dean and prebendary in London sometime after 1114 and before 1129.

== Family ==
Bloet appears to have had one son, Roger Blewett.
