= Dean of Lincoln =

Ecclesiastical position in England

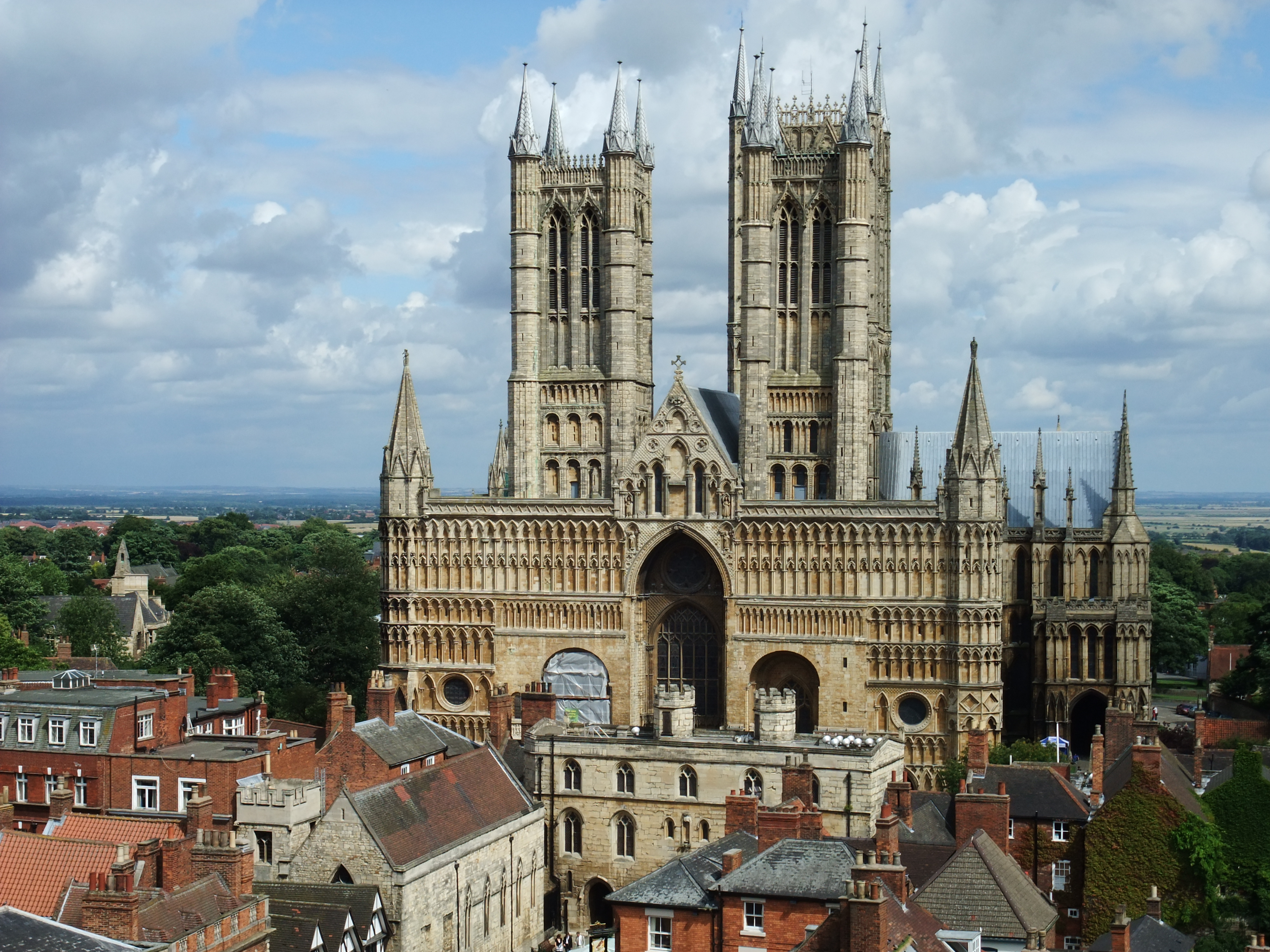
Lincoln Cathedral

The Dean of Lincoln is the head of the Chapter of Lincoln Cathedral in the city of Lincoln, England in the Church of England Diocese of Lincoln. The current dean is Simon Jones.

== List of deans ==
=== High Medieval ===
- c. 1092 Ranulph or Ralph
- aft. 1093–bef. 1133 Simon Bloet
- c. 1133–1141 Philip of Harcourt
- 1141–1179 Adelelm
- c. 1181–1182 Geoffrey
- 1183–1189 Richard FitzNeal
- 1190–1195 Hamo
- c. 1195–bef. 1223 Roger de Rolleston
- 1223–1239 William de Thornaco
- 1240–1245 Roger Weseham
- 1246–1254 Henry of Lexington
- 1254–1258 Richard of Gravesend
- 1260–1262 Robert de Mariscis
- 1262–1272 William of Lexington
- 1272–1274 Richard de Mepham
- 1274–1275 John de Maidenstan
- 1275–1280 Oliver Sutton
- 1280–1288 Nicholas de Hegham
- 1288–1305 Philip Willoughby

=== Late Medieval ===
- 1305 Joceline Kirmington
- 1305–1310 Raymond de Got
- 1310–1315 Roger Martival
- 1315–1328 Henry Mansfield
- 1329–1337 Antony Bek
- 1340–1344 William Bateman
- 1344–1348 John de Ufford
- 1348–1349 Thomas Bradwardine
- 1349–1360 Simon Briselee
- 1361–? John Stretley
- 1376 a foreign Cardinal
- ?–1378 Richard Ravenser
- ?–1412 John Sheppey
- 1412–1452 John Mackworth
- 1452–1483 Robert Flemming
- 1483–1505 George Fitzhugh
- 1506–1508 Geoffrey Symeon
- 1509–1514 Thomas Wolsey
- 1514–1528 John Constable
- 1528–1538 George Heneage
- 1539–1552 John Taylor

=== Early modern ===
- 1552–1554 Matthew Parker
- 1555–1570 Francis Mallet
- 1571–1577 John Whitgift
- 1577–1584 William Wickham
- 1585–1593 Ralph Griffin
- 1593–1598 John Rainolds
- 1598–1601 William Cole
- 1601–1613 Laurence Stanton
- 1613–1629 Roger Parker
- 1629–1649 Anthony Topham
- 1660–1681 Michael Honywood
- 1681–1695 Daniel Brevint
- 1695–1699 Samuel Fuller
- 1700–1701 Abraham Campion
- 1701–1721 Richard Willis
- 1721–1722 Robert Cannon
- 1722–1730 Edward Gee
- 1730–1743 Edward Willes
- 1744–1748 Thomas Cheney
- 1748–1756 William George
- 1756–1761 John Green
- 1762–1781 James Yorke
- Robert Richardson – poss. nominated; d. 1781
- 1782–1783 Richard Cust
- 1783–1809 Sir Richard Kaye, 6th Baronet (styled Richard Kaye until 1789)

=== Late modern ===
- 1809–1845 George Gordon
- 1845–1860 John Ward
- 1860–1863 Thomas Garnier
- 1864 Francis Jeune
- 1864–1872 James Jeremie
- 1872–1885 Joseph Blakesley
- 1885–1894 William Butler
- 1894–1910 Edward Wickham
- 1910–1930 Thomas Fry
- 1930–1949 Robert Mitchell
- 1949–1964 Colin Dunlop (Assistant Bishop of Lincoln from 1950)
- 1965–1968 Michael Peck
- 1969–1989 Oliver Fiennes
- 1989–1997 Brandon Jackson
- 1998–2006 Alec Knight
- 2007–2016 Philip Buckler
- 2016 John Patrick (acting)
- 2016–2023 Christine Wilson
- 2024–present Simon Jones
