= Francis Drope =

Francis Drope (1629?–1671), was an English arboriculturist.

Drope, a younger son of the Rev. Thomas Drope, B.D., vicar of Cumnor, Berkshire, and rector of Ardley, near Bicester, Oxfordshire, was born at Cumnor vicarage about 1629, became a demy of Magdalen College, Oxford, in 1645, three years after his brother John, and graduated as B.A. in 1647. In 1648 he was ejected in the Parliamentary visitation of the University of Oxford; he had probably, like his brother, borne arms for the king. He then became an assistant-master in a private school, kept by one William Fuller, at Twickenham.

At the Restoration he proceeded M.A. (23 August 1660), and in 1662 was made fellow of his college. He subsequently graduated as B.D. (12 December 1667), and was made a prebendary of Lincoln (17 February 1669 – 1670). He died 26 Sept. 1671, and was buried in the chancel of Cumnor Church. His one work, 'A Short and Sure Guide in the Practice of Raising and Ordering of Fruit-trees,’ is generally described as posthumous, being published at Oxford, in 8vo, in 1672. The work is eulogised in the 'Philosophical Transactions,’ vol. vii., No. 86, p. 5049, as written from the author's own experience.
