= John Constable (priest) =

John Constable, was a priest in England during the late 15th and early 16th centuries.

Constable was born in Flamborough and educated at the University of Cambridge. He became Rector of Lockington ifrom 1485 to 1512; Archdeacon of Huntingdon from 1512 to 1514; and Dean of Lincoln from 1514 until his death in 1528.
