= Roger de Weseham (priest) =

English churchman and university chancellor

Roger de Weseham (also Wesenham) was an English medieval churchman and university chancellor.

Roger de Weseham was Doctor or Professor of Divinity. During 1294–97, he was Chancellor of the University of Oxford. He was also Archdeacon of Rochester and a Prebendary of Aylesbury.

Academic offices
Preceded by Peter de Medburn	Chancellor of the University of Oxford; 1294–1297	Succeeded by Richard de Clyve
