= Hugh III de Montfort =

Anglo-Norman noble

- Lord of Montfort-sur-Risle
- Predecessor: Alice, Dame de Montfort-sur-Risle
- Successor: Robert II de Montfort, Lord of Montfort-sur-Risle
- Spouse: Adeline de Beaumont
- Issue: 5, including: Robert II de Montfort, Lord of Montfort-sur-Risle; Waleran de Montfort; Toustain de Montfort, Lord of Beaudésert
- Father: Gilbert de Gant
- Mother: Alice, Dame de Montfort-sur-Risle

Hugh III de Montfort, Lord of Montfort-sur-Risle, was an Anglo-Norman noble.

Hugh was the son of Gilbert de Gant and Alice, Dame de Montfort-sur-Risle. He adopted the name and arms of his mother to inherit the lordship of Montfort-sur-Risle. He joined the baron revolt in Normandy against King Henry I of England in 1122 and was known to be in an English prison in 1123.

== Marriage and issue ==
Hugh married Adeline, daughter of Robert de Beaumont, Earl of Leicester and Count of Meulan, and Elisabeth de Vermandois, they are known to have had the following issue:

- Robert II de Montfort, Lord of Montfort-sur-Risle, married Anne de Fougères; had issue
- a daughter who married Guillaume de Saint-Clair; had issue
- a daughter who married Richard FitzRobert, Sire de Creully; had issue
- Waleran de Montfort
- Toustain (or Thurstan) de Montfort, Lord of Beaudésert; had issue.
