= Lakewood =

Lakewood may refer to:

== Places ==
=== Australia ===
- Lakewood, Western Australia, an abandoned town in Western Australia

=== Canada ===
- Lakewood, Edmonton, Alberta
- Lakewood Suburban Centre, Saskatoon, Saskatchewan

=== Philippines ===
- Lakewood, Zamboanga del Sur

=== United States ===
- Lakewood, California, a city in Los Angeles County
- Lakewood, Colorado, a city in Jefferson County
- Lakewood, Illinois, a village in McHenry County
- Lakewood Balmoral Historic District, Chicago, Illinois
- Lakewood, Indiana, a census-designated place
- Lakewood, Iowa, a ghost town in Lyon County
- Lakewood Township, New Jersey, a township in Ocean County
  - Lakewood (CDP), New Jersey, a census-designated place in Lakewood Township, New Jersey
- Lakewood, New Orleans, Louisiana
- Lakewood, Michigan, an unincorporated community and abandoned summer resort by Long Lake
- Lakewood, New York, a village in Chautauqua County
- Lakewood, Ohio, a large city in Cuyahoga County, and part of the Greater Cleveland Metropolitan area
- Lakewood, Oregon
- Lakewood, Pennsylvania, a village in Wayne County
- Lakewood, South Carolina, a census-designated place in Sumter County
- Lakewood, Tennessee, a neighborhood of Nashville, once a small city
- Lakewood, Dallas, Texas, a neighborhood
- Lakewood, Washington, a city in Pierce County
- Lakewood, Wisconsin, a town in Oconto County
  - Lakewood (CDP), Wisconsin, an unincorporated census-designated place in Oconto County

== Fiction ==
- Lakewood, a fictional town where a string of murders take place in the MTV television series Scream
- The Desperate Hour, a thriller starring Naomi Watts which premiered at the 2021 Toronto International Film Festival as Lakewood before being retitled in commercial release

== Other uses ==
- Lakewood (Livingston, Alabama), an antebellum mansion in Livingston, Alabama
- Lakewood (St. Joseph, Louisiana), a mansion
- Lakewood / Fort McPherson station, a passenger rail station located in Atlanta, Georgia
- Lakewood station, a passenger rail station located in Lakewood, Washington
- Lakewood Church, a non-denominational megachurch in Houston, Texas
- Lakewood Industries, a division of Holley Performance Products, an American automotive performance company
- Lakewood Playhouse, a theatre in Lakewood, Washington
- Lakewood Assembly, a General Motors plant in Lakewood Heights, Atlanta, Georgia

== See also ==
- Lakewood Heights (disambiguation)
- Lakewood Historic District (disambiguation)
- Lakewood Park (disambiguation)
- Lakewood School District (disambiguation)
- Lakewood Township (disambiguation)
- Lakewood Village (disambiguation)
- Lake Wood, Texas
- Lake Wood (Philippines)
