= George Turner =

George Turner may refer to:

== Sports ==
- George Turner (footballer, born 1887) (1887–1958), English footballer
- George Turner (footballer, born 1910) (1910–?), English footballer
- George Turner (cricketer) (1858-1927), New Zealand cricketer
- George Turner (cyclist) (1913–?), Canadian Olympic cyclist
- George P. Turner, New Zealand rugby league international, 1957–1961
- George H. Turner, New Zealand rugby league international, 1964
- George Turner (rugby union, born 1855) (1855–1941), rugby union player for England, and St. George's Hospital Medical School RFC
- George Turner (rugby union) (born 1990), Scottish international rugby union player with Harlequins
- George Turner (basketball), American basketball player, drafted by Dallas and playing for Manila in 1986
- George J. Turner (1873–?), president of the Amateur Athletic Union

== Politics and law ==
- George Turner (judge) (1750–1843), American Revolutionary War officer from South Carolina, judge in the Northwest Territory
- George James Turner (1798–1867), English judge
- George Turner (Nevada judge) (1828–1885), justice of the Territorial Supreme Court of Nevada
- George Turner (American politician) (1850–1932), U.S. Senator from Washington
- George Turner (Australian politician) (1851–1916), Premier of Victoria
- George Turner (British politician) (born 1940), Member of Parliament
- George N. Turner, Chief of Police for the City of Atlanta

== Arts ==
- George Turner (actor, born 1877) (1877–1947), American actor featured in Henry Steps Out, The Man from Toronto and The Diamond Man
- George Turner (American actor), American actor known from Son of Zorro
- George Turner (artist) (1841–1910), English landscape artist and farmer
- George Turner (writer) (1916–1997), Australian science fiction writer

== Others ==
- George Turner (physician) (died 1610), English physician and alchemist
- George Turner (priest) (1734–1797), archdeacon of Oxford from 1783 till 1797
- George Turner (missionary) (1818–1891), missionary on the Samoan Islands in the 19th century.
- George Grey Turner (1877–1951), English surgeon
- George Turner (architect) (1896–1984), American architect in Alabama
- Sir George Turner (civil servant) (1896–1974), British government official
- George B. Turner (1899–1963), American soldier and Medal of Honor recipient
- George Townsend Turner (1906–1979), American philatelic bibliophile
