= John Potter (bishop) =

Archbishop of Canterbury from 1737 to 1747

The Most Reverend and Right Honourable John Potter
- Archbishop of Canterbury
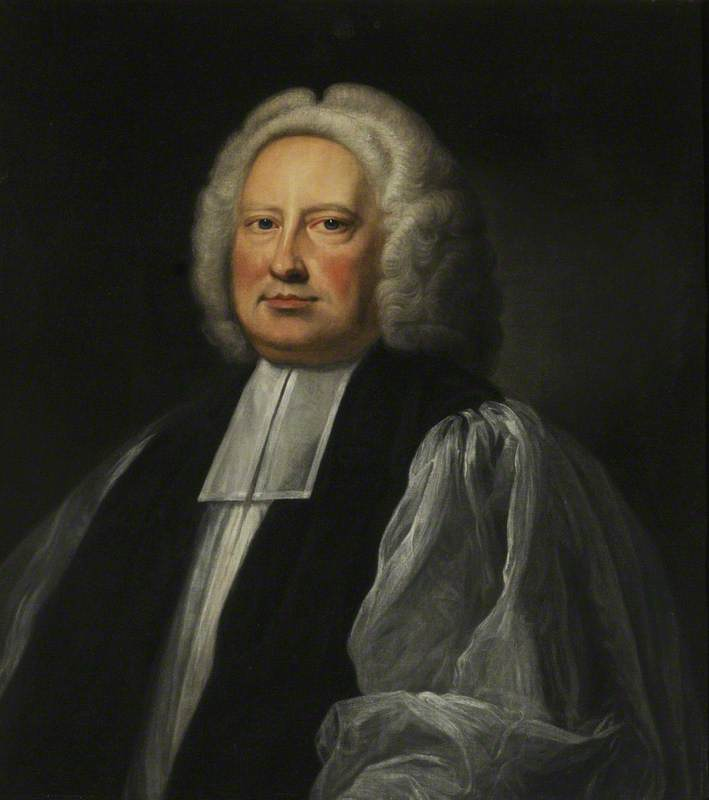
- Church: Church of England
- Diocese: Canterbury
- In office: 1737–1747
- Predecessor: William Wake
- Successor: Thomas Herring
- Previous post: Bishop of Oxford (1715–1737)

Orders
- Consecration: 15 May 1715 by Jonathan Trelawny

Personal details
- Born: c. 1674 Wakefield, Yorkshire, England
- Died: 10 October 1747 Lambeth, London, England
- Buried: Croydon Minster
- Denomination: Anglican
- Spouse: Elizabeth Venner
- Education: University College, Oxford

John Potter (c. 1674 – 10 October 1747) was Archbishop of Canterbury from 1737 to 1747.

== Life ==
He was the son of a linen draper at Wakefield, Yorkshire. At the age of fourteen he entered University College, Oxford, and in 1693 he published notes on Plutarch's De audiendis poetis and Basil's Oratio ad juvenes. In 1694 he was elected fellow of Lincoln College, Oxford and in 1697 his edition of Lycophron appeared. It was followed by his Archaeologia graeca (2 vols. 8vo, 1697–1698), the popularity of which endured till the advent of Dr William Smith's dictionaries. A reprint of his Lycophron in 1702 was dedicated to Graevius, and the Antiquities was afterwards published in Latin in the Thesaurus of Gronovius.

Besides holding several livings he became, in 1704, chaplain to Archbishop Tenison, and shortly afterwards was made Chaplain-in-Ordinary to Queen Anne. From 1708 he was Regius Professor of Divinity and canon of Christ Church Cathedral, Oxford. He married Elizabeth Venner in St. Paul's Cathedral in 1709. She being a granddaughter of Thomas Venner, a Fifth Monarchy man hanged as a traitor. In 1715 he became Bishop of Oxford. In the same year appeared his edition of Clement of Alexandria. In 1707 he published a Discourse on Church Government, and he took a prominent part in the controversy with Benjamin Hoadly, Bishop of Bangor. Even though Potter was a notable Whig, he was a High Churchman and had opposed Hoadly. Bishop Potter also ordained John Wesley a deacon in the Church of England in September 1725, and ordained him a priest in 1728.

In January 1737 Potter was unexpectedly appointed to succeed William Wake in the see of Canterbury. While in that seat, he continued to represent a High Church position, but he was also ineffective at restoring the Convocation. Alexander Pope attacked him in the 1743 version of his The Dunciad (book II, 323).

Potter died on 10 October 1747. His Theological Works, consisting of sermons, charges, divinity lectures and the Discourse on Church Government, were published in three volumes.

He was buried in Croydon Minster in Surrey.

== Arms ==
Coat of arms of John Potter
Notes While serving as a bishop Potter's arms would be displayed impaled with the arms of the diocese and topped by a mitre. Escutcheon Sable a fess Ermine between three cinquefoils Argent.

Academic offices
Preceded by William Jane	Regius Professor of Divinity at Oxford; 1707–1737	Succeeded by George Rye
Church of England titles
Preceded by William Talbot	Bishop of Oxford; 1715–1737	Succeeded by Thomas Secker
Preceded by William Wake	Archbishop of Canterbury; 1737–1747	Succeeded by Thomas Herring
