= David Goldie =

David Goldie may refer to:

- David Goldie (politician) (1842–1926), Mayor of Auckland City and a Member of Parliament in New Zealand
- David Goldie (priest) (1946–2002), priest in the Church of England
