= Lakewood Historic District =

Lakewood Historic District may refer to:

- Lakewood Historic District (Birmingham, Alabama), listed on the NRHP in Birmingham, Alabama
- Lakewood Heights Historic District (Atlanta, Georgia), NRHP-listed

== See also ==
- Lakewood Balmoral Historic District, Chicago, IL, listed on the NRHP in Illinois
- Lakewood Commercial District, listed on the NRHP in Davidson County, Tennessee
