= Nigel McClintock =

Northern Irish musician

Nigel McClintock is a Northern Irish organist, choral conductor and teacher.

== Education and career ==
Nigel McClintock was born in Belfast, Northern Ireland and studied at Methodist College Belfast. He then moved to London, studying piano, organ and choral conducting at the Royal College of Music under Nicholas Danby, Patricia Carroll and Paul Spicer. During his studies, he held organ scholarships at Mill Hill School and St Albans Cathedral, where he worked under Barry Rose.

Between his undergraduate and postgraduate studies at the Royal College of Music, he worked as director of Music at St George's Parish Church, Belfast. There, he produced numerous recordings of the boy choristers with Lammas Records, which were produced by Barry Rose. After received an MMus in Choral Conducting, he worked as director of music at Croydon Parish Church from 2000 to 2007.

In 2008, McClintock took up the position of director of music at St Peter's Cathedral, Belfast, leading the newly formed Schola Cantorum. He also became involved in the Charles Wood Summer School, based in Armagh. In 2010, the choir was the subject of a 3-part BBC One TV documentary, following McClintock as he led the choir to sing at St Peter's Basilica in Rome for the Pope. McClintock left the post in 2018. Since then, the role and choir, in its then format, has disbanded.

In 2023, McClintock was convicted after sending explicit messages to a minor. He was spared a custodial sentence and was given a three year probation to deal with the alcohol abuse underlying the offence.

Preceded by Peter Nardone	Organist and Director of Music, Croydon Parish Church; 2000 – 2007	Succeeded by Andrew Cantrill
