= Archdeacon of Oxford =

Church of England ecclesiastical office

The Archdeacon of Oxford is a senior ecclesiastical officer in the Diocese of Oxford, England. The office responsibility includes the care of clergy and church buildings within the area of the Archdeaconry of Oxford.

== History ==
The first archdeacon of Oxford is recorded before 1092 – around the time when archdeacons were first appointed across England – in the Diocese of Lincoln. He was one of eight archdeacons appointed by the bishop: Lincoln, Huntingdon, Northampton, Leicester, Buckingham, Bedford and Stow.

In the Henrican Reorganization, the archdeaconry was transferred to the newly-erected Diocese of Oxford in 1546. On 1 March 2014, the Archdeaconry of Oxford was split to create the new Archdeaconry of Dorchester; the Archdeaconry of Oxford now consists solely of the City of Oxford itself, whereas the rest of the county of Oxfordshire is now in the Archdeaconry of Dorchester. The Archdeacon of Oxford continues to be Residentiary Canon of Christ Church and has strategic roles across the Diocese of Oxford as a whole, for example as Interfaith Advisor.

== List of archdeacons ==
=== High Medieval ===
- bef. 1092–?: Alfred (first archdeacon)
- bef. 1112–aft. 1151: Walter of Oxford
- bef. 1151–1173 (res.): Robert Foliot
- bef. 1176–1183 (res.): Walter de Coutances
- c. 1184–1196 (res.): John of Coutances (also Dean of Rouen from 1188)
- bef. 1197–aft. 1208: Walter Map (elected Bishop of Hereford in 1199 and Bishop of St David's in 1203)
- bef. 1212–1221 (d.): John of Tynemouth
- bef. 1221–1221 (res.): Matthew Stratton (became Archdeacon of Buckingham)
- bef. 1222 – February 1236 (d.): Adam de Sancto Edmundo
- bef. 1237–1240 (res.): Roger Weseham
- bef. 1240–aft. 1249: John de Sancto Egidio
- bef. 1250–aft. 1252: Richard of Gravesend
- c. 1254–aft. 1258 (res.): Robert de Mariscis
- bef. 1259–1263 (res.): Henry of Sandwich
- bef. 1263–aft. 1272 (res.): Richard de Mepham (previously Archdeacon of Stafford; became Dean of Lincoln)
- bef. 1273–1274 (res.): John de Maidenstan (previously Archdeacon of Bedford; became Dean of Lincoln)
- bef. November 1274–bef. 1277: W.
- bef. 1278–1280 (res.): Nicholas de Hegham
- bef. 1284–aft. 1284: unnamed archdeacon; possible Simon of Ghent.
- bef. 1284–1297 (res.): Simon of Ghent
- 1297–1298 (deprived): Pontius de Salino (lost dispute with Amadeus of Savoy)
- bef. 1298–aft. 1299: Amadeus of Savoy (Archdeacon of Rheims; probably ineffective)
- 15 February 1298 – 5 November 1303 (d.): William de Sardene

=== Late Medieval ===
- 10 December 1303–bef. 1313 (d.): Gilbert Segrave
- 12 March 1313 – 20 December 1356 (d.): Gaillard Cardinal de la Motte/Mothe (Cardinal-deacon of Santa Lucia in Orthea)
- bef. 1368–30 January 1404 (exch.): Thomas Southam (became Archdeacon of Berkshire)
- 9 February 1404 – 23 February 1441 (d.): John Southam
- bef. 1458-bef. 1467 (res.): Fulk Birmingham
- 2 July 1467–bef. 1472 (d.): John Boteler
- 10 October 1472 – 1482 (res.): Lionel Woodville
- 17 April 1482 – 1493 (res.): Oliver King
- 24 January 1493 – 1504 (res.): Richard Mayew
- 15 November 1504–bef. 1522 (d.): Christopher Urswick, Dean of Windsor until 1505 (also Archdeacon of Wilts, Archdeacon of Norfolk and Rector of Hackney)
- 24 March 1522 – 1528 (res.): George Heneage
- 7 October 1528–?: Nicholas Wilson
- 19 January 1535–bef. 1543 (d.): Richard Curwen

=== Early modern ===
- 1543–10 May 1561 (d.): Walter Wright

On 26 January 1546, the archdeaconry was transferred to the new Diocese of Oxford.

- 1561–aft. 1592: John Kennall
- 1592–7 June 1614 (d.): John Drewry
- 17 June 1614–bef. 1624 (d.): William Bridges
- 1625–2 October 1661 (d.): Barten Holyday
- July 1663 – 1664 (dep.): Thomas Lamplugh (lost dispute with Barlow)
- 13 June 1664 – 1675 (res.): Thomas Barlow (became Bishop of Lincoln)
- 12 July 1675 – 21 July 1704 (d.): Timothy Halton
- 5 August 1704 – 20 January 1707 (d.): Humphrey Hody
- 5 February 1707 – 1715 (res.): Timothy Goodwin (became Bishop of Kilmore and Ardagh)
- 21 March 1715 – 1723 (res.): William Baker (became Bishop of Bangor)
- 27 April 1724 – 1724 (d.): Robert Cook
- 26 August 1724 – 4 July 1741 (d.): George Rye
- 23 September 1741–bef. 1767 (res.): John Potter (became Dean of Canterbury)
- 19 January 1767 – 24 March 1783 (d.): Thomas Randolph
- 30 June 1783 – 30 October 1797 (d.): George Turner
- 11 November 1797 – 4 February 1830 (d.): Phineas Pett
- 9 March 1830 – 24 December 1877 (d.): Charles Clerke

=== Late modern ===
- 1878–1895 (d.): Edwin Palmer
- 1895–1902 (res.): Leslie Randall, Bishop suffragan of Reading
- 1903–1921 (ret.): Thomas Archer Houblon
- 1921–1936 (ret.): Edward Shaw, Assistant Bishop
- 1936–1952 (ret.): Gerald Allen (also an Assistant Bishop until 1939; Bishop suffragan of Dorchester from 1939)
- 1957–1982 (ret.): Carlyle Witton-Davies (also Sub-Dean of Christ Church from 1972; afterwards archdeacon emeritus)
- 1982–1997 (res.): Frank Weston (became Bishop suffragan of Knaresborough)
- 1998–2005 (ret.): John Morrison (afterwards archdeacon emeritus)
- 2005–2011 (res.): Julian Hubbard (became Director of Ministry Division)
- 2011–2013 (Acting): Hedley Ringrose, Acting Archdeacon
  - Judy French, Assistant Archdeacon
- 4 May 2013 – 28 January 2020: Martin Gorick (became Bishop suffragan of Dudley)
- 1 May 2020 – present: Jonathan Chaffey

== Archdeacons of Dorchester ==
In 2013 and 2014, the Diocese of Oxford discussed and resolved to undertake some pastoral alterations; the new archdeaconry of Dorchester was created on 1 March 2014. On 19 June 2014, Judy French was collated the first Archdeacon of Dorchester; retired archdeacon Hedley Ringrose was Interim Archdeacon since 2013. French retired effective 30 September 2022. It was announced in February 2023 that David Tyler would become the next Archdeacon of Dorchester; he was so collated on 18 March 2023.

== Sources ==
- Greenway, Diana E. (1977), Fasti Ecclesiae Anglicanae 1066–1300, vol. 3, pp. 35–39
- King, H.P.F. (1962), Fasti Ecclesiae Anglicanae 1300–1541, vol. 1, p. 14
- Horn, Joyce M.; Smith, David M. (1999), Fasti Ecclesiae Anglicanae 1541–1857, vol. 9, p. 21
- Horn, Joyce M. (1996), Fasti Ecclesiae Anglicanae 1541–1857, vol. 8, pp. 84–85
