= Julian Hubbard =

Julian Richard Hawes Hubbard is the current Director of Ministry in the Church of England and a former Archdeacon of Oxford.

He was born on 15 February 1955 and educated at Emmanuel College, Cambridge. He was ordained in 1982 and began his career as a Curate at St Dionis, Parson's Green. He was a Tutor at Wycliffe Hall, Oxford from 1981 to 1984 and Chaplain of Jesus College, Oxford until 1989. Later he was Vicar of Bourne then a Canon Residentiary at Guildford Cathedral. He began his current post in October 2011.

Church of England titles
Preceded by John Morrison	Archdeacon of Oxford; 2005–2011	Succeeded by Martin Gorick
