= Charles Clerke (priest) =

Archdeacon of Oxford

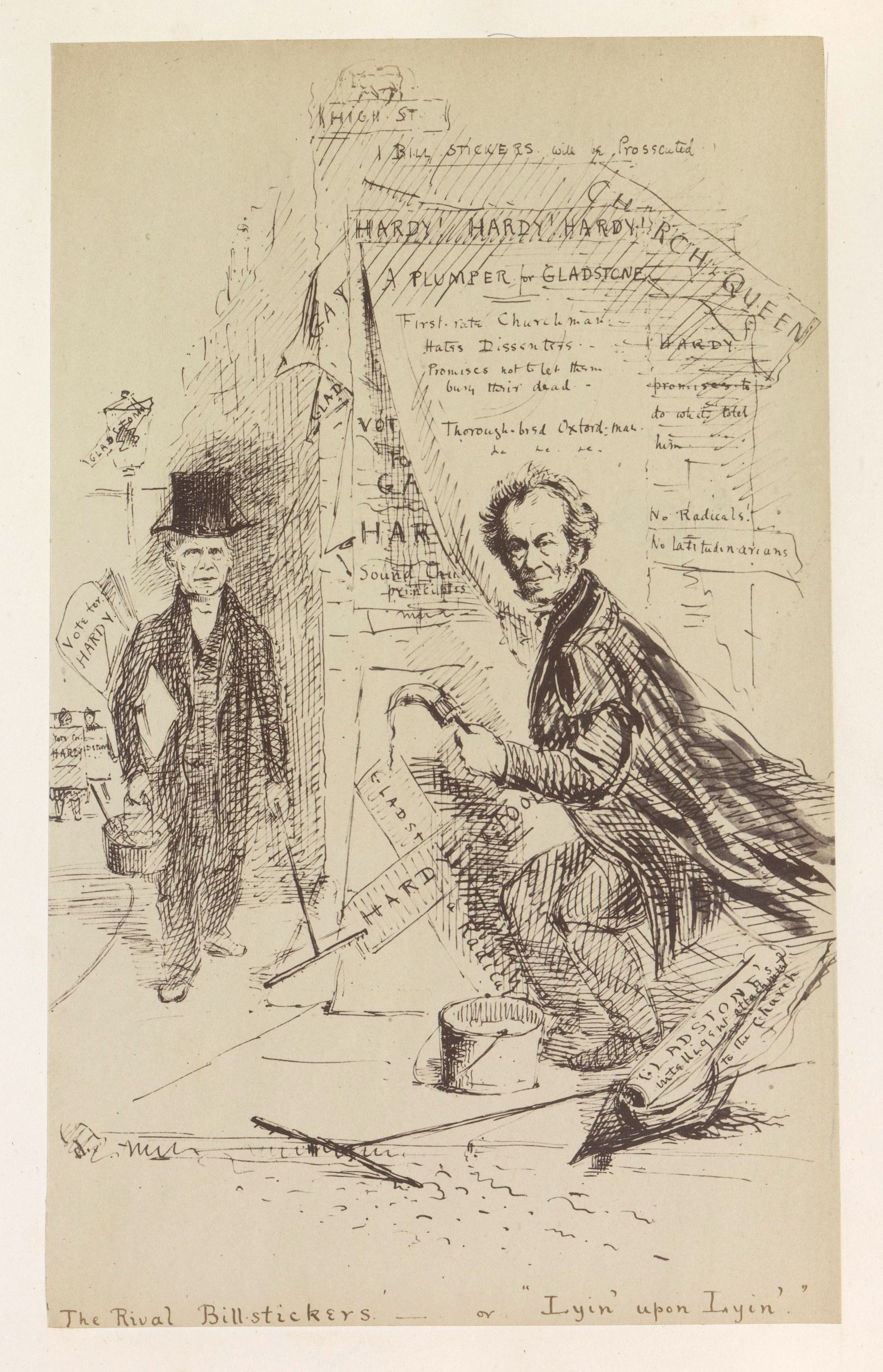
Caricature of Charles Clerke and William Jacobson

Charles Carr Clerke (30 December 1798 – 24 December 1877) was Archdeacon of Oxford from 9 March 1830, until his death. He also served as rector of Milton, Berkshire (now in Oxfordshire) from 1836 to 1875, Canon of Christ Church from 1845 until his death, and Sub-Dean of Christ Church from 1853 until his death.

The son of Sir William Henry Clerke, he was educated at Christ Church, Oxford, matriculating in 1814 at age 15; and graduating B.A. in 1818, M.A. in 1821, B.D. in 1830, canon and D.D. 1847. He was the author of a large number of visitation sermons and addresses, as well as devotional texts and treatises on ecclesiastical law. Clerke was a sponsor of the Library of the Fathers.
