= Ronny Krippner =

British organist

Ronny Krippner is a German-born British organist, conductor, teacher and composer who currently serves as Director of Music at Ripon Cathedral.

== Early career and education ==
Krippner was born and educated in Marktredwitz, Germany, and studied organ with Alois Fischer (Waldsassen) and composition, harmony and counterpoint with Eberhard Kraus (Regensburg) and Wolfram Graf (Bayreuth). He graduated in Kirchenmusik (church music studies) from the Hochschule für Katholische Kirchenmusik und Musikpädagogik in Regensburg, where he studied organ and organ improvisation with Franz Josef Stoiber, piano with Norbert Brandstetter and orchestral conducting with Graham Buckland.

During his time in Germany, Krippner held a number of organist and director of music positions. From 1995 to 1999, he was Chorregent at the Catholic Herz-Jesu-Kirche in Marktredwitz, then Kantor at the Lutheran Maria-Magdalena-Kirche in Arzberg until 2002 and Kirchenmusiker at the Catholic St. Albertus-Magnus-Kirche in Regensburg. From 2001 to 2004, he was also assistant choirmaster of the Regensburger Domspatzen (Regensburg Cathedral Choir).

Krippner moved to England in 2004 to take up the post of choral scholar at Exeter Cathedral whilst studying for an MA in English Cathedral Music at Exeter University. In 2005, he moved to Bristol to study for a PGCE in Secondary Music at Bristol University, whilst being organ scholar at Bristol Cathedral and organist at Clifton College. In 2019, Krippner was awarded a PhD by Birmingham City University for a thesis entitled 'Organ Improvisation in the Anglican Cathedral Tradition: A Professional Portfolio with Critical and Contextual Comments'.

== Career ==
After a brief period as assistant organist at Newport Cathedral, South Wales, and teacher of music at Bristol Grammar School, Krippner moved to London where he became organist and teacher of music at King’s College School, Wimbledon, and Assistant Director of Music at St George’s Church, Hanover Square.

From 2013 to 2021 Krippner served as organist and Director of Music at Croydon Minster, and in January 2022 he was appointed Director of Music at Ripon Cathedral.

As a concert artist, Krippner has performed throughout the UK, as well as in Europe, Australia and Mexico. He is particularly noted as an expert organ improviser, having won accolades at international organ improvisation competitions (e.g. St Albans, Biarritz). Past positions include teaching organ improvisation at the Royal Birmingham Conservatoire and Trinity Laban Conservatoire of Music and Dance, London. He regularly contributes to German and British music magazines on the subject of choral and organ music and teaches organ on various music courses (e.g. RCO, Oundle School, London Organ Improvisation Course).

In recognition of his artistic work, Krippner was awarded the Kulturförderpreis by Marktredwitz Council (1998) and the Sudetendeutsche Kulturpreis (2018).

=== Broadcast and film work ===
Krippner has performed for broadcasts on BBC One, BBC Radio 3, BBC Radio 4, Classic FM and Bayerischer Rundfunk (Bavarian Broadcasting Corporation).

He also co-wrote and presented the documentary Ex Tempore – Organ Improvisation in England, a film that sheds light on the development of English organ improvisation from 1500 to the present day – Thomas Tallis, William Byrd, Henry Purcell, George Frideric Handel, Charles Villiers Stanford, Herbert Howells, William Mathias and Kenneth Leighton. For each composer, Krippner sketches their musical background and analyses their compositional techniques before performing a full improvisation in their style. The organs he plays are carefully chosen to present the different musical styles at their best. They include big cathedral organs in Bristol and Liverpool to smaller historical instruments at Little Stanmore and Adlington Hall. This film was produced by Fugue State Films and released in 2011 on DVD with an accompanying CD with recordings by Ronny Krippner of stylistic organ improvisations. At the time of its release it was reviewed in the BBC Music Magazine as follows: “A phenomenal improviser… Ex Tempore is a fascinating insight into a neglected art."

In July 2017, Krippner recorded a CD of organ music from the former Kingdom of Bohemia on historical organs in St. Anna in Planá, Dreifaltigkeitskirche Kappl near Waldsassen and St. Nicolas in Cheb, featuring music by Franz Johann Habermann, Johann Caspar Ferdinand Fischer and improvisations on music by Johann Hagius and Jobst vom Brandt.

== Discography ==
Partial discography:

- Christmas at Ripon Cathedral (Priory, 2024)
- Orgelmusik aus Böhmen – gespielt auf historischen Orgeln des Egerlandes (Ambiente Audio, 2017)
- The Tudor Choir Book Vol 1: Croydon Minster Choir of Whitgift School & English Cornett and Sackbut Ensemble (Convivium Records, 2017)
- Christmas Carols from Croydon Minster (Regent, 2014)
- Ex Tempore – The Art of Organ Improvisation in England (Fugue State Films, 2011)

Preceded by Paul Ayres	Assistant Director of Music, St George's Church, Hanover Square; 2008 – 2013	Succeeded by Robin Walker
Preceded by Andrew Cantrill	Organist and Director of Music, Croydon Minster; 2013 – 2021	Succeeded by Justin Miller
Preceded by Peter Wright (acting)	Director of Music, Ripon Cathedral; 2022 – present	Succeeded by
