= Simon Lole =

Choral director and organist (born 1957)

Simon Lole (b 23 December 1957) is a choral director, organist, composer, arranger and broadcaster. He was organist of Barking Parish Church (1978–80), Croydon Parish Church (1980–85), Director of Music at St Mary's Church, Warwick (1985–94) before becoming Organist and Director of Music at Sheffield Cathedral (1994–1997) and then at Salisbury Cathedral (1997–2005), He spent two periods as Acting Director of Chapel Music at Jesus College, Cambridge (2006 and 2009). He has composed over 60 published works. Best known are "The Father's Love" (RSCM), "The Journey" (RSCM), "I am the bread of life" (RSCM),"Shall we not Love Thee, Mother dear?" (RSCM), "The St David's Service" (Encore), Angels (Banks) and "Jesu, the very thought of Thee" (OUP). Much of his music has been recorded and broadcast on radio and TV. He is now Director of Music at St Mary's Church, Swanage.

He was educated at King's College London (BMus, 1978) and the Guildhall School of Music.

As an arranger, Lole is much in demand, and produces a lot of music for the BBC for whom he is a regular musical director and organist. He regularly appears as musical director for BBC Radio 4's "Daily Service" as well as being vocal coach and accompanist for the annual BBC Young Chorister of the Year competition. He regularly works in the crossover musical field as musical director and arranger for many artists including Aled Jones, Hayley Westenra, All Angels, Camilla Kerslake, Blake and The Choirgirl Isabel. Recently he has also been arranging, orchestrating and conducting for the rock band, Archive. Lole is a regular choral workshop leader, directing festivals across the UK, US, Europe and South Africa. He is also becoming known as a presenter on BBC Radio, working on "Pause for Thought", "The Early Music Show" and "The Choir".

He is married with two daughters and a son.

== See also ==
- Salisbury Cathedral
- Salisbury Cathedral School

Cultural offices
Preceded by David Brookshaw	Organist and Director of Music, Croydon Parish Church; 1980-1985	Succeeded by Carl Jackson
Preceded by Paul Brough	Organist of Sheffield Cathedral; 1994-1997	Succeeded by Neil Taylor
Preceded by Richard Seal	Organist of Salisbury Cathedral; 1997-2005	Succeeded by David Halls
