= Judy French =

British Anglican priest

The Reverend Judy French
- Archdeacon of Dorchester
- Church: Church of England
- Diocese: Diocese of Oxford
- In office: 2014–2022
- Other posts: Vicar of Charlbury with Shorthampton (1997 to 2014); Area Dean of Chipping Norton (2007 to 2012)

Orders
- Ordination: 1991 (deacon); 1994 (priest)

Personal details
- Born: Judith Karen French; 18 November 1960 (age 65)
- Denomination: Anglicanism
- Education: St David's College, Lampeter; St Stephen's House, Oxford

Judith Karen French (called Judy; born 18 November 1960) is a British retired Anglican priest. From 2014 to 2022, she was the Archdeacon of Dorchester in the Diocese of Oxford.

French was educated at a United Reformed Church boarding school, studied theology at St David's College, Lampeter, and trained for ordination at St Stephen's House, Oxford. She served as a parish deacon in the Diocese of Portsmouth (1991–1994), and as an assistant curate in the Diocese of Coventry (1994–1997). She was a Vicar in the Diocese of Oxford from 1997 until her appointment as Archdeacon; during this incumbency, she also served as Area Dean of Chipping Norton (2007–2012). In 2012, she was made an Honorary Canon of Christ Church Cathedral.

== Early life and education ==
French was born on 18 November 1960 in Portsmouth, Hampshire, England. She spent her childhood living in England, Kenya and the Middle East, as the family moved during her father's career as a telecom engineer. Her mother was a Sunday school teacher. She was educated at an English "boarding school that was originally set up for the daughters of United Reformed Church ministers". She therefore originally attended a URC church with her school, but soon began attending the local Church of England church. She was confirmed at the age of 14, having attended the church near her grandparents’ home in Portsmouth for preparation.

After finishing school, French moved to Portsmouth where she began working as an accounts clerk at an insurance firm. She became a member of the church she was confirmed at which was a "middle of the road church with an Anglo-Catholic vicar". She joined its parochial church council (PCC) at the age of 19.

After completing a history A-Level at night school, French became the first member of her family to attend university when she took up a place to study theology at St David's College, Lampeter in Wales. During her time at Lampeter, the university chaplain was a woman and there had been female deacons in the Church in Wales since 1980. She felt the call to ordination while at university. She graduated with a Bachelor of Arts (BA) degree in 1989. She was selected for ordination in the Church of England, and matriculated into St Stephen's House, Oxford, an Anglo-Catholic theological college, in 1989. She was one of only two women in her year, but became the only woman when the other left shortly after starting her studies. After two years of training, she left St Stephen's House to be ordained as a deacon.

== Ordained ministry ==
French was ordained in the Church of England as a deacon in 1991. From 1991 to 1994, she was parish deacon at All Saints Church, Botley in the Diocese of Portsmouth. As then Bishop of Portsmouth, Timothy Bavin, was conflicted about women priests, she would have to move dioceses to join the priesthood.

French was ordained as a priest in 1994, the first year that woman were ordained to the priesthood in the Church of England, during a service at Coventry Cathedral. From 1994 to 1997, she served as an assistant curate at St Mark's Church, Bilton in the Diocese of Coventry; St Mark's is in the broad church tradition but had an Evangelical vicar at the time.

In 1997, French was appointed Vicar of St Mary the Virgin, Charlbury in the Diocese of Oxford; this made her the first female incumbent in the Dorchester Episcopal Area. She was also Area Dean of Chipping Norton between 2007 and 2012. She was made an Honorary Canon of Christ Church Cathedral in 2012. In March 2014, she was announced as the first Archdeacon of Dorchester, an appointment created by the division of the Archdeaconry of Oxford. She led her last service as vicar on 25 May after 17 years in the role. On 19 June 2014, she was collated as archdeacon during a service at Christ Church Cathedral. She retired effective 30 September 2022, after eight years as archdeacon. Her farewell service was held at Dorchester Abbey on 25 September 2022.
