= Lakewood Heights =

Lakewood Heights may refer to:

- Lakewood Heights (Atlanta), a neighborhood and historic district of Atlanta, Georgia, United States
- Lakewood Heights, Dallas, a neighborhood of Dallas, Texas, United States

== See also ==
- Lakewood Heights School, an elementary school in New Brunswick School District 08, Canada
- Lakewood (disambiguation)
