= Carl Jackson (organist) =

British organist (born 1958)

Carl Anthony Jackson MVO (born 1958) is a British organist and music administrator. He was formerly director of music at the Chapel Royal, Hampton Court.

== Biography ==
Jackson grew up in Harrow, London. His father worked as an ATSEP at London Heathrow Airport, then at London Air Traffic Control Centre. His mother, originally from Saint Ann's Bay, Jamaica, was a magistrate and nursing education tutor. He attended Harrow County School for Boys between 1970 and 1977, which he combined with studies as a Junior Exhibitioner at the Royal Academy of Music. After a gap-year at the Academy, he then read music at Downing College, Cambridge where he served as organ scholar between 1978 and 1981. His teachers included Malcolm Hill, Alan Harverson and Peter Hurford. After graduating in music from Cambridge, he moved on to Goldsmiths' College where he obtained a teaching qualification. From 1986 to 1990 he was organist and director of music at Croydon Parish Church (now Croydon Minster).

Jackson became director of music at the Chapel Royal, Hampton Court in 1996, following the death of Gordon Reynolds the previous year. Jackson retired from this role at the end of August 2025, after 29 years of service.

Cultural offices
Preceded by Simon Lole	Organist and Director of Music, Croydon Parish Church; 1986–1990	Succeeded by David Swinson
Preceded by Gordon Reynolds	Director of Music, Chapel Royal, Hampton Court; 1996–2025	Succeeded by Alexander Hamilton
