= William Bridges (priest) =

English Anglican priest

William Bridges (1579–1626) was an English Anglican priest in the 17th century.

Rye was born in Middlesex and educated at New College, Oxford. He was appointed Archdeacon of Oxford in 1614 and held the position until his death.
