= John Drewry =

English Anglican priest

John Drewery, DCL was an English Anglican priest in the late 16th and early 17th centuries.

Drewry was born in Pulborough and educated at Lincoln College, Oxford. He held livings at Pulborough and Witney. He was appointed a Canon of Chichester Cathedral in 1582 and Archdeacon of Oxford in 1592. Drewry died on 9 June 1614.
