= Andrew Cantrill =

British-born organist and choral director

Andrew Cantrill-Fenwick is a British-born organist and choral director. He has held cathedral positions in New Zealand and the United States, and was organist of the Royal Hospital School, Holbrook, Suffolk until September 2018. He is a Fellow, prize-winner and former Trustee Council member of the Royal College of Organists, and a Fellow of the Royal Society of Arts. He is a tutor for the RCO Academy Organ School, an examiner for the Associated Board of the Royal Schools of Music, an active recitalist, and a sought-after broadcaster, writer and presenter.

== Education ==
Andrew Cantrill was a music scholar at Reigate Grammar School, and organ scholar at Barnard Castle School. He studied music at Durham University, where he was organ scholar of the College of St Hild and St Bede, conductor of the University Chamber Choir and Chamber Orchestra, and assistant conductor of the University Choral Society. He graduated in 1991 with the Eve Myra Kisch Prize for Music. His organ teachers have included James Lancelot, Peter Wright, Susi Jeans and Gerre Hancock.

== Career ==
He has been assistant organist of Hampstead Parish Church, Master of the Choristers at Grimsby Minster, Director of Music at Saint Paul's Cathedral, Wellington, New Zealand, Organist-Choirmaster at St Paul's Cathedral, Buffalo, New York, US, and Organist & Master of the Choristers at Croydon Minster, London.

During his time in New Zealand, Andrew Cantrill was Musical Director of Orpheus Choir of Wellington, with whom he conducted both Orchestra Wellington and the New Zealand Symphony Orchestra. He was tutor in organ at the Massey University Conservatorium of Music, and appeared regularly on Radio NZ's Concert FM as organ soloist, accompanist and presenter. In recent years, his articles on organ performance have appeared in Organists' Review and Cathedral Music, and he has lectured for the Royal College of Organists and Incorporated Association of Organists. He appears as a presenter in videos on the iRCO website, introducing players to the organ and to improvisation.

At the Royal Hospital School he was responsible for the famed 4-manual Hill, Norman & Beard Grand Organ of 1933. The instrument has a British Institute of Organ Studies Grade 1 Historic Organ listing, and was regularly heard in the many chapel services and concerts.

As a recitalist, Cantrill has played in many celebrated British, European, American and Australasian venues.

Preceded by Philip Walsh	Organist & Director of Music, Saint Paul's Cathedral, Wellington; 1999 – 2004	Succeeded by Michael Fulcher
Preceded by Dale Adelmann	Organist-Choirmaster, St. Paul's Cathedral (Buffalo, New York); 2004 – 2007	Succeeded by Jeremy Bruns
Preceded by Nigel McClintock	Organist and Master of the Choristers, Croydon Minster; 2008 – 2012	Succeeded by Ronny Krippner
