= Croydon Minster =

Coordinates: 51.3727°N 0.1061°W

- The Minster Church of St John Baptist at Croydon
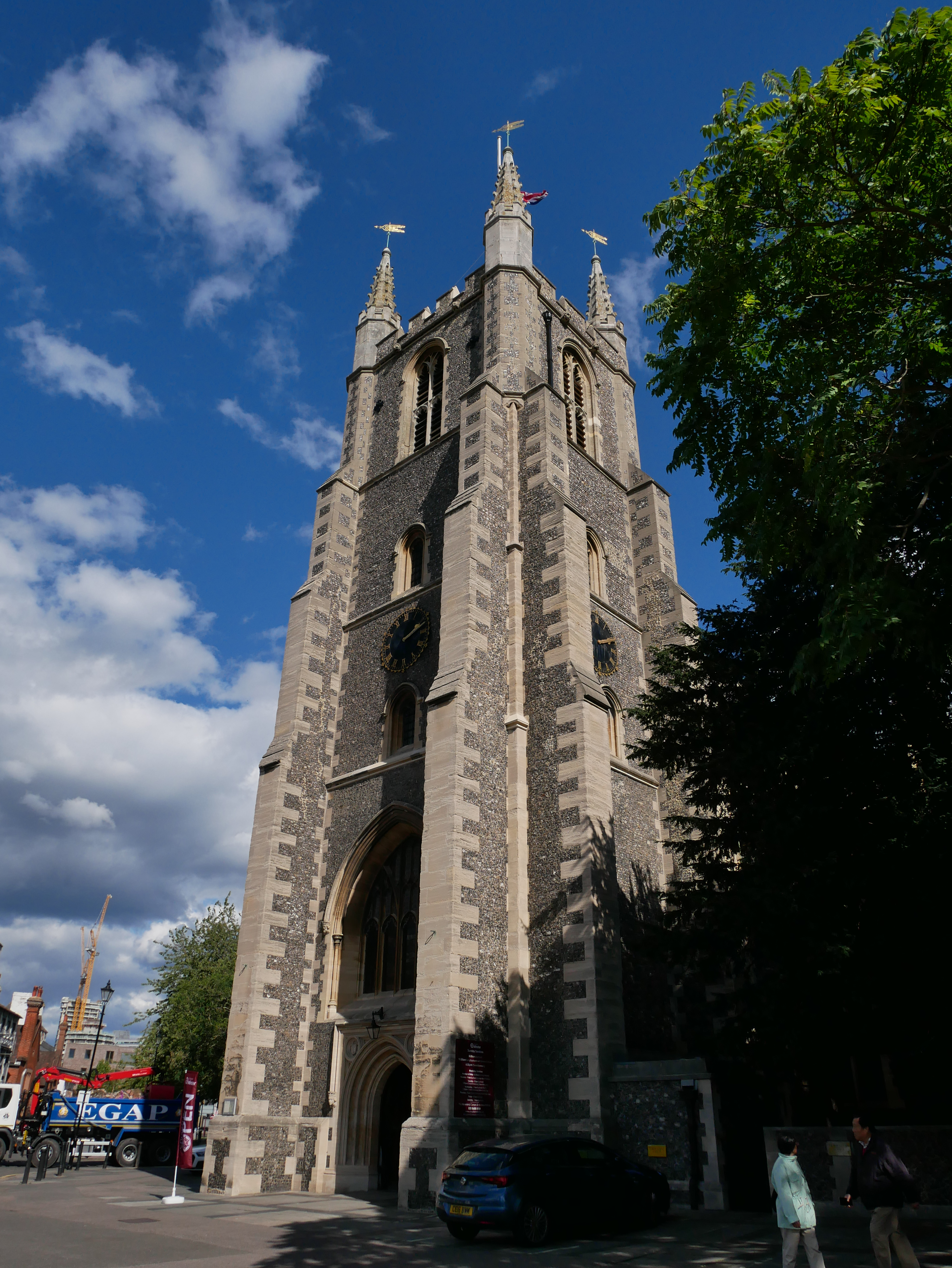
- Croydon Minster from the southwest
- Croydon Minster
- Location: Old Town, Croydon
- Country: England
- Denomination: Church of England
- Previous denomination: Catholic
- Churchmanship: Liberal Catholic
- Website: http://www.croydonminster.org/

History
- Dedication: John the Baptist

Architecture
- Style: English Gothic

Administration
- Diocese: Diocese of Southwark
- Archdeaconry: Croydon archdeaconry
- Deanery: Croydon Central deanery
- Parish: Croydon

Clergy
- Vicar: Andrew Bishop

Croydon Minster is the parish and civic church of the London Borough of Croydon, located in the Old Town area of Croydon. There are currently more than 35 churches in the borough, with Croydon Minster being the most prominent. It is Grade I listed.

Six Archbishops of Canterbury are buried in the church: Edmund Grindal (d.1583), John Whitgift (d.1604), Gilbert Sheldon (d.1677), William Wake (d.1737), John Potter (d.1747), and Thomas Herring (d.1757).

== History ==
=== Medieval church ===
The church was established in the middle Saxon period, and is believed to have been a minster church: one which served as a base for a group of clergy living a communal life, who may have taken some pastoral responsibility for the population of the surrounding district. A charter issued by King Coenwulf of Mercia refers to a council which had taken place close to what is called the monasterium (meaning minster) of Croydon. An Anglo-Saxon will made in about 960 is witnessed by Elfsies, priest of Croydon; and the church is also mentioned in the Domesday Book of 1086.

The earliest clear record of the church's dedication to St John the Baptist is found in the will of John de Croydon, fishmonger, dated 6 December 1347, which includes a bequest to "the church of S. John de Croydon".

In its final medieval form, the church was mainly a Perpendicular-style structure of late 14th and early 15th-century date. It still bears the arms of archbishops Courtenay and Chichele, believed to have been its benefactors.

=== Destruction and rebuilding ===
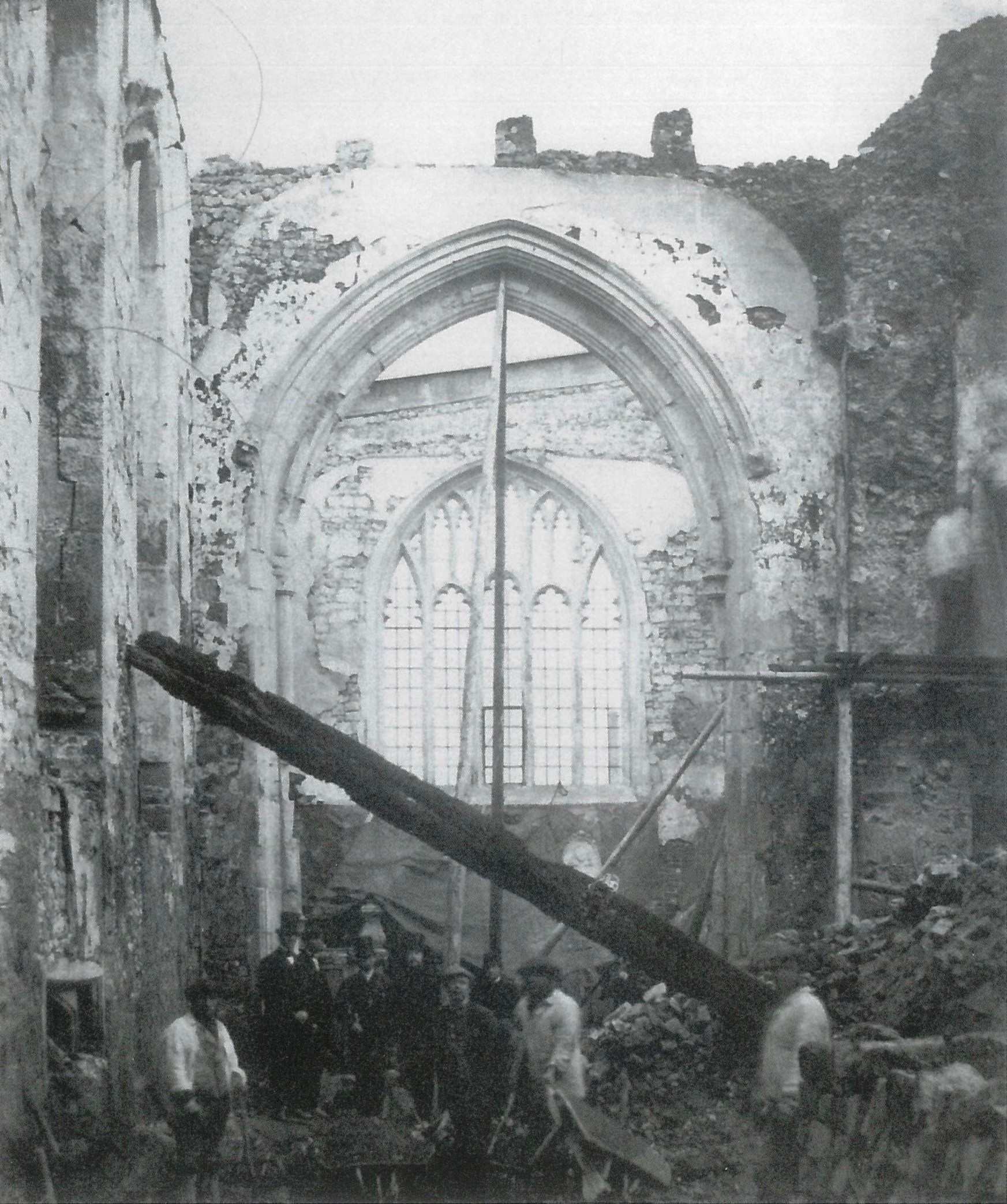
The ruins of the church, following its destruction in 1867: the north chancel aisle looking east

The medieval building underwent some restoration in 1851 and 1857–9, under the direction of George Gilbert Scott. On the night of 5 January 1867, a fire broke out – possibly caused by overheating of the poorly positioned flues of recently installed Gurney stoves – which eventually gutted the entire building. It was rebuilt to Scott's designs between 1867 and 1869, incorporating some of the medieval remains (notably the west tower and south porch), and essentially following the medieval plan, while enlarging the building by extending its footprint further east. During the period of rebuilding, services were held in a temporary "iron church", with seating for 1,000, erected in April 1867 in Scarbrook Road.

The church's reconsecration by Archbishop Archibald Tait took place on 5 January 1870. The church still contains several important monuments and fittings saved from the old building.

=== Present day ===
The church was elevated to the status of Croydon Minster (the modern honorific title) on 29 May 2011, the first such change in the diocese of Southwark.

Croydon has strong religious links, Croydon Palace having been a residence of the Archbishop of Canterbury from at least the beginning of the 13th century to the beginning of the 19th. The Bishop of Croydon is a position as an area bishop in the Anglican Diocese of Southwark. The current area bishop is Jonathan Clark, who was consecrated on 21 March 2012. Until recently (mid 2016) the vicar was Colin J. Luke Boswell, Vicar of Croydon and Chaplain to the Whitgift Foundation.

Croydon Minster today de facto serves as Whitgift School's chapel. It is also linked to The Minster Schools.

The Minster stands in the inclusive liberal catholic tradition of the Church of England.

== Organ ==
The church has a large four-manual pipe organ, much of which is by William Hill & Sons and dates from 1869. There is also a small organ in the St Nicholas Chapel which was obtained from St Mary the Virgin, Preston Candover in 1997.

== Organists and Masters of Choristers ==
Before the fire of 1867 records are incomplete, but include:

- Thomas Attwood Walmisley 1830–1833
- John Pyke Hullah 1837–?

After the fire of 1867:

- John Rhodes 1857–1868
- Frederick Cambridge 1868–1911
- F. Rowland Tims 1911–1918
- H. Leslie Smith 1918–1948
- Edward Shakespeare 1948–1952
- J. A. Rogans (Hon) 1952–1953
- B. Aldersea 1952–1957
- J. A. Rogans (Hon) 1957–1958
- Derek Holman 1958–1965
- Roy Massey 1965–1968
- Michael Fleming 1968–1978
- David Brookshaw 1978–1980
- Simon Lole 1980–1985
- Carl Jackson 1986–1990
- David Swinson 1990–1992
- Peter Nardone 1993–2000
- Nigel McClintock 2000–2007
- Andrew Cantrill 2008–2012
- Tom Little (Acting) 2012–2013
- Dr Ronny Krippner 2013–2021
- Sophie Garbisu (Acting) 2021–2022
- Justin Miller 2022–

Organists Laureate

- Martin How 2011–2022

Organists Emeritus

- Derek Holman 2011–2019
- Roy Massey 2011–

== Bells ==
The tower houses a ring of 12 bells cast by the Croydon firm of Gillett & Johnston in 1936, replacing an earlier ring of eight. The eight original bells were recast and hung with new fittings in a new frame with four additional trebles. The new ring of 12 was dedicated by the Bishop of Croydon on 12 December 1936 and the first peal on the new 12 was rung for the coronation of King George VI and Queen Elizabeth in 1937.

The tower and ringers are affiliated to the Surrey Association of Church Bell Ringers.

== St John’s Memorial Garden ==
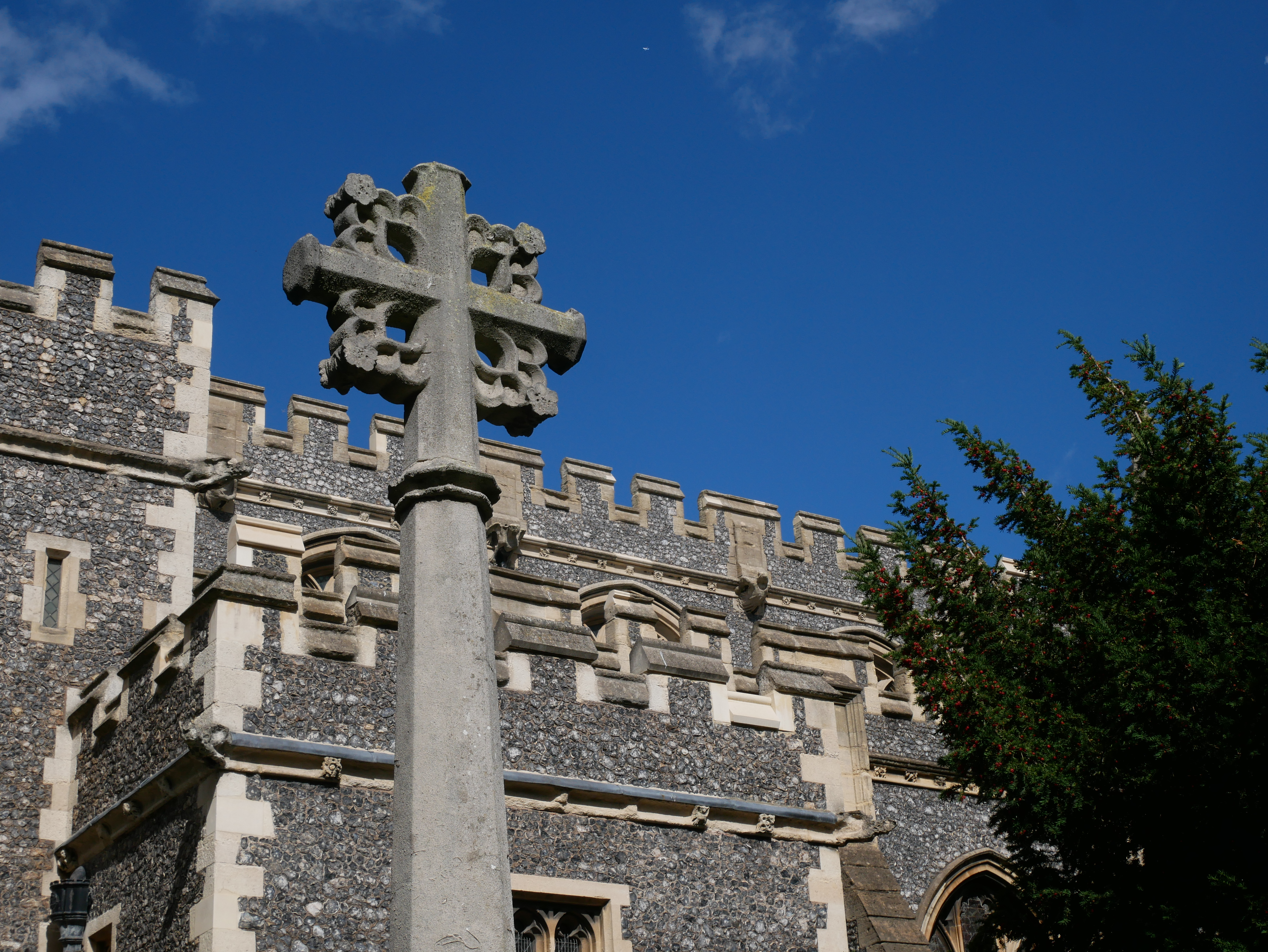
The war memorial in St John’s Memorial Garden, unveiled in 1922

To the south of the Minster is St John’s Memorial Garden, an area of 2 acres (0.81 ha). Up until 1957 it was a traditional cemetery which was no longer used and had become neglected. Earlier gravestones and tombs were relocated or used for walling or paving and a War Memorial was also repositioned.

== Gallery ==
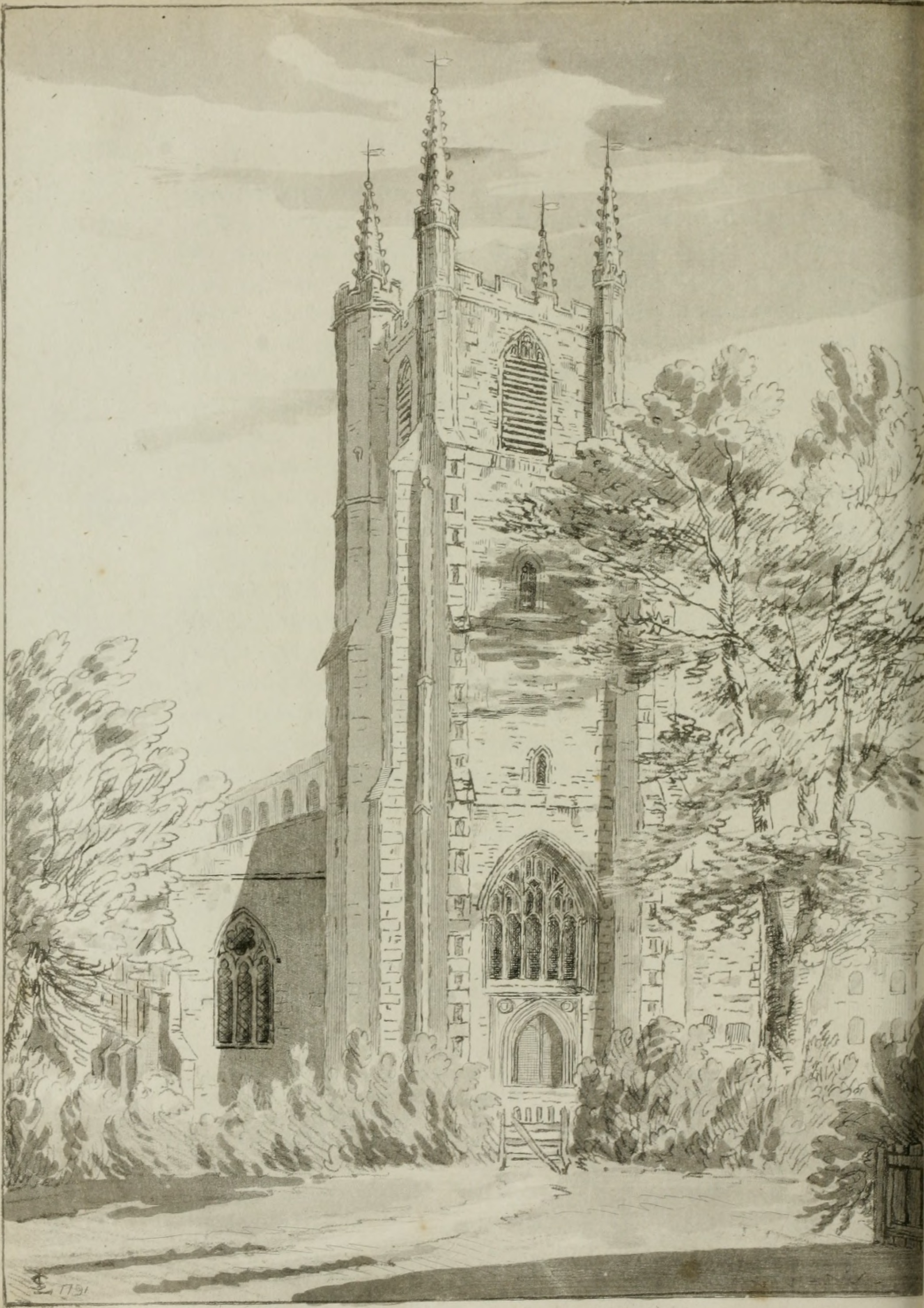
The west tower in 1792

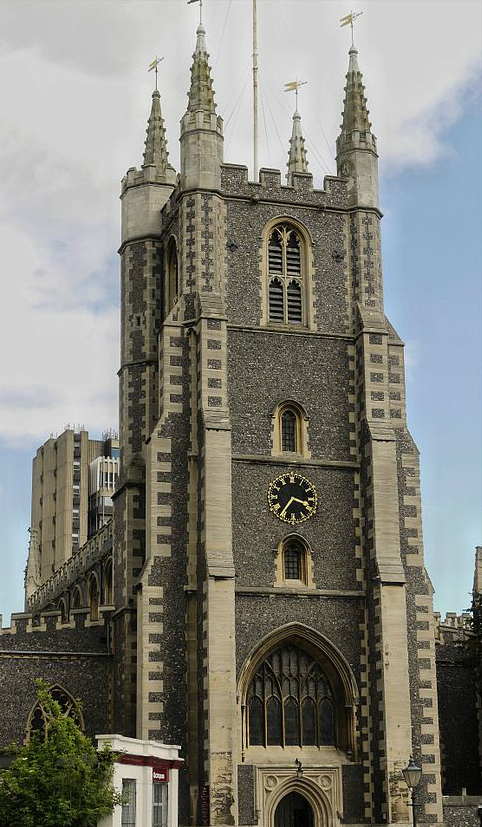
The west tower

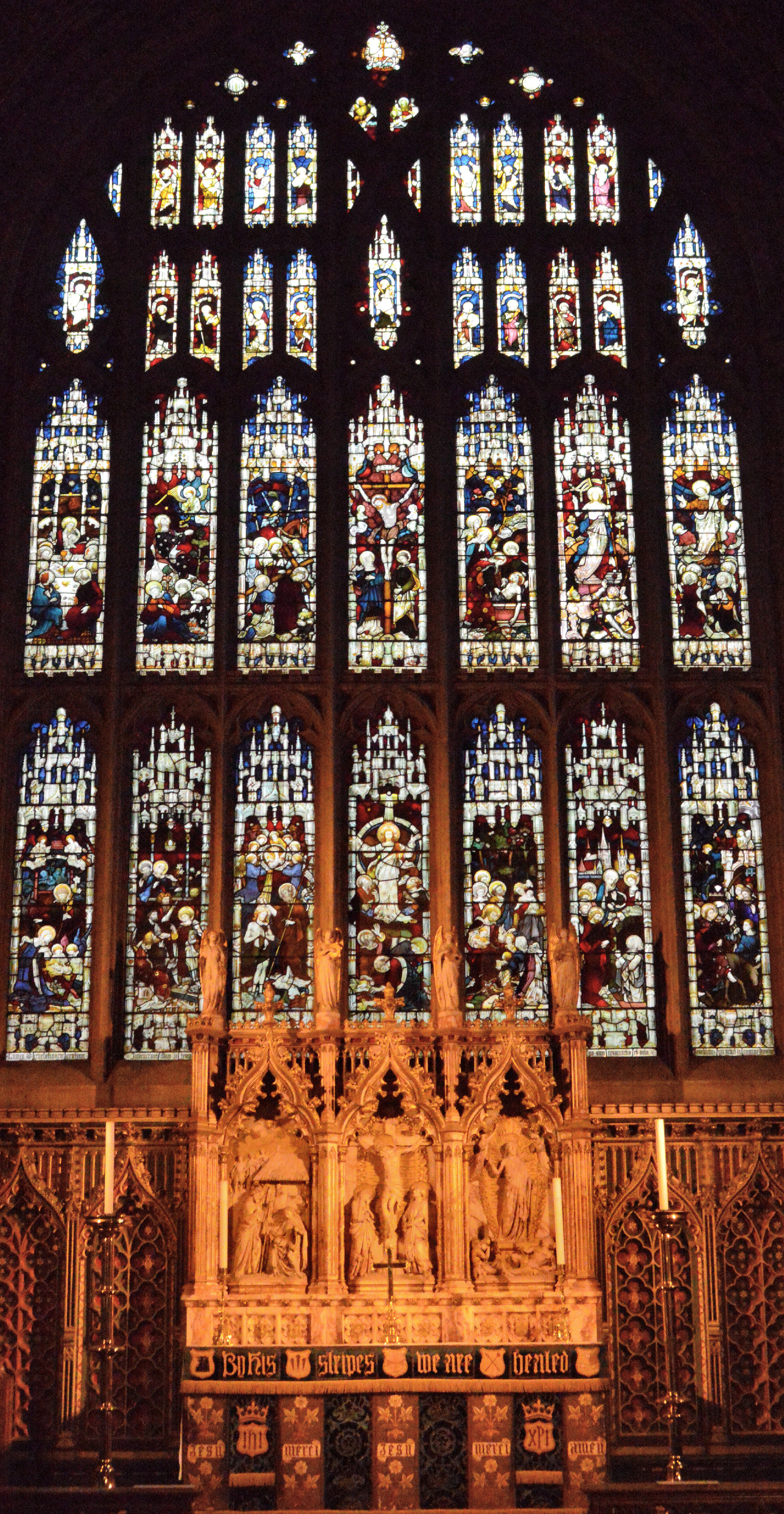
Altar and East window

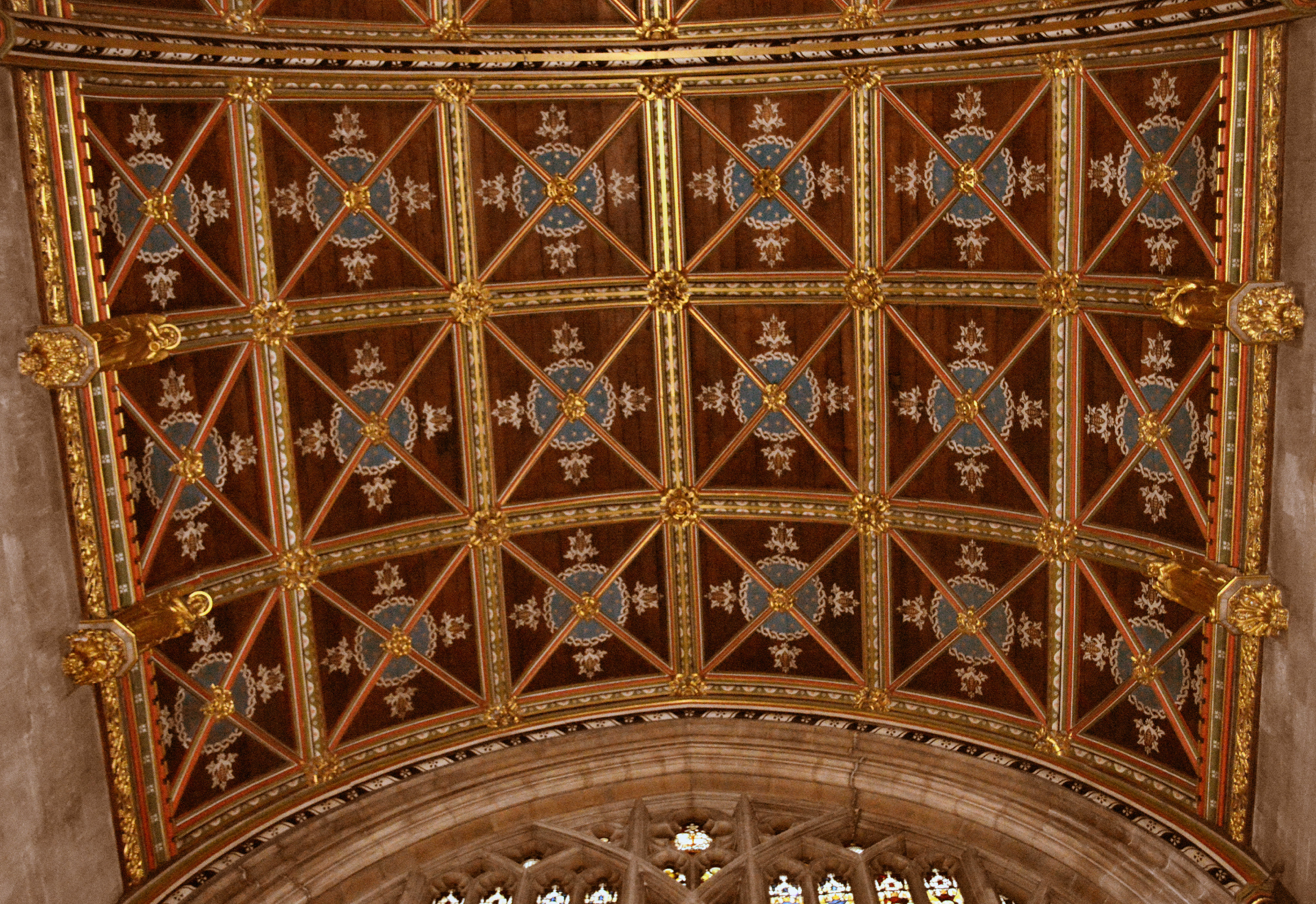
The carved, painted and gilded barrel-vaulted ceiling

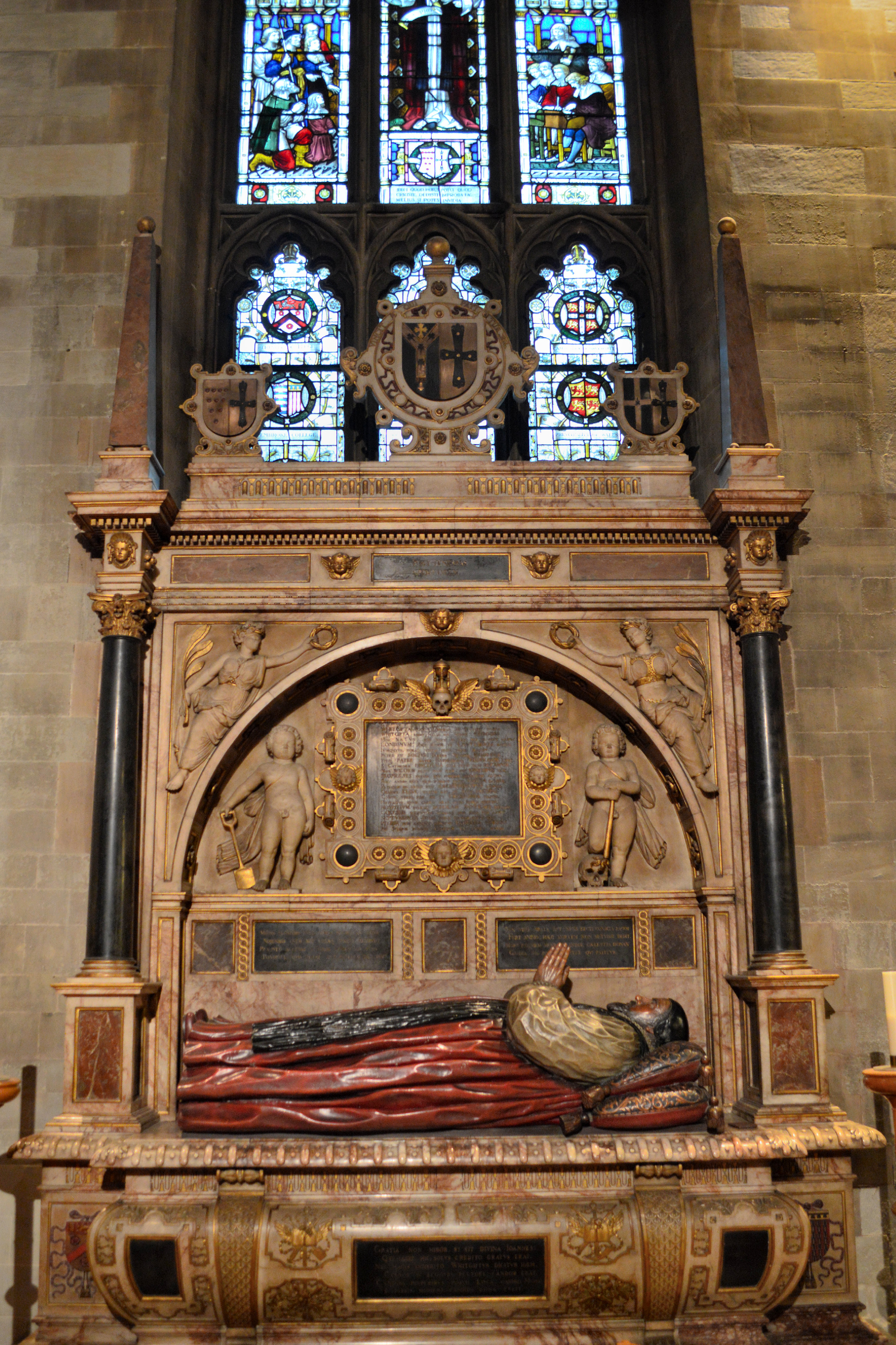
Tomb of Archbishop John Whitgift

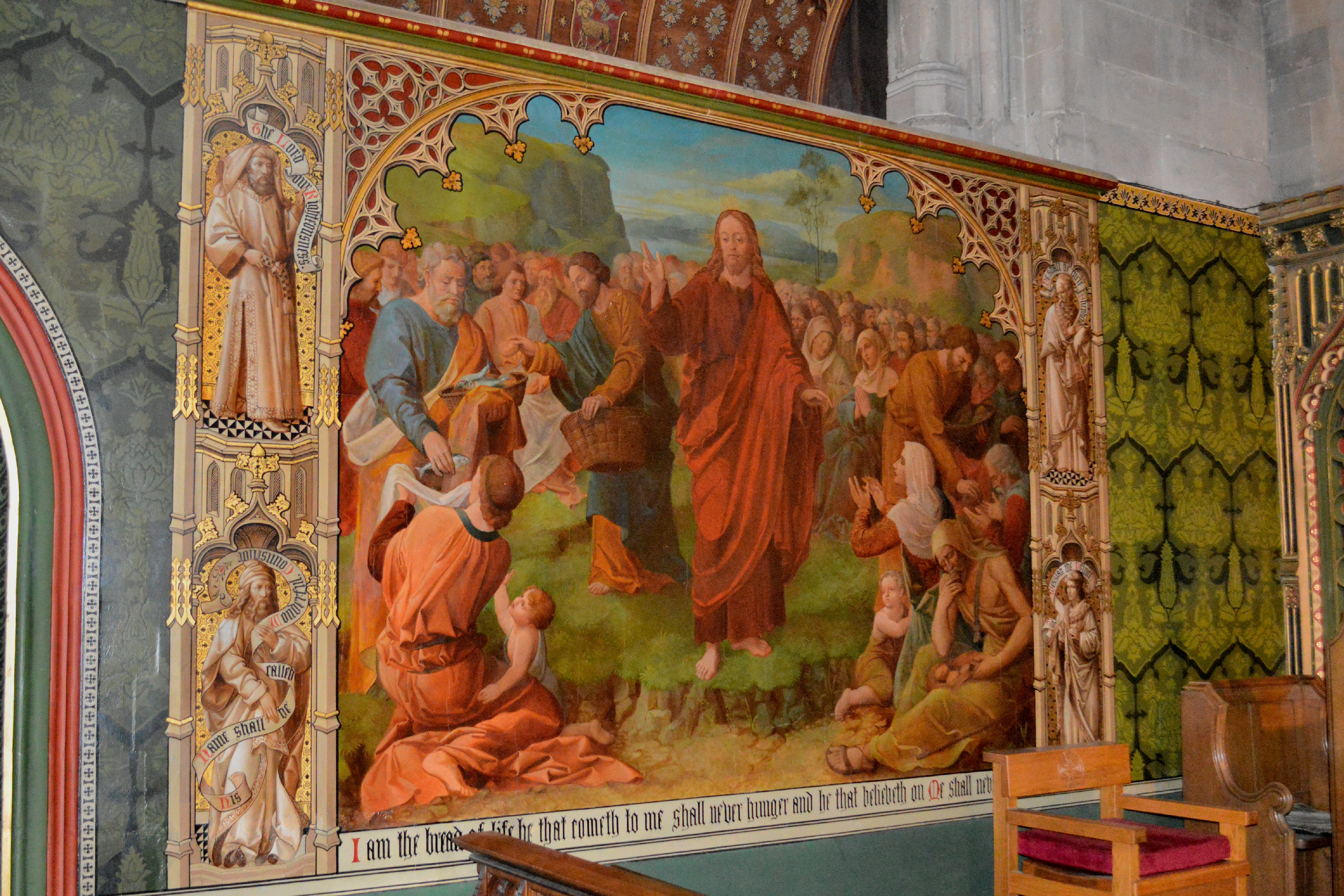
Feeding of the Five Thousand
