= Phineas Pett (priest) =

Phineas Pett, D.D. (b Maidstone 1 June 1756 – d Christ Church, Oxford 4 February 1830) was Archdeacon of Oxford from 1797 until his death.

Pett was educated at Christ Church, Oxford, matriculating in 1774, and graduating B.A. in 1778. He held livings at Orton on the Hill, Cropredy, Wentnor, Chilbolton and Newington, Oxfordshire. He was Principal of St Mary Hall, Oxford from 1801 until 1815.
