= Belview Heights Historic District =

Historic district in Alabama, United States

- U.S. National Register of Historic Places
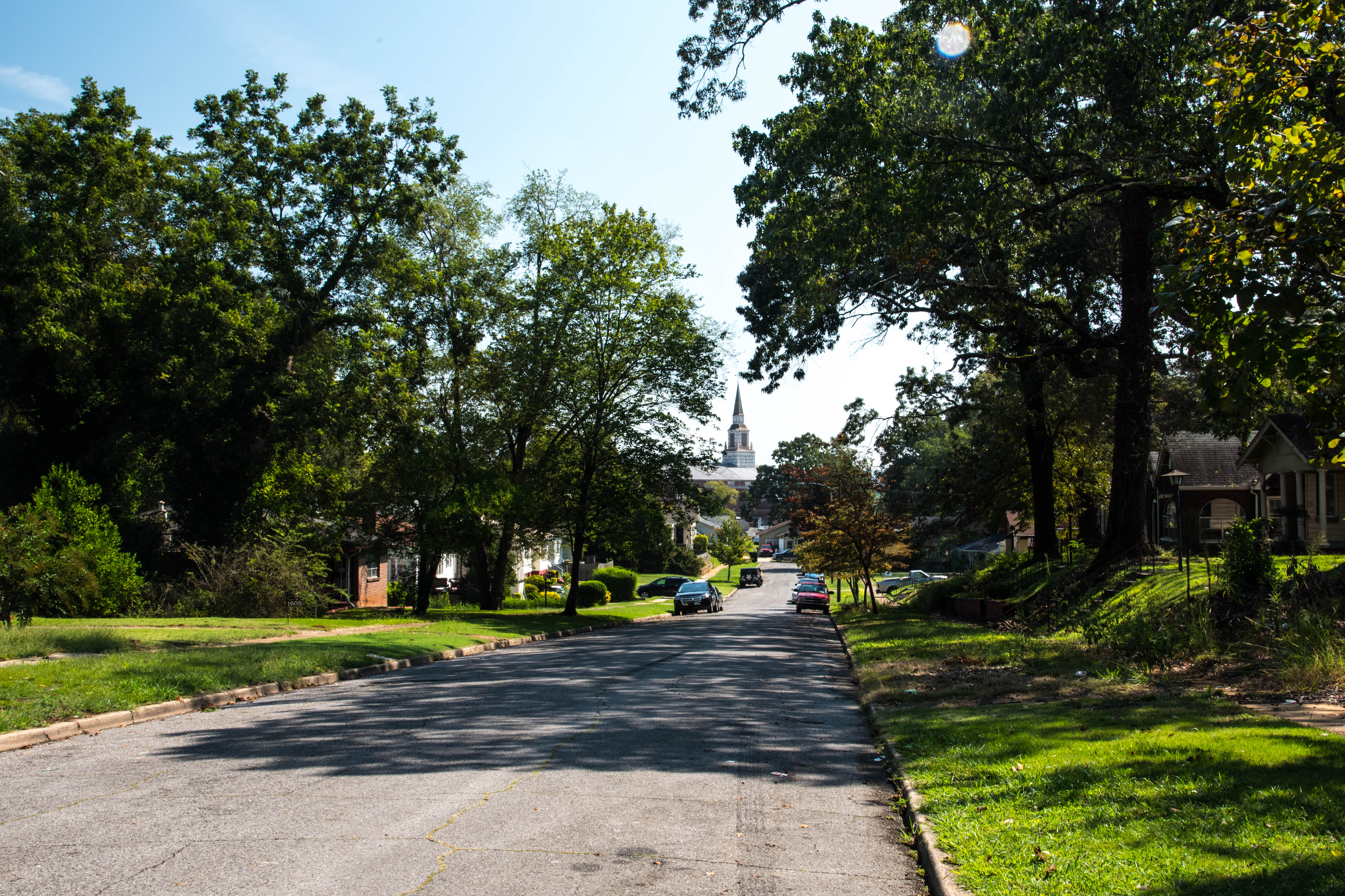

- Location within Alabama
- Location: Roughly along 41st., 42st., 43rd., 44th, and 45th Sts., and M and Martin Aves., Birmingham, Alabama
- Coordinates: 33°29′26″N 86°53′28″W
- Area: 150 acres (0.61 km^{2})
- Architect: George Turner
- Architectural style: Bungalow/craftsman, Tudor Revival, other
- NRHP reference No.: 00000713
- Added to NRHP: June 22, 2000

The Belview Heights Historic District, in Birmingham, Alabama, United States, is a historic district which was listed on the National Register of Historic Places in 2000. It runs roughly along 41st, 42nd, 43rd, 44th, and 45th Streets, and M and Martin Avenues. The listing included 355 contributing buildings on 150 acres (0.61 km^{2}).

It includes 20 of the original 30 square blocks of Belview Heights, a neighborhood developed in the former town of Ensley, Alabama.

The district has "an impressive assemblage of architectural styles popular in residential suburbs throughout the United States in the first half of the 20th century" and in particular "boasts one of the largest saturations of Tudor Revival architecture in Birmingham, reflecting the popularity of that particular style from the 1920s through the 1940s. The district contains examples of Colonial and Spanish Revival, American Foursquare, minimal traditional, and ranch houses as well as a large number of Bungalow/Craftsman dwellings. Of the 423 resources located in the historic district, 154 can be classified as Tudor Revival-style."

It includes two non-residential buildings:

- Central Park Fire Station #24 (c.1915), 1644 44th Street, Tudor Revival in style, a common bond brick and steel two-story building noted as "an excellent example of utilizing early twentieth-century revival-style architecture in the design of a municipal building. The Tudor Revival style fire station blends-in with the surrounding residential architecture of the district."
- Central Park Presbyterian Church (c.1950), designed by Birmingham architect George Turner, whose architecture includes "Spanish and Mediterranean elements, including buttresses, spiral colonettes, palladian windows, a tile roof, and an octagonal lantern resting atop a three-tiered square bell tower. From the 1920s through the 1950s, George Turner, the architect of Central Park Presbyterian Church, designed scores of dwellings throughout Birmingham in the Spanish and Mediterranean Revival Styles, including a number of churches."
