= John Morrison (priest) =

John Anthony Morrison (born 11 March 1938) was the Archdeacon of Oxford from 1998 until 2005.

Morrison was educated at Haileybury and Imperial Service College and Jesus College, Cambridge. He was ordained in 1964 and began his ordained ministry as the chaplain of Lincoln College, Oxford after which he was the Vicar of Basildon, Berkshire and the Rural Dean of Bradfield. After this he was the vicar of Aylesbury and then Archdeacon of Buckingham, a position he held until 1998. He was then the Archdeacon of Oxford until his retirement in 2005.

== Notes ==
Church of England titles
Preceded by John Frank Ewan Bone	Archdeacon of Buckingham; 1990–1998	Succeeded by David Goldie
Preceded by Frank Valentine Weston	Archdeacon of Oxford; 1998–2005	Succeeded by Julian Richard Hawes Hubbard
