= Nicholas Wilson (parson) =

English clergyman (fl. 1528; died 1548)

Nicholas Wilson (fl. 1528; died 1548) was an English clergyman who initially refused to accept the Royal Supremacy during the reign of Henry VIII.

He was chaplain and confessor to Henry VIII and collated Archdeacon of Oxford in 1528. He was rector of St Thomas the Apostle, London in 1531.

According to John Foxe: upon the third day of February [1534]...for the more surety of the crown, to the which every person being of lawful age should be sworn...commissions were sent over all England, to take the oath of all men and women to the act of succession; at which few repined, except Pr. John Fisher, bishop of Rochester; Sir Thomas More, late lord chancellor; and Dr. Nicholas Wilson, parson of St. Thomas the Apostle's in London....[they] were sent to the Tower, where they remained, and were oftentimes motioned to be sworn. B...the doctor excused, that he in preaching had called her queen, and therefore now could not well unsay it again. Howbeit, at length, he was well contented to dissemble the matter, and so escaped: but the other two stood against all the realm in their opinion.

He was imprisoned from 1534 to 1537 and made dean of Wimborne Minster from 1537 to 1547.
