= Lakewood Historic District (Birmingham, Alabama) =

Historic district in Alabama, United States

- U.S. National Register of Historic Places
- Location within Alabama
- Location: Roughly bounded by Lee Ave., 82nd St., Spring St., and 80th St., Birmingham, Alabama
- Coordinates: 33°33′38″N 86°42′44″W
- Area: 40 acres (16 ha)
- Built: 1920
- Architect: George Turner
- Architectural style: Mission/spanish Revival, Tudor Revival, et.al.
- NRHP reference No.: 00000710
- Added to NRHP: June 22, 2000

The Lakewood Historic District in Birmingham, Alabama is a historic district which was listed on the National Register of Historic Places in 2000. The listing included 53 contributing buildings on 40 acres (16 ha).

Location: Roughly bounded by Lee Ave., 82nd St., Spring St., and 80th St. Year of construction: 1920

It includes work by Birmingham architect George Turner.

Architecture: Mission/Spanish Revival, Tudor Revival, et al.

Historic function: Domestic Historic subfunction: Single Dwelling Criteria: architecture/engineering
