= George Turner (architect) =

American architect

George Palmer Turner
- Born: November 8, 1896; Alabama, U.S.
- Died: November 13, 1984 (aged 88); Birmingham, Alabama, U.S.
- Education: University of Pennsylvania
- Occupation: Architect
- Works: Central Park Presbyterian Church; Seven Gables (Tallassee, Alabama)
- Style: Spanish Revival, Mediterranean Revival

George Palmer Turner (November 8, 1896 – November 13, 1984) was an American architect principally known for his residential designs in Birmingham, Alabama. From the 1920s through the 1950s, he "designed scores of dwellings throughout Birmingham in the Spanish and Mediterranean Revival Styles, including a number of churches." A number of his works are listed on the U.S. National Register of Historic Places.

== Personal life ==
A native of Alabama, he studied architecture at the University of Pennsylvania and in France before returning to his home state. At the time of the 1930 United States Census, Turner was living in Birmingham, Alabama, with his wife, Dorothy Hays Turner (1896-1982), and their children, Dorothy and George. Turner died in 1984 and is buried at Forest Hill Cemetery in Birmingham.

== Works ==
Turner's works include:

- Central Park Presbyterian Church (c.1950), whose architecture includes "Spanish and Mediterranean elements, including buttresses, spiral colonettes, palladian windows, a tile roof, and an octagonal lantern resting atop a three-tiered square bell tower. NRHP-listed as a contributing building in Belview Heights Historic District
- Five houses in the Belview Heights Historic District, designed in Spanish Revival style.
- One or more works in Howard College Estates Historic District, roughly along 77th Way, 77th Place, Vanderbilt Street, 8th Court, 8th, Rugby, and Belmont Avenues, Birmingham, Alabama, NRHP-listed
- One or more works in Lakewood Historic District, roughly bounded by Lee Avenue, 82nd Street, Spring Street, and 80th Street, Birmingham, Alabama, NRHP-listed
- One or more works in South East Lake Historic District, roughly Bounded by 78th, and 8th Streets, and Division, First, Second, and Fifth Avenues, Birmingham, Alabama, NRHP-listed
- Seven Gables, 650 Gilmer Avenue, Tallassee, Alabama
