= Lakewood School District =

Lakewood School District may refer to:

- Lakewood School District (New Jersey), Lakewood, New Jersey
- Lakewood School District (Washington), North Lakewood, Washington
