= Lakewood, Wisconsin =

- Town
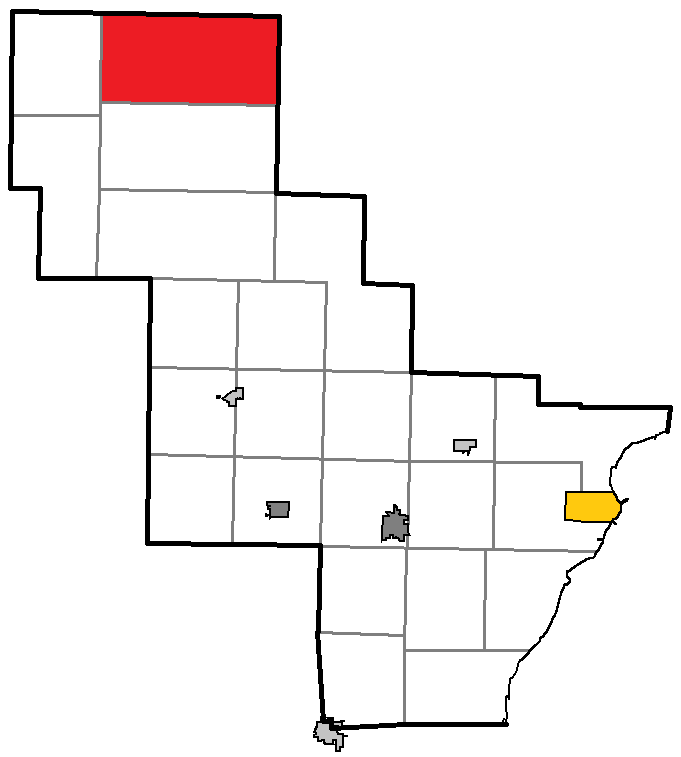
- Location of Lakewood, within Oconto County
- Coordinates: 45°19′11″N 88°26′53″W
- Country: United States
- State: Wisconsin
- County: Oconto

Area
  - Total: 72.4 sq mi (187.6 km^{2})
  - Land: 70.8 sq mi (183.4 km^{2})
  - Water: 1.6 sq mi (4.1 km^{2})
- Elevation: 1,217 ft (371 m)

Population (2020)
  - Total: 831
  - Density: 11.7/sq mi (4.53/km^{2})
- Time zone: UTC-6 (Central (CST))
  - Summer (DST): UTC-5 (CDT)
- Area codes: 715 & 534
- FIPS code: 55-42075
- GNIS feature ID: 1583520
- Website: https://www.lakewoodwisconsin.org/

Lakewood is a town in Oconto County, Wisconsin, United States. As of the 2020 census, the town population was 831. The census-designated place of Lakewood is located in the town.

== History ==
In March 1952, three children disappeared during a late spring snow storm. A two-day search for them involved 1,000 people. Mary Ann Church, age 4, was the only one of the children who survived. The other children were found frozen to death in a nearby outbuilding in the Gillet Lake area.

== Geography ==
According to the United States Census Bureau, the town has a total area of 72.4 square miles (187.5 km^{2}), of which 70.8 square miles (183.4 km^{2}) is land and 1.6 square miles (4.1 km^{2}) (2.20%) is water.

== Demographics ==
As of the census of 2000, there were 875 people, 399 households, and 282 families residing in the town. The population density was 12.4 people per square mile (4.8/km^{2}). There were 1,183 housing units at an average density of 16.7 per square mile (6.4/km^{2}). The racial makeup of the town was 96.57% White, 1.71% Native American, 0.34% from other races, and 1.37% from two or more races. Hispanic or Latino of any race were 0.34% of the population.

There were 399 households, out of which 22.6% had children under the age of 18 living with them, 63.7% were married couples living together, 3.3% had a female householder with no husband present, and 29.3% were non-families. 26.3% of all households were made up of individuals, and 13.0% had someone living alone who was 65 years of age or older. The average household size was 2.19 and the average family size was 2.60.

In the town, the population was spread out, with 18.7% under the age of 18, 3.0% from 18 to 24, 19.8% from 25 to 44, 30.5% from 45 to 64, and 28.0% who were 65 years of age or older. The median age was 51 years. For every 100 females, there were 107.3 males. For every 100 females age 18 and over, there were 102.6 males.

The median income for a household in the town was $33,869, and the median income for a family was $37,500. Males had a median income of $31,719 versus $17,404 for females. The per capita income for the town was $18,281. Below the poverty line were 7.2% of people, 6.9% of families, 1.4% of those under 18 and 14.8% of those over 64.

== Economy ==
For many years the primary industry of Lakewood was timber, but in recent decades this has changed to the service industry. Most of the local revenue is generated by the tourist trade. The Chequamegon-Nicolet National Forest, which surrounds the area, is a working forest that has been clear-cut in the past and cut-over many times. As recently as the 1950s the Lakewood area was known for its virgin timber and pristine nature, but aggressive logging and clear-cutting significantly changed the face of the area. The Holt and Balcolm logging company set aside one tract of land in which they did not cut the original growth. This area, called the "Cathedral of Pines", was preserved as a result of the efforts of Lucy Rumsey Holt who influenced her husband, logger W. A. Holt, to leave it as virgin timber. Mrs. Holt used this area to teach Bible studies to her children and did not want the area disturbed. This 200- to 400-year-old white pine and balsam old growth stand is also home to a great blue heron rookery.

McCaslin Brook (also spelled McCauslin) was used as a means of transporting large quantities of logs to saw-mills or for transportation to major cities where the timber was sold. The oldest logging camp in the United States can be found on what is now the McCaslin Brook Golf Course.

Today the Lakewood area serves as a get-away for visitors from the Green Bay, Appleton, and many other areas. Water skiing, tubing, canoeing, and fishing are area activities.

== YMCA Camp ==
The YMCA camp Nan A Bo Sho, an overnight camp in Lakewood owned by the YMCA Fox Cities of Appleton, has been in operation since 1964. Here campers learn sailing, arts and crafts, an engage in other outdoor activities. It is a popular summer getaway located on Waubee lake.
