= Lakewood, Indiana =

- Census-designated place
- Location within Indiana Location within the United States
- Coordinates: 39°23′43″N 87°18′00″W
- Country: United States
- State: Indiana
- County: Vigo
- Township: Riley

Area
  - Total: 0.319 sq mi (0.83 km^{2})
  - Land: 0.282 sq mi (0.73 km^{2})
  - Water: 0.037 sq mi (0.096 km^{2})
- Elevation: 554 ft (169 m)
- Time zone: UTC-5 (Eastern (EST))
  - Summer (DST): UTC-4 (EDT)
- ZIP code: 47802 (Terre Haute)
- Area codes: 812, 930
- GNIS feature ID: 2830566
- FIPS code: 18-41706

Lakewood is an unincorporated community and census-designated place (CDP) in Vigo County, Indiana, United States.

== Geography ==
Lakewood is in southeastern Vigo County, bordered to the south by the town of Riley and surrounding a small reservoir. The city of Terre Haute is 9 miles (14 km) to the northwest.

According to the U.S. Census Bureau, the Lakewood CDP has a total area of 0.32 square miles (0.83 km^{2}), of which 0.28 square miles (0.73 km^{2}) are land and 0.04 square miles (0.10 km^{2}), or 11.60%, are water. The lake drains to a north-flowing tributary of Honey Creek, which flows west to the Wabash River south of Terre Haute.

== Demographics ==
The United States Census Bureau delineated Lakewood as a census designated place in the 2022 American Community Survey.
