= Lakewood Village =

Lakewood Village is the name of some places in the United States:

- Lakewood Village, Texas
- Lakewood Village, Long Beach, California
