= Lakewood Park (disambiguation) =

Lakewood Park may refer to:

- Lakewood Park (North Little Rock, Arkansas), listed on the National Register of Historic Places in Arkansas
- Lakewood Park, California, a place in Los Angeles County
- Lakewood Park, Florida, census-designated place in St. Lucie County
- Lakewood Park, Tennessee, census-designated place in Coffee County
