= David Goldie (priest) =

The Venerable David Goldie BA

Archdeacon of Buckingham
- In office 1998–2002

Personal details
- Born: 20 December 1946
- Died: 7 April 2002 (aged 55)
- Spouse: (Emily) Rosemary née Robson

David Goldie (20 December 1946 – 7 April 2002) was a priest in the Church of England.

Goldie was educated at Glasgow Academy and Fitzwilliam College, Cambridge and ordained in 1971. After curacies in Swindon and Troon he was mission priest at Irving new town. He later held incumbencies at Ardrossan and Milton Keynes. He became the Archdeacon of Buckingham in 1998 and held the post for four years.

Goldie's daughter, Katrina Scott, has been the Archdeacon of Cheltenham since March 2025.

Religious titles
Preceded by John Anthony Morrison	Archdeacon of Buckingham; 1998–2002	Succeeded by Sheila Watson
