= George Rye =

English Anglican priest

George Rye was an English Anglican priest in the 18th century.

Rye was born in Culworth, the son of George and Elizabeth Rye (nee Tipping). The elder George Rye was educated at Trinity College, Oxford and Lincoln's Inn and was appointed a “Gentleman of His Majesty’s Most Honourable Privy Chamber in ordinary” in 1672.

George Rye was educated at Wadham College, Oxford, and then was a Fellow of Oriel College, earning his B.A. in 1695, his M.A. in 1698, a B.D. in 1713-14 and his D.D. in 1715. Rye published a copy of his sermon, "The Supremacy of the Crown, and the Power of the Church, Asserted and Adjusted. A sermon preach'd before the University of Oxford, at St Mary's, on Sunday Jan. 17. 1713/14" and held livings at Adwell, Islip and Ickford. He was appointed Archdeacon of Oxford in 1724; and Regius Professor of Divinity at the University of Oxford as well as being appointed as a canon of Christ Church, Oxford in 1737, holding all three positions until his death on 4 July 1741. He was buried at Culworth.
