= George Turner (priest) =

English cleric

George Turner, D.D. (Compton, Surrey, 3 April 1734 – Oxford, 30 October 1797) was an English cleric, Archdeacon of Oxford from 30 June 1783 until his death.

Turner was educated at Merton College, Oxford, where he matriculated in 1753, and graduated B.A. in 1756. He was Vicar of Culham and a Prebendary of Winchester.
