= Lakewood, Iowa =

- Ghost town
- Location within Iowa Location within the United States
- Country: United States
- State: Iowa
- County: Lyon
- Elevation: 1,312 ft (400 m)
- Time zone: UTC-6 (Central (CST))
  - Summer (DST): UTC-5 (CDT)
- GNIS feature ID: 1906671

Lakewood is a ghost town in Lyon County, in the U.S. state of Iowa.

== History ==
A post office was established at Lakewood in 1900, and remained in operation until it was discontinued in 1918. The town was named from a nearby lake in the woods.

Lakewood's population was 25 in 1925. The population was 9 in 1940.

== See also ==
- List of ghost towns in the United States
