= George Turner (footballer, born 1910) =

English footballer

Personal information
- Date of birth: 1910
- Place of birth: Mansfield, England
- Height: 5 ft 9 1/210 in (1.75 m)
- Position: Outside left

Senior career*
Years	Team	Apps	(Gls)
- Mansfield Athletic
- Sneinton
- Notts County
- Luton Town
1932–1934	Everton	2	(0)
1934–1935	Bradford City	16	(2)
- Luton Town
- Northampton Town
- Newark Town
Total		18+	(2+)
- * Club domestic league appearances and goals

George W. Turner (born 1910) was an English professional footballer who played as an outside left.

== Career ==
Born in Mansfield, Turner spent his early career with Mansfield Athletic, Sneinton, Notts County, Luton Town and Everton. He made two league appearances for Everton in 1932 after joining them from Luton Town. He joined Bradford City from Everton in June 1934, making 16 league appearances for the club, before returning to Luton Town in June 1935. He later played for Northampton Town and Newark Town.

== Sources ==
- Frost, Terry (1988). Bradford City A Complete Record 1903-1988. Breedon Books Sport. ISBN 0-907969-38-0.
