= Lakewood Township =

Lakewood Township may refer to:

- Lakewood Township, Shelby County, Illinois
- Lakewood Township, New Jersey
- Lakewood Township, Lake of the Woods County, Minnesota
- Lakewood Township, St. Louis County, Minnesota
