= Lakewood (CDP), Wisconsin =

Census-designated place in Wisconsin, United States

Lakewood, Wisconsin
- Census-designated place
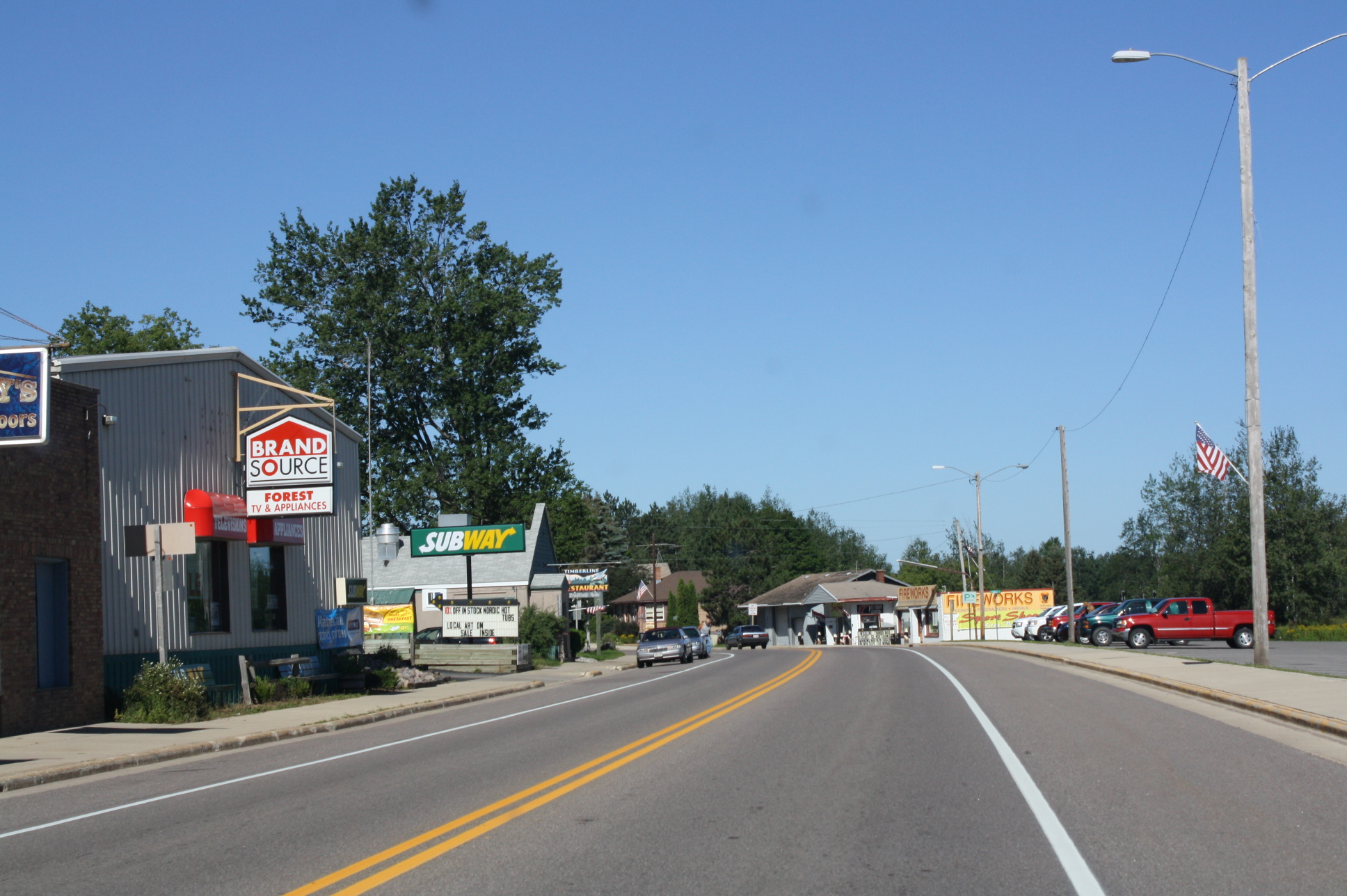
- Downtown Lakewood on WIS 32

- Location within Wisconsin
- Coordinates: 45°18′03″N 88°31′24″W
- Country: United States
- State: Wisconsin
- County: Oconto

Area
  - Total: 2.781 sq mi (7.20 km^{2})
  - Land: 2.781 sq mi (7.20 km^{2})
  - Water: 0 sq mi (0 km^{2})
- Elevation: 1,280 ft (390 m)

Population (2020)
  - Total: 241
  - Density: 86.7/sq mi (33.5/km^{2})
- Time zone: UTC-6 (Central (CST))
  - Summer (DST): UTC-5 (CDT)
- ZIP code: 54138
- Area codes: 715 & 534
- GNIS feature ID: 1579620

Lakewood is an unincorporated census-designated place located in the town of Lakewood, Oconto County, Wisconsin, United States. Lakewood is located on Wisconsin Highway 32, 22 miles (35 km) north-northwest of Suring. Lakewood has a post office with ZIP code 54138. As of the 2020 census, its population was 241, down from 323 at the 2010 census.

== History ==
Lakewood was laid out in 1897 by the Western Town Lot Company. It was named from a lake in the woods near the town site. A post office has been in operation in Lakewood since 1897. The first schoolhouse was built on the Brook Farm in 1906. In 1921, a fire nearly destroyed the entire town.

== Images ==
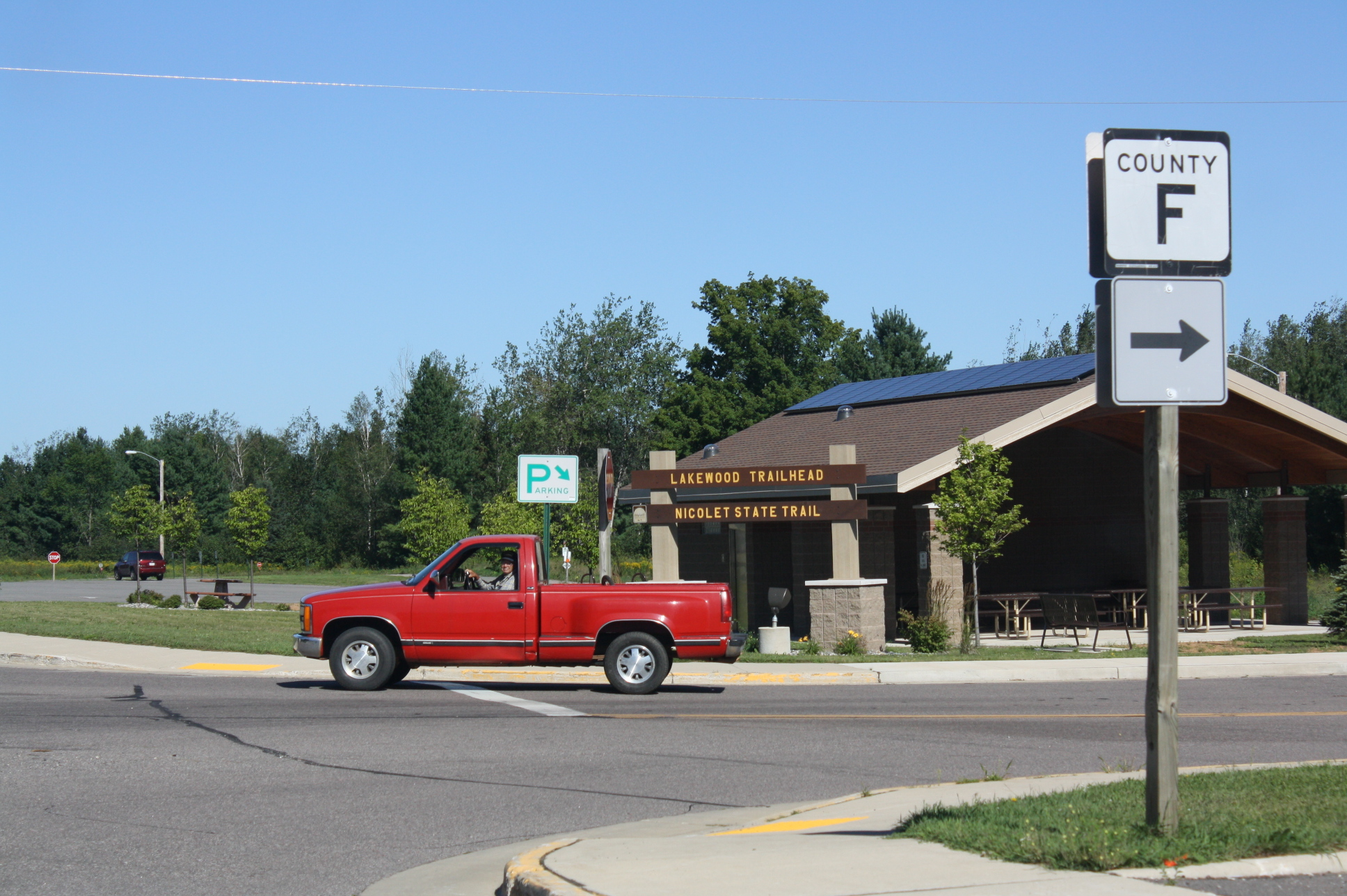
Nicolet State Trailhead

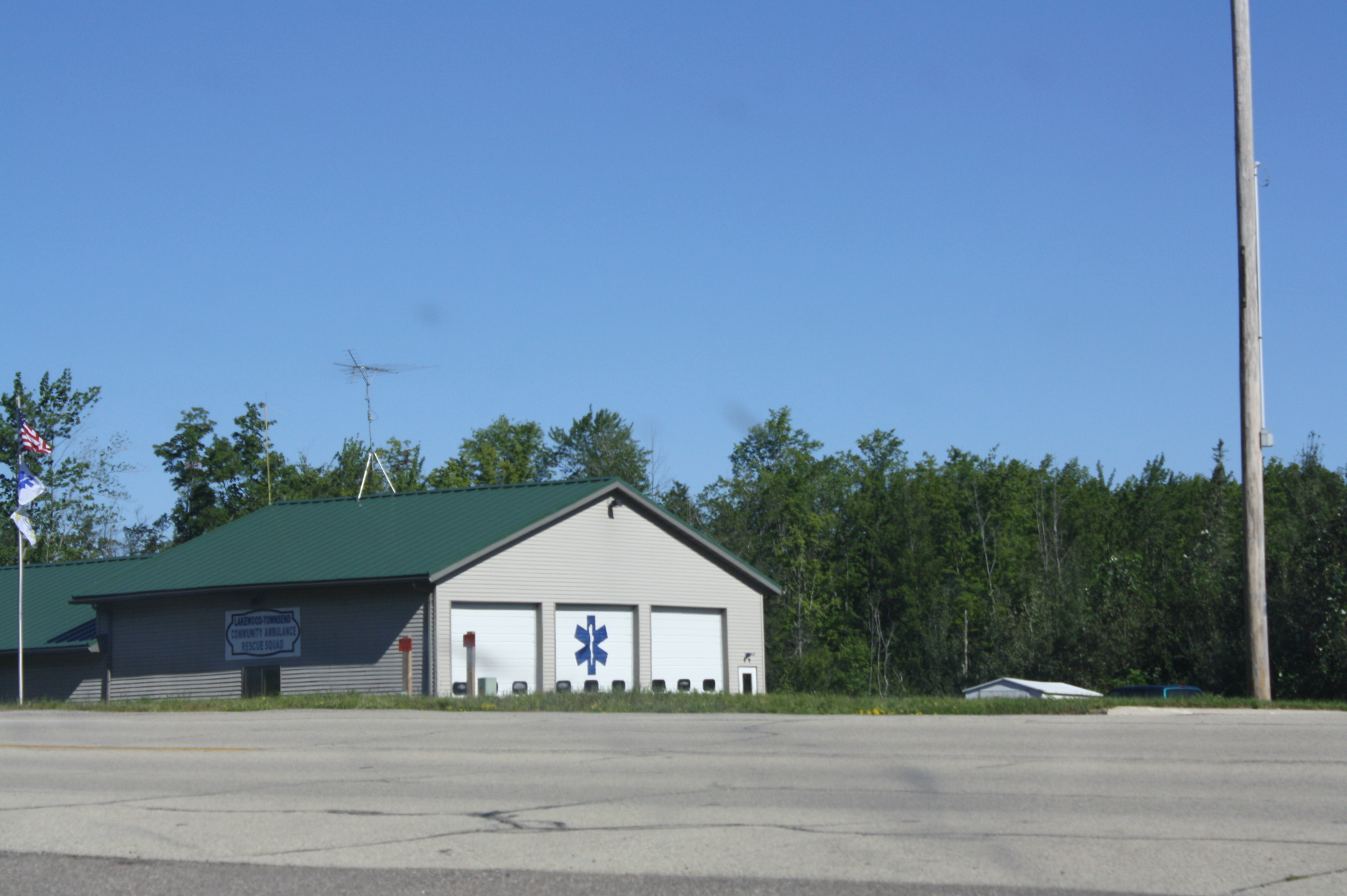
Ambulance service
