= George Turner (civil servant) =

Sir George Wilfred Turner, KCB, KBE (22 January 1896 – 10 May 1974) was a British civil servant.

Born on 22 January 1896, Turner attended Rotherham Grammar School before entering HM Civil Service as a boy clerk in the War Office in 1911; this was the lowest grade in the clerical class. He moved up to the second division in 1914; he served for a short time in the Home Office and Post Office, but was back in the War Office from the outbreak of the First World War until 1916, when he entered the army; he served in the Grenadier Guards and was twice wounded in action.

After demobilisation in 1919, Turner returned to his old department. He was promoted to assistant principal in 1921 and principal in 1934. He was made civil assistant to the Director-General of Munitions Supply in 1936, which was spun out to form the Ministry of Supply in 1939 (on the outbreak of the Second World War); Turner was appointed principal assistant secretary in 1941 and second secretary the next year. He was then appointed Permanent Secretary of the War Office in 1949, serving until 1956. This period coincided with the Korean War, the Malayan Emergency and the withdrawal of troops from the Suez Canal Zone. He received several honours in recognition of his service; in the 1944 New Year Honours, he was appointed a Knight Commander of the Order of the British Empire (KBE) and, in the 1950 New Year Honours. a Knight Commander of the Order of the Bath (KCB).

In retirement, Turner moved to the Cornwall (until that point he had lived in the same London house that he had occupied since the beginning of his career); he held various directorships in the private sector, including for ITT Creed and the Goodyear Tyres. He died on 10 May 1974.
