= Lakewood Balmoral Historic District =

Historic district in Illinois, United States

- U.S. National Register of Historic Places
- U.S. Historic district
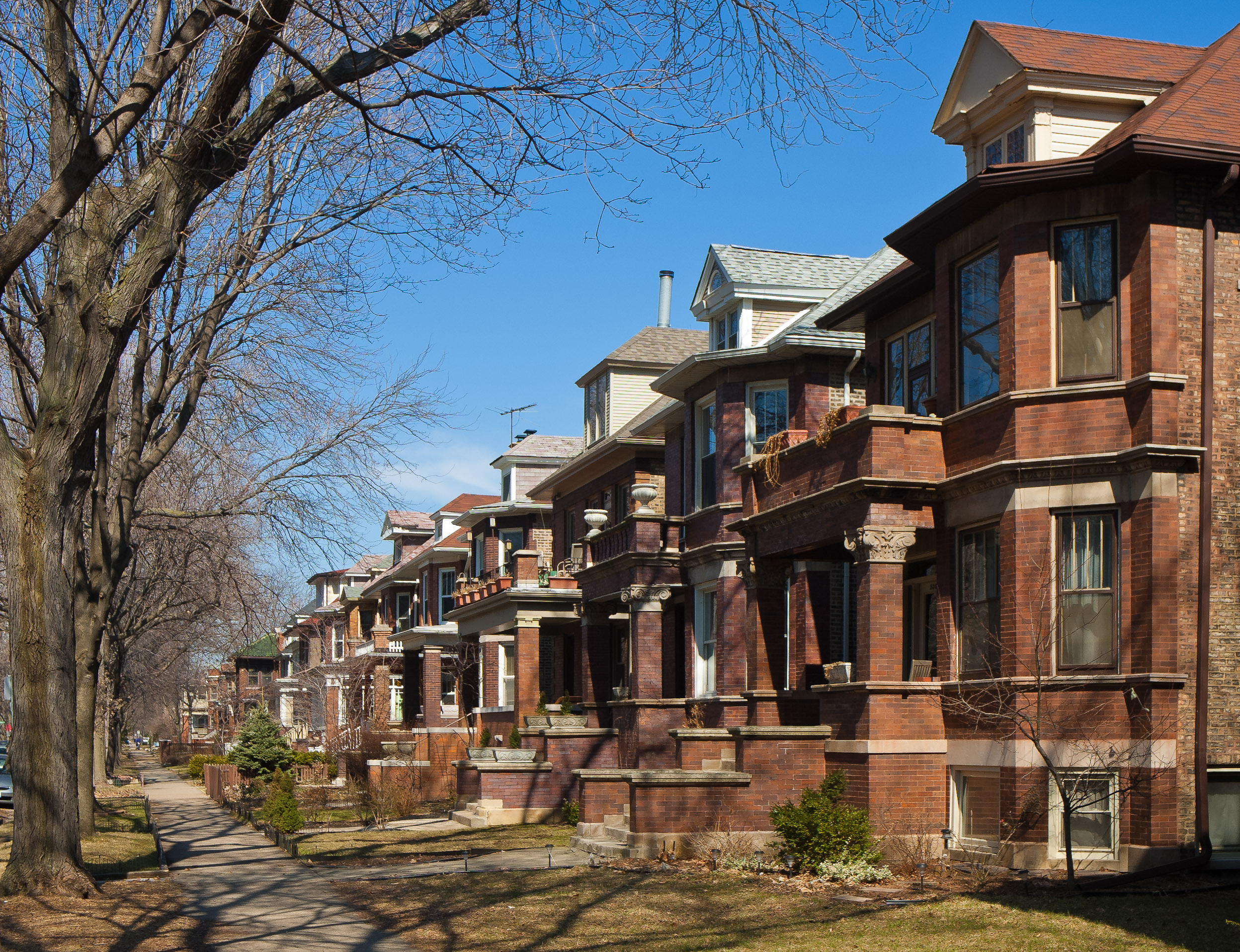
- Houses on Wayne Avenue in the Lakewood Balmoral Historic District

- Location within Illinois
- Location: Bounded by Magnolia, Wayne, Foster, and Bryn Mawr Aves., Chicago, Illinois
- Coordinates: 41°58′48″N 87°39′45″W
- Area: 63 acres (25 ha)
- Built: 1890s-1900s
- Architectural style: Queen Anne, Shingle Style
- NRHP reference No.: 99000162
- Added to NRHP: February 12, 1999

The Lakewood Balmoral Historic District is a historic district in the Edgewater community area of Chicago, Illinois. It was listed on the National Register of Historic Places on February 12, 1999. The district covers an area of about 63 acres (0.25 km^{2}); its boundaries are Magnolia Avenue to the east, Wayne Avenue to the west, Foster Avenue to the south, and Bryn Mawr Avenue to the north.

The area is easily accessible from the Berwyn station on the Chicago "L" Red Line.

== History ==
John Lewis Cochran, the first major developer in the Edgewater area, purchased the land which makes up the Lakewood Balmoral district in 1890. Known as Cochran's Third Addition to Edgewater, the region was marketed to middle-class families, as opposed to the Edgewater lakefront, which was mostly mansions at the time. Many of the streets in the district were named by Cochran. Berwyn Avenue, Bryn Mawr Avenue and Wayne Avenue were named after stations on the Main Line running north of his native Philadelphia. Catalpa Avenue was named after a street in Philadelphia, Lakewood Avenue after the town of Lakewood, New Jersey, and Balmoral—a nod to Cochran's Scottish ancestry—after Balmoral Castle in Scotland.

The Lakewood Balmoral district was listed on the National Register of Historic Places in 1999. In 1999, it included 490 buildings deemed to contribute to the historic character of the area.
