= Osbert fitzHervey =

12th and 13th-century English royal justice

- Died: 1206
- Occupation: Royal justice
- Spouse: Margaret
- Parent(s): Hervey Walter; Maud de Valoignes

Osbert fitzHervey (died 1206) was an Anglo-Norman royal judge. Brother of Hubert Walter and Theobald Walter, Osbert served three kings of England and may have contributed to the legal treatise attributed to his uncle, Ranulf de Glanvill. Ralph of Coggeshall, a medieval writer, praised Osbert's knowledge of law, but condemned his acceptance of gifts from plaintiffs and defendants in legal cases. Osbert was one of a group of men who are considered the first signs of a professional judiciary in England.

== Background and early life ==
Osbert was from East Anglia, where he held lands. He was a younger brother of Hubert Walter, later Archbishop of Canterbury, and thus the son of Hervey Walter and his wife Maud de Valoignes, one of the daughters (and co-heiresses) of Theobald de Valoignes, lord of Parham in Suffolk. Osbert was one of six brothers. The older brothers, Theobald Walter and Hubert, were helped in their careers by their uncle, Ranulf de Glanvill. (Note: The Complete Peerage lists Theobald as the eldest brother, but other historians are less certain.) Glanvill was the chief justiciar for Henry II; and was married to Maud de Valoignes' sister, Bertha. The other three brothers – Roger, Hamo (or Hamon) and Bartholomew – only appear as witnesses to charters. (Note: Osbert had a relative with the same name who was the brother of his uncle Glanvill, and with whom this Osbert should not be confused.)

Osbert's lands were chiefly in Norfolk and Suffolk, but he also had some lands in Essex and some from the Count of Perche. Other lands were held from two monastic houses in East Anglia: St Benet Holme and Bury St Edmunds.

== Career ==
Osbert served as a royal judge under three English kings: Henry II, Richard I, and John. He was often sent as an itinerant justice to East Anglia; the historian Barbara Dodwell said of him that "of all the justices his knowledge of East Anglian disputes was probably the greatest". It appears that Osbert's royal service was confined to judicial matters, as no other evidence of any other offices has surfaced.

The treatise Tractatus of Glanvill, which is traditionally attributed to Osbert's uncle Ranulf de Glanvill, (Note: That Glanvill was the author of the treatise is no longer considered likely by most historians.) and to which Osbert himself may have contributed, names only seven judges, including Osbert. He was one of a group of royal justices that included Simon of Pattishall, Ralph Foliot, Richard Barre, William de Warenne, and Richard Herriard, used by Hubert Walter, the Justiciar of England during Richard's reign, and chosen for their ability rather than any familial ties. This group replaced the previous system of using mostly local men, and represent the first signs of a professional judiciary. In 1194 Osbert was one of the collectors of the carucage in eastern England, along with Barre and de Warrene.

== Later life and death ==
In 1198, Osbert married Margaret of Rye, (Note: She is sometimes known as Margaret de Ria or Margaret of Brancaster, which may mean that she was a widow.) with whom he had at least one son. Osbert paid the king 20 pounds for the right to marry Margaret. Osbert died in 1206, without having made a will. At his death, his yearly income was more than 240 pounds. Ralph of Coggeshall mentions Osbert, without using his name, as a royal judge who would go to Hell in his "Vision of Thurkill". This work detailed the punishments that awaited sinners, and Osbert was accused of accepting gifts from both sides of lawsuits. Coggeshall did state that Osbert was "most expert in worldly law" and was famous for "his overflowing eloquence and experience in the law". According to Coggeshall, Osbert's punishment in Hell would consist of having to swallow hot coins and then being forced to vomit the coins back up. After his death, William of Huntingfield offered King John a fine for the right to the custody of Osbert's heir and lands, the fine amounting to 200 marks and two palfreys.
