= Hugh Nonant =

12th-century Bishop of Coventry

- Bishop of Coventry
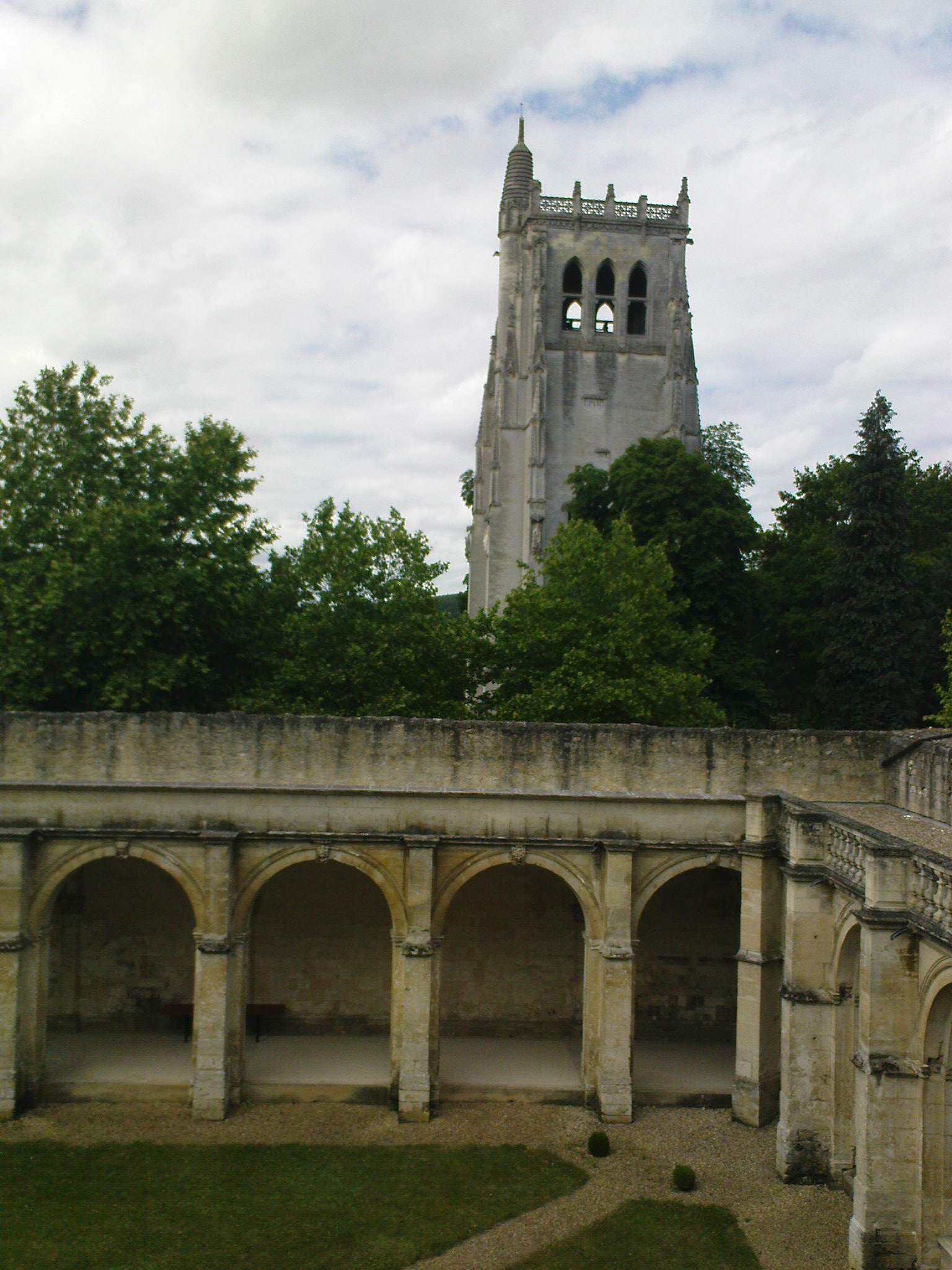
- Modern-day view of the cloisters at Bec Abbey, where Hugh Nonant died
- Elected: 1185
- Term ended: 1198
- Predecessor: Gerard la Pucelle
- Successor: Geofrey de Muschamp
- Other post: Archdeacon in Lisieux

Orders
- Consecration: 31 January 1188

Personal details
- Died: 27 March 1198 Bec Abbey, Normandy

Hugh Nonant (sometimes Hugh de Nonant; died 27 March 1198) was a medieval Bishop of Coventry in England. A great-nephew and nephew of two Bishops of Lisieux, he held the office of archdeacon in that diocese before serving successively Thomas Becket, the Archbishop of Canterbury, and King Henry II of England. Diplomatic successes earned him the nomination to Coventry, but diplomatic missions after his elevation led to a long delay before he was consecrated. After King Henry's death, Nonant served Henry's son, King Richard I, who rewarded him with the office of sheriff in three counties. Nonant replaced his monastic cathedral chapter with secular clergy, and attempted to persuade his fellow bishops to do the same, but was unsuccessful. When King Richard was captured and held for ransom, Nonant supported Prince John's efforts to seize power in England, but had to purchase Richard's favour when the king returned.

== Early life ==
Nonant was a great-nephew of John, Bishop of Lisieux, who had been the chief deputy in Normandy of King Henry I of England, and he was also a nephew of Arnulf of Lisieux, another bishop of Lisieux. Nonant had a brother, Sylvester, who was treasurer of Lisieux. Hugh Nonant was a canon in his uncle Arnulf's cathedral chapter before serving as an archdeacon of the diocese of Lisieux from 1167 until 1184. Nonant served in the household of Thomas Becket while Becket was Archbishop of Canterbury, and went into exile with Becket, although he left Becket's service while the archbishop was in exile. While in Becket's service, Nonant may have authored a letter dated to 1165 that is attributed to Becket. Nonant had been reconciled to King Henry II of England by 1170. Along with Richard Barre, Nonant was named in January 1184 as a papal judge-delegate in a case between two Norman monasteries. In 1184, Nonant was sent by the king to the papal curia to petition Pope Lucius III on behalf of Henry the Lion, Duke of Saxony and Henry II's son-in-law. Nonant's success on this mission was probably the reason he was elevated to the episcopate in 1185.

== Bishop of Coventry ==
Nonant was elected bishop in 1185, probably in January, and consecrated on 31 January 1188. The long delay between his election and his consecration was due to Nonant's continued diplomatic efforts on behalf of Henry II. In 1186, he was sent to Rome to secure papal permission for the crowning of Prince John as King of Ireland. The bishop-elect was briefly in England from December 1186 until February 1187, but then went with King Henry to the continent and did not return to England until January 1188. However, when Henry returned to France in July 1188, Hugh accompanied the king and did not return until shortly before the coronation of King Richard I of England. Nonant also purchased the offices of Sheriff of Warwickshire, Leicestershire, and Staffordshire. Holding these offices was against canon law, and the bishop's tenure in these offices may have been the cause of his quarrel with Baldwin of Forde.

It was after the coronation of Richard that Nonant had a dispute with the monks of his cathedral chapter, which led to Nonant replacing the monks with secular clergy. He was said to have commented that "I call my clerks gods and the monks demons." Nonant was very shrewd and eloquent, but he was also violent in his attempts to reform or expel his monastic clergy from Coventry. In October 1189, he attempted to persuade his fellow bishops who had monastic cathedral chapters to expel the monks and replace them with secular clergy. He also attempted to get all the bishops to prosecute a joint case at Rome to expel the monastic cathedral chapters, but gave up that idea after the Archbishop of Canterbury, Baldwin of Exeter, declined to go along. Nonant did, however, receive papal sanction for the replacement of monks at Coventry. By 1197, however, Pope Celestine III issued instructions to Hubert Walter, the new Archbishop of Canterbury, Hugh of Lincoln, the Bishop of Lincoln and Samson of Tottington, the Abbot of Bury St Edmunds, to restore the monks to the cathedral.

After King Richard went to the Holy Land on the Third Crusade, Nonant supported the efforts of Prince John, King Richard's brother, to seize power in England. Nonant joined with John in trying to wrest control of the castles of Tickhill and Nottingham from William Longchamp, the Bishop of Ely, who had been named justiciar and chancellor during Richard's absence. It was probably Nonant who was responsible for the meeting at Loddon Bridge on 5 October 1191 that ended in the deposition of Longchamp from office. Nonant supported John's side throughout the time that Richard was on Crusade and in captivity, and was tried with John after Richard's return to England in 1194. Nonant was only restored to royal favour in 1195 after the payment of a fine of 5000 marks. The bishop lost his three sheriffdoms, and retired to Normandy.

== Death and legacy ==
Nonant died on 27 March 1198. Before his death he was clothed in the habit of a Benedictine monk by the monks of Bec Abbey and he died at Bec. On his deathbed, he confessed a long record of sins, which deterred any priest from absolving him. The historian A. L. Poole described Hugh as a "dexterous and unprincipled politician who had inherited the diplomatic gifts of his uncle." Another historian, John Gillingham, stated that Nonant was King "John's chief propagandist and, in his spare time, bishop of Coventry". Hugh's brother was Robert Brito, who was captured by King Richard in 1194 and starved to death because Robert had earlier refused to be a hostage for the payment of Richard's ransom.

The constitutions of the cathedral chapter at Lichfield are often stated to have been Nonant's work, but this has been disproven. The chronicler Roger of Howden inserted a letter supposedly by Nonant in his Chronica. This letter was also preserved in other manuscripts, including a section of a manuscript now in the Bodleian Library as manuscript (MS) Additional A.44. This letter has now been published as part of the English Episcopal Acta series in the volume on the diocese of Lichfield and Coventry.

== Citations ==
Catholic Church titles
Preceded by Gerard la Pucelle	Bishop of Coventry; 1185–1198	Succeeded by Geofrey de Muschamp
