= Hugh Bardulf =

12th-century Anglo-Norman nobleman and sheriff

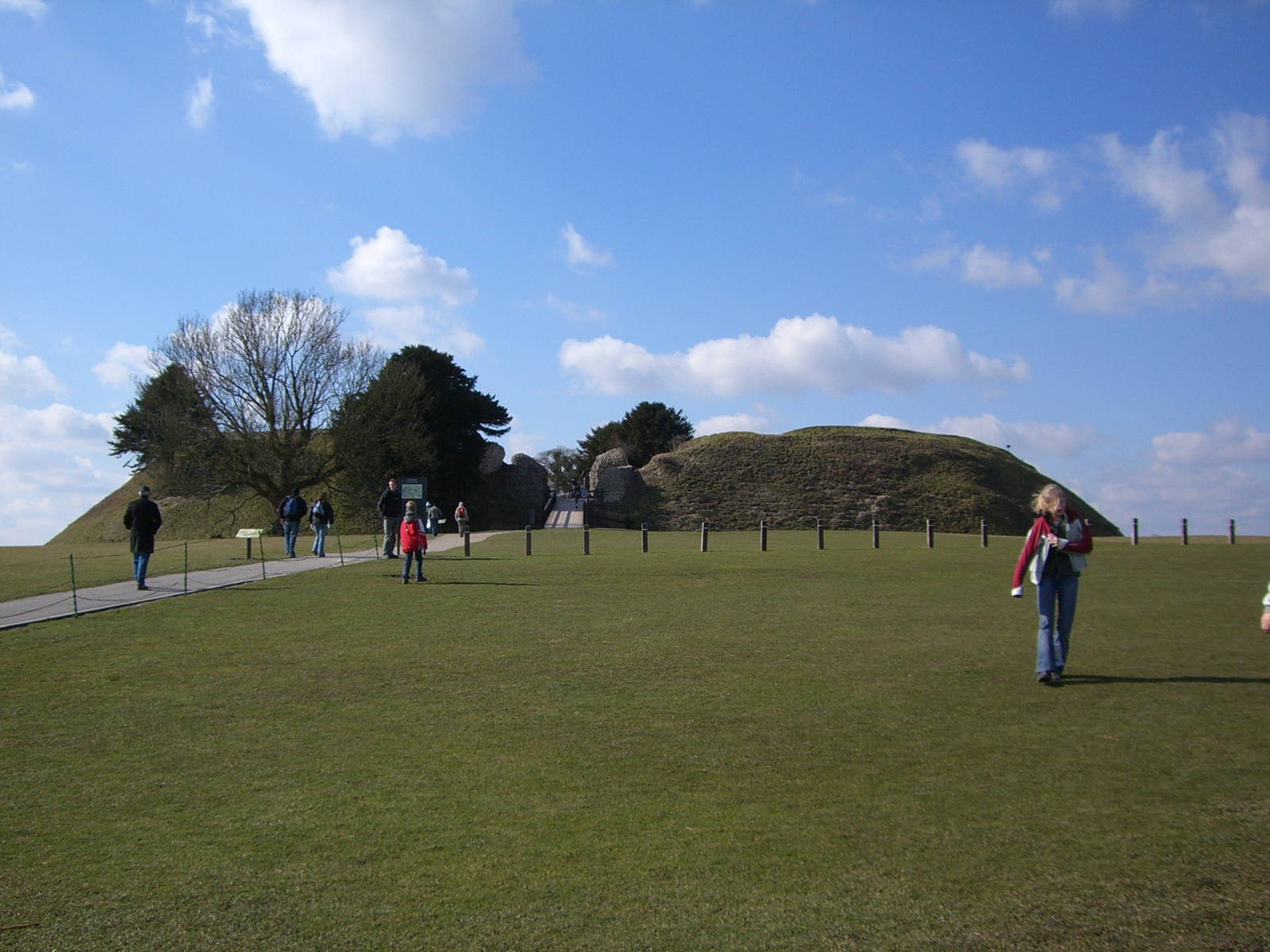
- Modern-day view of Old Sarum, where Bardulf had custody of the castle, which no longer exists.

Royal justice
- In office c. 1185 – c. 1203

Baron of the Exchequer
- In office c. 1185 – c. 1203

Personal details
- Died: before 1203
- Spouse: Mabel
- Occupation: Judge and administrator

Hugh Bardulf or Hugh Bardolf (died c. 1203) was a medieval English administrator and royal justice. Known for his legal expertise, he also served as a financial administrator. He served three kings of England before his death.

Bardulf began his royal service under King Henry II of England, where he was a steward to the royal household. He also served as a royal justice and a sheriff during Henry's reign and continued as sheriff under Henry's son and successor, Richard I. Because Bardulf was a vassal of Richard's younger brother John, who rebelled against his older brother, Bardulf was denounced briefly as a traitor to Richard. He was quickly restored to royal service, however, and continued in service throughout the rest of Richard's reign and into the reign of John. Bardulf died sometime before 1203, and his heir was his brother, Robert Bardulf.

== Early life ==
Historians are divided on Hugh Bardulf's ancestry. Katharine Keats-Rohan says that he was the son of Hamelin Bardulf, a tenant of Hugh Bigod, who held land in Suffolk. Ralph V. Turner, revising John Horace Round's entry in the Dictionary of National Biography for the Oxford Dictionary of National Biography says that Hugh was the son of a Hugh Bardulf who died around 1176. According to Turner and Round, the younger Hugh's mother was Isabel, who may have been a member of the Twist family from Lincolnshire. The younger Hugh acquired land at Waddington, Lincolnshire as a tenant of Ranulf de Gernon, 4th Earl of Chester, sometime in the middle 1140s.

== Royal service ==
In 1181, Bardulf was at the court of King Henry II of England, where he was steward, or dapifer, an office he held throughout Henry's reign and which he may have held throughout the next reign also. He held that office until Henry's death in 1189. From about 1185 until 1203, Bardulf was a royal justice almost annually, usually as a justice of eyre rather than sitting at Westminster. He performed the duties of sheriff for the following counties: Cornwall from 1184 to 1187, Wiltshire from 1187 to 1189, Somerset during 1188 and 1189 along with Dorset during the same period, the counties of Staffordshire, Warwickshire and Leicestershire during 1190 and 1191, Yorkshire from 1191 to 1194, Westmorland from 1191 to 1199, Northumberland from 1194 to 1198, Cumberland during 1198 and 1199, Cornwall again from 1199 to 1200 along with Devonshire, and Nottinghamshire and Derbyshire from 1200 to 1203.

In 1194, Bardulf was mentioned on the escheat roll as responsible for the farm of lands held by Osbert de Bayeux, an archdeacon of York.

== Under Richard and John ==
In 1189, Hugh was one of only five sitting sheriffs who retained their office when Richard took the throne; the others included Geoffrey fitzPeter, William Briwerre, and Ranulf de Glanvill. However, in 1189, Bardulf lost custody of Salisbury Castle, which he had held under Henry. Henry had given Bardulf the manor and barony of Brampton in Devonshire, but when Richard took the throne, the king took back Brampton and gave Bardulf the manor of Hoo in Kent instead.

Although Bardulf set out with the new King, Richard I, on the Third Crusade, he turned back after a period in Messina, and returned to England. There, he was part of the administration during the Justiciarship of Hugh de Puiset, the Bishop of Durham, and William Longchamp, the Bishop of Ely. Longchamp gave him custody of Kenilworth Castle. Bardulf then was involved in the attempts of Walter de Coutances to remove Longchamp from office, which led to Longchamp excommunicating Bardulf. In 1193, Bardulf helped with the defences of Doncaster against the forces of Prince John, Richard's brother, who was rebelling against Richard while the king was on crusade. However, Bardulf refused to besiege Tickhill near Doncaster, because he was a vassal of John's, which led to him being denounced as a traitor. Although he was required to surrender his shrievalty of Yorkshire, he was immediately appointed to other sheriff offices. On 31 March 1194, Hugh was named an escheator for estates confiscated by Richard in the northern part of England in relation to John's rebellion. While Richard was in captivity in Germany in 1193, Bardulf, along with William Marshall, Geoffrey fitzPeter and William Briwerre, was a recipient of letters from the captive king, urging the election of Hubert Walter as Archbishop of Canterbury.

Bardulf was also a financial administrator. He served as a Baron of the Exchequer during the reigns of Henry, Richard and John. In 1196, he was the collector of taxation in seven shires, along with Philip of Poitou, the bishop-elect of Durham. Around 1197, Hugh was named as responsible for the "bail and custody" of the Jewish population in England, along with William of Sainte-Mère-Eglise, the Bishop of London, who was his fellow escheator in the north. The office in charge of the bail and custody of the Jews was probably a forerunner of the office of Keeper of the Jews.

Bardulf continued to serve Richard until the king's death and then served John, who became king, until sometime before Michaelmas 1203, when records show that Bardulf was known to be deceased.

== Legacy and personal life ==
Bardulf was known for his legal expertise, which led to him being one of the few justices mentioned by name in Glanvill, an early medieval English legal text, although whether by the original author or by a glossator, is unclear. His long career as a justice helped create a sense of continuity in judicial matters through the reigns of the Angevin kings. He remained on such good terms with Hubert Walter, that when Walter was appointed chancellor at the beginning of John's reign, Bardulf made a comment to the new chancellor that included a pointed barb about the last Archbishop of Canterbury to also be chancellor, Thomas Becket. Bardulf was on good enough terms that he was able to tease Walter, "We have never heard nor seen an archbishop become a chancellor, but we have seen a chancellor become an archbishop."

The justice married Mabel de Limesy, daughter of Gerard de Limesy, and coheir with her sisters of their brother John de Limesy, with the marriage taking place in 1200. When he died, his heir was Robert Bardulf, his brother. Hugh Bardulf gave land capable of pasturing 500 sheep to Barlings Abbey. Robert, his heir, offered a £1,000 fine to receive the inheritance, and William de Briouze made an identical offer for the right to marry his son to Mabel, Hugh's widow.

After Bardulf's death, a legal case was brought against Bardulf's chaplain and constable, alleging that Bardulf had allowed his two servants to hear a case that should have been heard by the justice. The litigants charged that the two servants had wrongly decided the case, and after hearing the allegations, the royal justices at Westminster agreed and restored the disputed property to the litigants.
