= Richard Herriard =

12th and 13th-century English royal judge

Richard Herriard (sometimes Richard of Herriard) (died 1208) was an English royal justice.

Herriard's first appearance in the historical record is in 1184 when he is mentioned in connection with the pardoning of payment of scutage on some land he held in Wiltshire. At that time, he was a knight serving Robert, the Earl of Leicester. Herriard also held land in Herriard and Southrope in Hampshire, and took his name from the first village. The lands in Hampshire were held from William, the Earl of Salisbury.

Herriard had married before 1183, and his wife was named Ela, and she was the co-heir, along with her sister, of lands at Somerford in Wiltshire. She and her sister were the daughters of Roger fitzGeoffrey.

Herriard's first service as an administrator was for Geoffrey fitzPeter, where he served as the undersheriff for Essex and Herefordshire in 1192.

From 1194, during the reign of King Richard I, Herriard appears regularly as a royal justice, along with Richard Barre, William of Sainte-Mère-Eglise, Ralph Foliot, and William de Warenne. These men constituted a set of professional judges, brought into being by Hubert Walter, the Justiciar. He remained a justice for 10 years, retiring from the bench in 1204.

Unconnected with his judicial duties, in 1195 Herriard was in charge of the delivery of a shipment of horses to King Richard, which entailed the justice crossing the English Channel to Normandy to deliver them. In 1198 Herriard was sent to deliver a subsidy to Richard's nephew, Otto, who was attempting to be proclaimed German Emperor. Another duty, unconnected with justice, appears in the Memoranda Roll for the first year of King John's reign, where it appears that Herriard was responsible for paying prostitutes for the new king.

Herriard died about 6 April 1208. He had a son, also named Richard, with whom he is occasionally confused in the records. The elder Richard also had a daughter, who married Richard de Sifrewast. After Herriard's death, Geoffrey fitzPeter took custody of both the heir to Herriard's lands and the lands themselves.
