= William de Warenne (justice) =

11th and 12th-century Anglo-Norman nobleman and royal judge

- Died: 1209
- Burial place: St Mary Overy, Southwark
- Occupations: Feudal baron of Wormegay; Royal justice
- Spouse: Melisent
- Children: Beatrice
- Parent(s): Reginald de Warenne; Alice de Wormegay

William de Warenne (died 1209), the feudal baron of Wormegay, served as a royal justice under King Richard I and his brother King John. Warenne also served in financial matters, being one of those responsible for collecting taxes, and later overseeing debts from Christians to Jews. His career was closely tied to that of Hubert Walter, who employed Warenne as a judge in some ecclesiastical matters. He also founded a priory, and gave other gifts to religious houses. The historian Ralph V. Turner said of Warenne that "although he was a longtime official under King John, he did not quite fit into the inner corps of royal counselors".

== Early life ==
William was the son of Reginald de Warenne, a royal justice and Sheriff of Sussex. His mother Alice had been heiress to the feudal baron of Wormegay in Norfolk, and it passed to William following his father's death.

== Royal service ==
Warenne was one of a group of justices – including Richard Barre, Ralph Foliot, Richard Herriard, and William of Sainte-Mère-Église – who were appointed in 1194 by the Lord Chancellor Hubert Walter as justices for a new general eyre, to relieve the Barons of the Exchequer of some of their judicial duties. In 1195 Warenne served as a royal justice at Oxford with Hubert Walter, William Brewer and Geoffrey of Buckland. Warenne served again as a justice in 1198–1199 and then again during the first two years of the reign of John. His last service as a justice was in 1200. In 1200 John removed Warenne as a royal justice and appointed him as one of the four Justices for the Jews, replacing Simon of Pattishall. These officials had been created in 1194 and were not concerned with judicial matters concerning Jews, but rather with the collection of debts owed to Jews by Christians. (Note: This was of interest to the king because all debts owed to a Jew escheated to the king when the Jew died.) Warenne continued in that office until 1209. Besides judicial duties, Warenne also served in other capacities, working with Barre and Osbert fitzHervey to collect the carucage in 1194 in eastern England. In 1199 he again served with Barre and fitzHervey to impose amercements in the counties of Cambridge, Northamptonshire, Huntingdonshire, Norfolk and Suffolk.

As a reward for his service, Warenne was given custody of a number of lands confiscated from Prince John, including the Honour of Gloucester, which Warenne administered for the royal government from 1194 to 1196 during the captivity of King Richard I. He also received as a further mark of royal favour the wardships of various minor heirs. In 1194 Warenne was given custody of the heir of Hugh de Chandos, in return for which he gave the king 40 marks. Warenne's career was closely tied to Hubert Walter's, who promoted his career as a justice. Besides his royal service, Walter employed Warenne as a justice on ecclesiastical matters and sent him in 1194 to York to deal with complaints by the cathedral chapter of York Minster against their archbishop, Geoffrey. A sign of further ties between the two was that Warenne served as a witness on Walter's charters founding a monastery at West Dereham.

== Marriage and family ==
Warenne offered King John 500 marks for licence to marry Melisent, the widow of Richard de Montfichet and mother of Richard de Montfichet, lord of the manor of Stansted in Essex. Warenne's only surviving child and sole-heiress was his daughter, Beatrice, whom he married to Doun Bardolf, the holder of a one-half moiety of the feudal barony of Shelford in Nottinghamshire. Beatrice married secondly Ralph, and thirdly Hubert de Burgh. Beatrice had a son, William Bardolf, by her first marriage, who became the eventual heir of his maternal grandfather. Bardolf's rights to the barony were controlled by Beatrice's third husband, who did not relinquish them until his death in 1243.

== Death and legacy ==
Warenne died in 1209 and was buried in St Mary Overy Priory (now Southwark Cathedral) in Southwark, Surrey. Warenne also founded Wormegay Priory, Norfolk, a house of Augustinian monks. He gave gifts to the priory of St Mary Overy, to Carrow Abbey where one of his sisters was a nun, and to Lewes Priory, where his father had become a monk shortly before his death.
