= Hubert Walter =

Archbishop of Canterbury (1193–1205) and Lord Chancellor (1199–1205)

- Archbishop of Canterbury
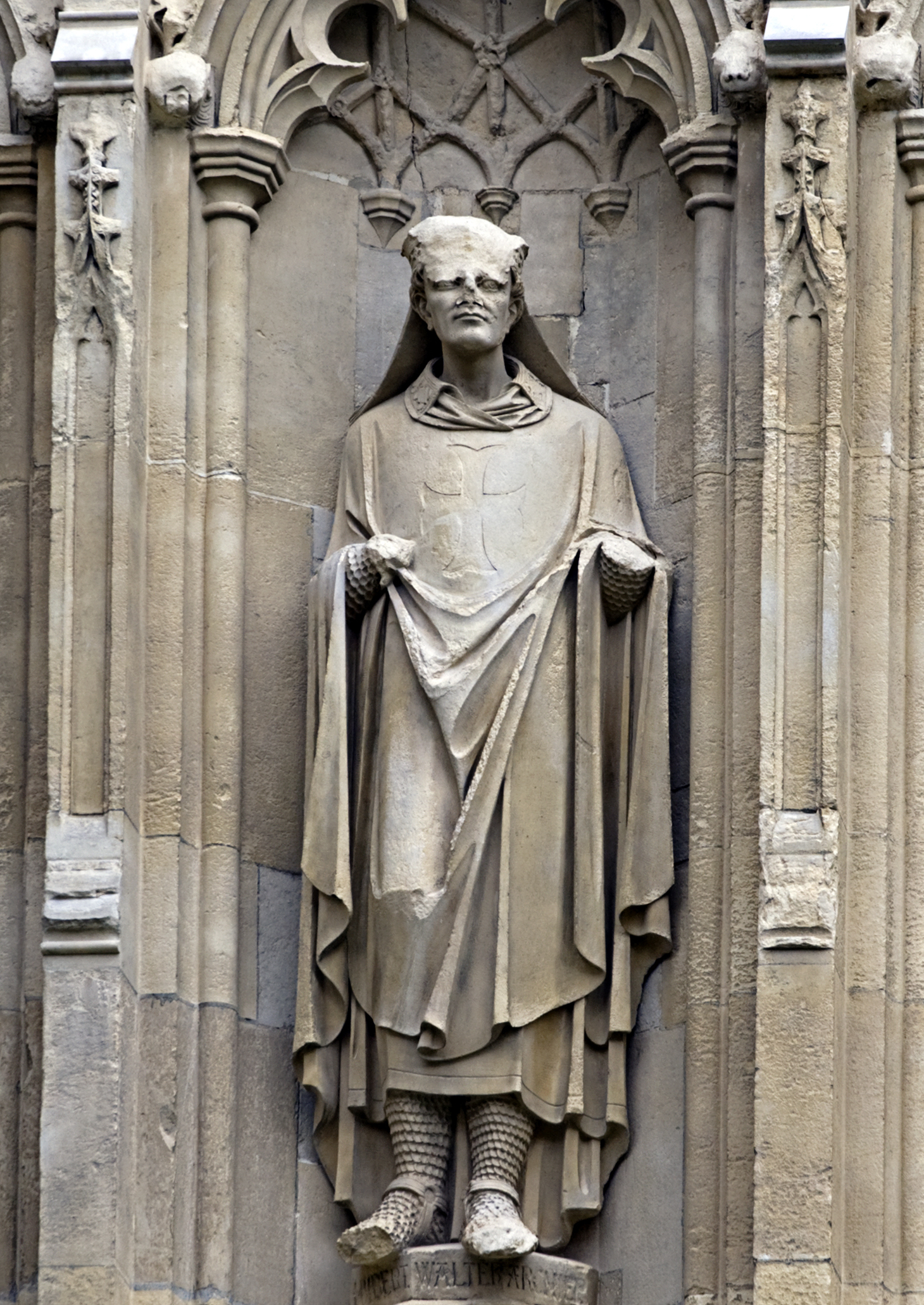
- Statue of Hubert Walter from the exterior of Canterbury Cathedral
- Elected: 29 May 1193
- Installed: 7 November 1193
- Term ended: 13 July 1205
- Predecessor: Reginald fitzJocelin (elected but died before consecration)
- Successor: Reginald
- Other post: Bishop of Salisbury

Orders
- Consecration: 22 October 1189

Personal details
- Born: c. 1160
- Died: 13 July 1205
- Buried: Trinity Chapel in Canterbury Cathedral
- Parents: Hervey Walter; Maud de Valoignes

Chief Justiciar of England
- In office 1193–1198
- Monarch: Richard I
- Preceded by: Walter de Coutances
- Succeeded by: Geoffrey fitzPeter

24th Lord Chancellor
- In office 1199–1205
- Monarch: John
- Preceded by: Eustace
- Succeeded by: Walter de Gray

Baron of the Exchequer
- In office 1184–1185
- Monarch: Henry II

Hubert Walter (c. 1160 – 13 July 1205) was an influential royal adviser in the late twelfth and early thirteenth centuries in the positions of Chief Justiciar of England, Archbishop of Canterbury, and Lord Chancellor. As chancellor, Walter began the keeping of the Charter Roll, a record of all charters issued by the chancery. Walter was not noted for his holiness in life or learning, but historians have judged him one of the most outstanding government ministers in English history.

Walter owed his early advancement to his uncle Ranulf de Glanvill, who helped him become a clerk of the Exchequer. Walter served King Henry II of England in many ways, not just in financial administration, but also including diplomatic and judicial efforts. After an unsuccessful candidacy to the see of York, Walter was elected Bishop of Salisbury shortly after the accession of Henry's son Richard I.

Walter accompanied Richard on the Third Crusade and was one of the principal figures in raising Richard's ransom after the king was captured in Germany on his return from the Holy Land. As a reward for his faithful service, Walter was selected to become Archbishop of Canterbury in 1193. He also served as Richard's justiciar until 1198, in which role he was responsible for raising the money Richard needed to prosecute his wars in France. Walter set up a system that was the precursor for the modern justices of the peace, based on selecting four knights in each hundred to administer justice. He also revived his predecessor's dispute over setting up a church to rival Christ Church Priory in Canterbury, which was only settled when the pope ordered him to abandon the plan. Following Richard's death in 1199, Walter helped assure the elevation of Richard's brother John to the throne. Walter also served John as a diplomat, undertaking several missions to France.

== Early life ==
Hubert Walter was the son of Hervey Walter and his wife Maud de Valoignes, one of the daughters (and co-heiresses) of Theobald de Valoignes, who was lord of Parham in Suffolk. Walter was one of six brothers. The eldest brother, Theobald Walter, and Walter himself, were helped in their careers by their uncle, Ranulf de Glanvill. (Note: Although the Complete Peerage lists Theobald as the eldest brother, other historians are not so sure that he was eldest.) Glanvill was the chief justiciar for Henry II; and was married to Maud de Valoignes' sister, Bertha. Walter's father and paternal grandfather held lands in Suffolk and Norfolk, which were inherited by Theobald. A younger brother, Osbert, became a royal justice and died in 1206. Roger, Hamo (or Hamon), and Bartholomew only appear as witnesses to charters.

Walter's family was from West Dereham in Norfolk, which is probably where Walter was born. Walter first appears in Glanvill's household in a charter that has been dated to 1178, although as it is undated,ce it may have been written as late as 1180. His brother Theobald also served in their uncle's household. Walter's gratitude towards his aunt and uncle is shown in the foundation charter of Walter's monastery in Dereham, where he asks the foundation to pray for the "souls of Ranulf Glanvill and Bertha his wife, who nourished us". Earlier historians asserted that Walter studied law at Bologna, based on his name appearing in a list of those to be commemorated at a monastery in Bologna in which English students lodged. Modern historians have discounted this, as the list also includes benefactors, not just students; other evidence points to the fact that Walter had a poor grasp of Latin, and did not consider himself to be a learned man. However, this did not mean that he was illiterate, merely that he was not "book-learned", or educated at a university. His contemporary, the medieval writer Gerald of Wales said of Walter that the Exchequer was his school.

== Early assignments ==
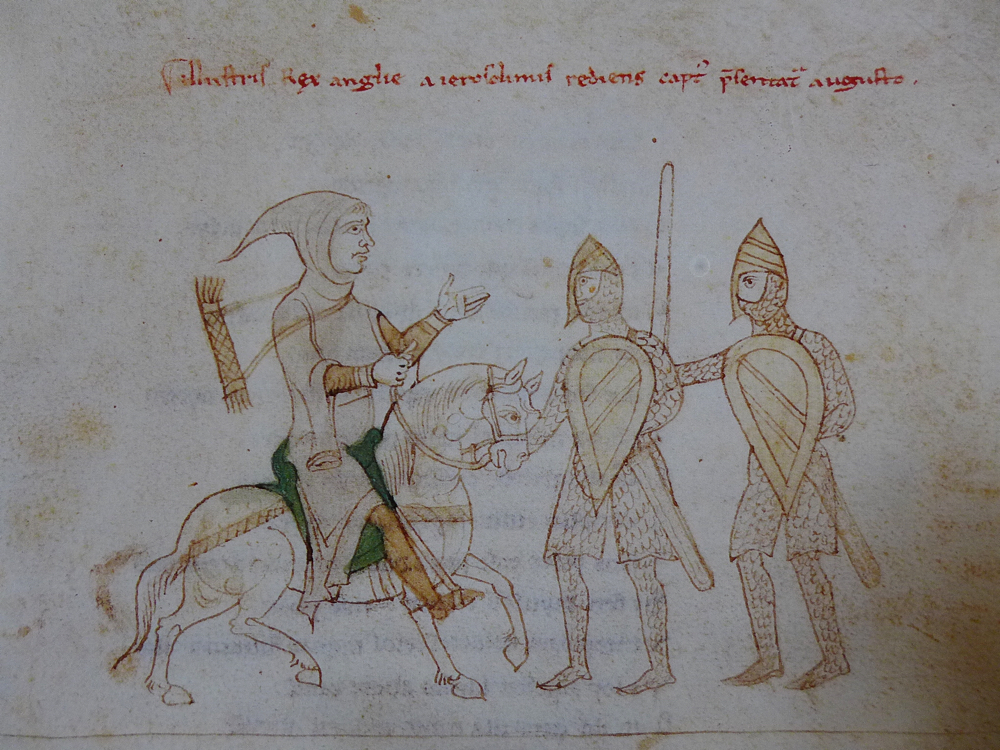
The capture of King Richard I from the Chronicle of Petrus de Ebulo, 1197

By 1184–1185, Walter had a position as a baron of the exchequer. The king employed him on several tasks, including as a negotiator, a justice, and a royal secretary. He was appointed Dean of York by order of King Henry II about July 1186. The archbishopric had been vacant since 1181 and would remain so until 1189, so it was Walter's job as dean to administer the archbishopric of York. Walter was also an unsuccessful candidate to become Archbishop of York in September 1186. (Note: The cathedral chapter at York presented five possible candidates to the king for his approval, but all five were rejected. It is not clear why all the names were rejected, but quite possibly it had nothing to do with the suitability of the candidates and rather stemmed from the king's desire to keep the see vacant to continue receiving the income of York, which went to the king when a see was vacant.) The medieval chronicler Gervase of Canterbury said that during Henry II's reign, Walter "ruled England because Glanvill sought his counsel". Documents also show that Walter was active in the administration of the diocese of York.

At the same time he was administering York, Walter founded a Premonstratensian house of canons on purchased property at West Dereham, Norfolk in 1188. His uncle and other family members had favoured the Premonstratensian Order, and this West Dereham Abbey was located near the family lands in Norfolk.

In 1187, Walter, along with Glanvill and King Henry II, attempted to mediate a dispute between the Archbishop of Canterbury, Baldwin of Forde, and the monks of the cathedral chapter. Their efforts were fruitless, and Walter was later drawn back into the dispute in early 1189 and again as archbishop. The dispute centred on Baldwin's attempt to build a church dedicated to Saint Thomas Becket just outside the town of Canterbury. The plan was to staff the church with canons instead of monks, which the monks of Canterbury's cathedral chapter feared was an attempt to take away the cathedral chapter's right to elect the archbishop. The attempt in 1189 was settled by Baldwin giving up the site near Canterbury for one further away at Lambeth, which was less threatening to the monks.

== Bishop and archbishop ==
After the death of King Henry in 1189, the new king Richard appointed Walter Bishop of Salisbury; the election took place on 15 September 1189 at Pipewell, with the consecration on 22 October 1189 at Westminster. Also elected to bishoprics at this council were Godfrey de Lucy to the see of Winchester, Richard FitzNeal to the see of London, and William Longchamp to the see of Ely. The elevation of so many new bishops was probably meant to signal the new king's break with his father's habit of keeping bishoprics empty to retain the revenues of the sees. (Note: This process of appropriating the revenues of a vacant see was known as regalian right.) At about the same time, Glanvill was either forced out of his justiciarship or resigned, but the sources are unclear. Walter was probably elevated to a bishopric even though his uncle had lost some of his power because of political manoeuvring over the elevation of King Richard's illegitimate half-brother Geoffrey to the see of York, which Walter had at first opposed. The bishopric was either a reward or a bribe for Walter's withdrawal of his objections to Geoffrey's election. (Note: Geoffrey was elected to York partly in fulfilment of King Henry's dying wish, and partly to place Geoffrey in holy orders and thus unable to contest for the English crown. However, the cathedral chapter had elected Walter shortly before Geoffrey's appointment, and for a short while, Walter appealed to Rome.)

Soon after his appointment, Walter accompanied the king on the Third Crusade, going ahead of the king directly from Marseille to the Holy Land in a group that included Baldwin of Forde, Archbishop of Canterbury, and Ranulf de Glanvill. The group left Marseille in August 1190, and arrived at Acre two months later. While on crusade, he was praised by his fellow crusaders, and acted as Richard's principal negotiator with Saladin for a peace treaty. After the conclusion of the treaty with Saladin, Walter was in the first band of pilgrims that entered Jerusalem. Saladin entertained Walter during his stay in Jerusalem, and the Englishman succeeded in extracting a promise from Saladin that a small group of Western clergy would be allowed to remain in the city to perform divine services. Walter subsequently led the English army back to England after Richard departed from Palestine, but in Sicily he heard of the king's capture, and diverted to Germany. He, along with William of Sainte-Mère-Eglise, was among the first of Richard's subjects to find the king at Ochsenfurt, where he was being held. In April 1193, he returned to England to raise the king's ransom. Richard wrote to his mother, Eleanor of Aquitaine, that Walter should be chosen for the see of Canterbury, as well as to the monks of the cathedral chapter, and soon after Walter's return to England, he was duly elected archbishop of Canterbury, having been translated to the see on 29 May 1193. He was chosen as archbishop without consultation from the bishops, who normally claimed the right to help decide the new archbishop. He received his pallium, the symbol of his archiepiscopal authority, from Pope Celestine III and was ceremonially enthroned at Canterbury on 7 November 1193.

== Justiciar ==
After Richard was freed, he spent little time in England, instead concentrating on the war with King Philip II of France, which began with Philip's attempts to acquire Richard's possessions on the continent. Richard made Walter Chief Justiciar on about 25 December 1193. Walter remained in England, raising money for the king's wars and overseeing the administration of the kingdom. The constant warfare forced Walter to find new means of raising money through taxation. The historian Doris Stenton wrote that the Pipe Rolls, or financial records, during Walter's time as justiciar "give the impression of a country taxed to the limit". Walter was also responsible for choosing royal justices, and many of his choices were connected with, or had previously worked with, the archbishop in the royal administration. Because of Richard's absence from England, Walter was able to exercise more authority as justiciar than any of his predecessors. All that Walter needed to do was keep Richard's monetary needs satisfied. Combined with Walter's position as archbishop, Walter wielded a power unseen in England since the days of Lanfranc.

One of Walter's first acts as justiciar was in February 1194, when he presided over a feudal judgement of John, Richard's younger brother. After Richard's release from captivity, John, intending to begin a rebellion, had prepared his castles for defence. His letters ordering the preparations were intercepted, and John was deprived of his lands. When John showed no signs of submitting, Walter called an ecclesiastical council at Westminster for the purposes of excommunicating John unless he submitted. John refused to submit, and was excommunicated. To defeat the rebellion, Walter was required to lay siege to Marlborough Castle himself. Walter employed his brother Theobald in similar actions in Lancaster, and rewarded him with the office of sheriff of Lancaster. Eventually in May 1194, John made peace with Richard, and was restored to favour, although the restoration of his lands did not occur until late in 1195.

Walter's chief administrative measures were his instructions to the itinerant justices of 1194 and 1198, his 1195 ordinance to increase order in the kingdom, and his 1198 plan for the assessment of a land tax. In 1194, the justices were ordered by a document now known as the Articles of Eyre to secure the election of four coroners by each county court. The coroners were to keep, or register, royal pleas, which had previously been a duty of the sheriff. The juries were to be chosen by a committee of four knights, also elected by the county court. This introduction of coroners and constables eventually led to a change in the role of sheriffs, and a lessening of their importance in royal administration. Although he probably did not take part in the decision to set up a special exchequer for the collection of Richard's ransom, Walter did appoint the two escheators, or guardians of the amounts due, who were Hugh Bardulf in the north of England and William of Sainte-Mère-Eglise in the south. His instructions for the eyre, or circuits of traveling justices, are the first that survive in English history. It was during his tenure of the justiciarship that the judicial role of the Exchequer became separated from the purely financial aspects.

He also worked to introduce order into the lending of money by Jewish moneylenders, and organised a system where the royal officials worked to combat fraud by both parties in the business of Jewish money lending. Walter was probably the originator of the custom of keeping an archival copy of all charters, letters, patents and feet of fines, or record of agreements reached in the royal courts, in the chancery. The first recorded "foot of the fine" is endorsed with the statement "This is the first chirograph that was made in the king's court in the form of three chirographs, according to the command of his lordship of Canterbury and other barons of the king, to the end that by this form a record can be made to be passed on to the treasurer to put in the treasury." The agreement concerns Walter's brother Theobald, who was the plaintiff. (Note: There were precedents for such recording, as in 1166, King Henry II had ordered a third copy of the Constitutions of Clarendon be saved in the royal archives, and there were also Anglo-Saxon administrative precursors.)

Walter also helped create a more professional group of royal justices. Although the group, which included Simon of Pattishall, Ralph Foliot, Richard Barre, William de Warenne, Richard Herriard, and Walter's brother Osbert fitzHervey, had mostly already served as justices before Walter's term of office, it was Walter who used them extensively. It appears likely that Walter chose them for their ability, not for any familial ties to himself. This group of men replaced the previous system of using mostly local men, and are the first signs of a professional judiciary.

In 1195, Walter issued an ordinance by which four knights were appointed in every hundred to act as guardians of the peace, a precursor to the office of Justice of the Peace. His use of the knights, who appear for the first time in political life, is the first sign of the rise of this class, who, either as Members of Parliament (MPs) or justices of the peace, later became the mainstay of English government. In 1198, Walter requested a carucage, or plough-tax, of five shillings on every plough-land, or carucate, under cultivation. However, difficulties arose over the assessments, so the justiciar ordered them to be made by a sworn jury in every hundred. Those jurors were likely elected.

In foreign affairs, Walter negotiated with Scotland in 1195 and with the Welsh in 1197. Scotland claimed Northumbria, or northern England. Negotiations broke down, but relations between the two countries remained good throughout the rest of Richard's reign. Talks with the Welsh began after the English lords Roger Mortimer and William de Briouze expanded into Welsh territory in 1195, causing a concern that the Welsh lord Rhys ap Gruffydd would strike back across the border. In 1196, Walter quickly suppressed a popular uprising in London led by William Fitz Osbern. FitzOsbern was an orator who harnessed the discontent of the poor residents of London against high taxes. His oratory provoked a riot in London, and he was apprehended and hanged on Walter's orders.

== Ecclesiastical affairs and resignation ==
Walter held a legateship from Pope Celestine III from 1195 to 1198, which enabled him to act with the pope's delegated authority within the English Church. Walter actively investigated ecclesiastical misconduct, and deposed several abbots, including Robert of Thorney Abbey in 1195 and an abbot of St Mary's in the province of the Archbishop of York. At the monastic cathedral of Worcester, he disciplined the monks between the death of Henry de Sully and the election of John of Coutances, as was his right as the archbishop of the province. In his own diocese, he granted markets and fairs to towns, was granted the privilege of minting coins at Shrewsbury, and worked to recover lands and manors that had been lost to the archdiocese.

Walter revived the scheme of his predecessor, Baldwin of Forde, to found a church in Canterbury that would be secular and not monastic. He promised that the new foundation's canons would not be allowed to vote in archiepiscopal elections nor would the body of Saint Thomas Becket ever be moved to the new church, but the monks of his cathedral chapter were suspicious and appealed to the papacy. The dispute from the time of Baldwin of Forde flared up again, with the papacy supporting the monks and the king supporting the archbishop. Finally, Pope Innocent III ruled in favour of the monks and ordered Walter to destroy what had been built.

The archbishop held ecclesiastical councils, including one at York in 1195 that legislated that the clergy should collect their tithes in full, "...without any reduction". Another council was held at London in 1200 to legislate the size and composition of clerical retinues, and also ruled that the clergy, when saying Mass, should speak clearly and not speed up or slow down their speech. At the request of the papacy, Walter also led inquiries into the canonisations of Gilbert of Sempringham and Wulfstan of Worcester. Walter refused to acquiesce in the election of Gerald of Wales to the see of St David's in Wales and opposed the efforts of Gerald and others to elevate St David's to an archbishopric.

In the latter part of Richard's reign, the pressures mounted on Walter. Conflicts between his ecclesiastical duties and his government duties made him the target of criticism from both sides. A dispute in December 1197, over Richard's demand that the magnates of England provide 300 knights to serve in France, led to renewed grumbling among the clergy and barons. Richard was also dissatisfied with the results of the carucage in 1198, so Walter resigned his position of chief justiciar on 11 July of that year. Walter may have resigned willingly, as he had talked of resigning his secular duties since 1194. Some medieval sources, however, stated that he was forced out of office by the king.

== Under John ==
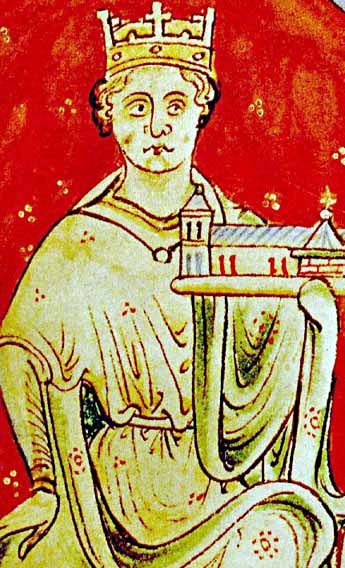
King John from the medieval manuscript, Historia Anglorum c. 1250–1259

According to the Life of William Marshal, which dates to soon after 1219, when word reached William Marshal, one of the richest and most influential barons, that Richard was dead, he consulted with Walter and discussed whom to support as the next king. Marshal's choice was John, but Walter initially leaned towards John's young nephew Arthur of Brittany. When Marshall was insistent on John, who was an adult, the author of the Life has Walter say in reply, "'So be it then,' said the archbishop, 'but mark my words, Marshal, you will never regret anything in your life as much as this.'" This is almost certainly a retrospective comment that has been inserted into the biography, however, based on John's later behaviour. Once John knew he had the support of Walter and William Marshal, he sent Walter ahead to England to request all free men to pledge fealty to the new king. On 27 May 1199 Walter crowned John, supposedly making a speech that promulgated, for the last time, the theory of a king's election by the people. This story is only contained in the writings of Matthew Paris, however, and although it seems certain that Walter made a speech, it is not certain what the exact contents were. On his coronation day, John appointed Walter Lord Chancellor. W. L. Warren, historian and author of a biography of John, says of Walter that "No one living had a firmer grasp of the intricacies of royal government, yet even in old age his mind was adaptable and fecund with suggestions for coping with new problems."

One of Walter's first suggestions was to lower the fees for having charters confirmed, from nine pounds and five shillings to eighteen shillings and four pence. Accompanying this measure was a requirement that no charter be accepted in a king's court unless confirmed by King John. Not only did this reduce forgeries, but it also led to the establishment of the Charter Roll, an administrative copy of all charters issued and confirmed by the government. In his relations with other officers, Walter worked closely with the justiciar Geoffrey Fitz Peter, on the collection of taxation, and both men went to Wales in 1203 on a diplomatic mission. Another joint action of the two men concerned a tax of a seventh part of all movables collected from both lay and ecclesiastical persons. The medieval chronicler Roger of Wendover said that the king "had Archbishop Hubert of Canterbury to act for him in the matter of the church property, Geoffrey fitz-Peter in the matter of lay property; and these two spared no one in carrying out their orders." Walter was also responsible for the keeping of copies of other royal letters in the Close Rolls and the Patent Rolls. The Patent rolls record letters that were issued in "patent", or openly and not sealed, and the Close rolls record letters issued sealed, or letters close. The various rolls are extant from 1199 for the Charter roll, 1201 for the Patent roll, and 1204 for the Close roll. Walter also continued to innovate in local government, as the earliest record of the coroner's rolls, or county records, being used to cross-check oral testimony in the county courts dates from 1202 and 1203, during Walter's chancellorship.

In 1201, Walter went on a diplomatic mission to Philip II of France, which was unsuccessful, and in 1202, he returned to England as regent while John was abroad. In April 1204 Walter returned to France with John de Gray the Bishop of Norwich, Eustace the Bishop of Ely, William Marshal, and Robert de Beaumont the Earl of Leicester to seek peace with Philip Augustus. Philip insisted that John hand over Arthur of Brittany, Arthur's sister Eleanor, and renounce all of his continental possessions before the French king would make peace. John refused to do this, and the embassy returned to England not long before Philip conquered Normandy.

Besides sending Walter on diplomatic missions, King John gave Walter custody of Rochester Castle on 20 July 1202, but as Walter was already accounting for the taxes and fees of the city of Rochester to the Exchequer in 1200, it is possible that he held the castle before 1202. John also upheld the right of the archbishop to mint coins, which Walter held until his death in 1205.

Under John, Walter continued to be active in ecclesiastical affairs, and in September 1200 held a provincial church council at London. This council set forth 14 canons, or decrees, which dealt with a number of subjects, including doctrinal concerns, financial affairs, and the duties of the clergy. It drew heavily on earlier church decrees, including those of the Third Lateran Council of 1179. Walter also interceded with Pope Innocent III in 1200, mediating between the pope and the king over a royal dispute with the Cistercians. Walter's intercession prevented the dispute from escalating, and kept the pope from imposing sanctions on the king for his threats to the Cistercians. It was in 1200 that the church court records of the archdiocese of Canterbury began to be recorded and kept, although after Walter's death in 1205 the records become sparse until the 14th century.

== Death and legacy ==
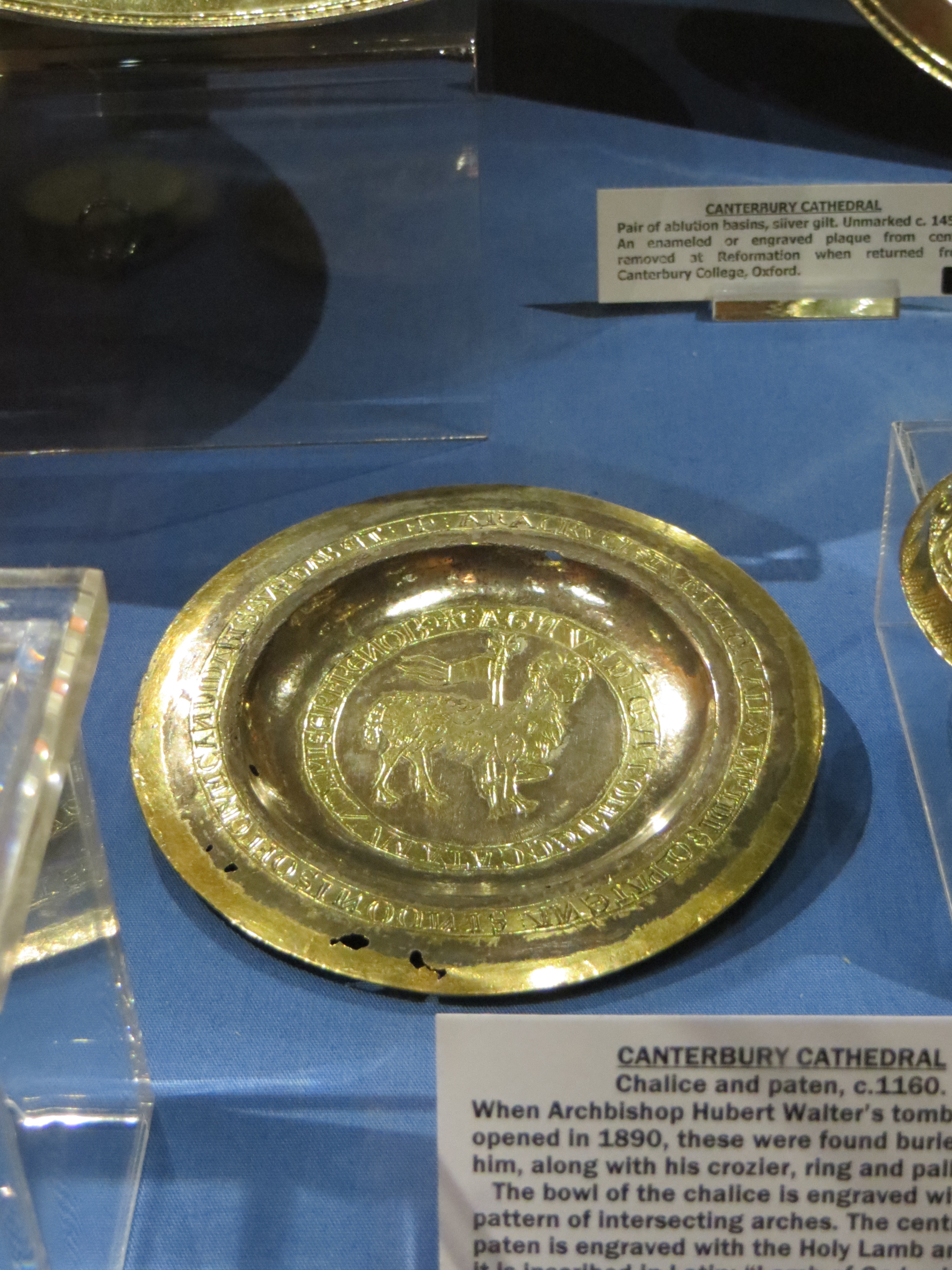
Walter's tomb was opened in 1890 and his pair of buskins, crozier, paten (illustrated here) and chalice were discovered.

Walter died on 13 July 1205 from a septic carbuncle on his back. The lingering character of his ailment permitted a reconciliation with his monks. The medieval chronicler Ralph of Coggeshall described his death as taking four days, and related that he gave vestments, jewellery, and altar furnishings to his monks, which were confiscated by King John after Walter's death. He was buried in the Trinity Chapel in Canterbury Cathedral, next to Thomas Becket, where his tomb can still be seen. (Note: The tomb may have been built by William the Englishman, who designed the Trinity Chapel in Canterbury Cathedral.) The tomb occupied a highly visible spot in the Trinity Chapel, and Walter was the first archbishop to be buried there since the 1170s, when all of the tombs but Becket's had been relocated to focus attention on Becket's shrine. He remained the only ecclesiastic to be buried there until the 14th century. The use by the archbishops of Canterbury of the title "Primate of All England" dates from Walter's archepiscopal tenure.

The medieval chronicler Matthew Paris retold the story that when King John heard of Walter's death, the king exclaimed, "Now for the first time I am king of England." This story, however entertaining, is apocryphal. More secure is the story that another chronicler, Roger of Wendover, relates about Walter's Christmas celebrations in 1200. Roger reports that Walter distributed clothing to those attending his Christmas feast, which angered King John. The chronicler says that Walter "wished to put himself on a par with the king".

Walter was not a holy man, although he was, as John Gillingham, a historian and biographer of Richard I, says, "one of the most outstanding government ministers in English History". Hugh of Lincoln, a contemporary and later canonised, is said to have asked forgiveness of God for not having rebuked Walter as often as he probably should have. Modern historians tend not to share the older view that Walter was the driving force behind the administrative changes during Richard's reign, that Richard was uninterested in government, and that he left all decisions in the hands of his ministers, especially Longchamp and Walter. The studies of James Holt and others have shown that Richard was highly involved in government decisions, and that it was more a partnership between the king and his ministers. Walter was, however, very innovative in his approach to government. Walter continued to enjoy the support of Richard's brother John, and it was during John's reign that a number of Walter's administrative reforms took place, although how much royal initiative was behind the innovations is unknown, given John's interest in government and administration.

Walter was the butt of jokes about his lack of learning, and was the target of a series of tales from the pen of the chronicler Gerald of Wales. Even Walter's supporters could only state that he was "moderately literate". Walter employed several canon lawyers who had been educated at Bologna in his household, including John of Tynemouth, Simon of Southwell, and Honorius of Kent. He also employed the architect Elias of Dereham, who was one of Walter's executors. Elias is traditionally credited as being the architect of Salisbury Cathedral after Walter's death. Another scholar employed by Walter was Peter of Blois, who served both Walter and his predecessor as a Latin secretary.

Little is known of his appearance, although he was described by Gerald of Wales as tall and handsome. Gerald also praised his intelligence and cleverness.

W. L. Warren advances the theory that either Walter or Geoffrey Fitz Peter, instead of Ranulf Glanvill, was the author of Tractatus de legibus et consuetudinibus regni Angliae, a legal treatise on the laws and constitutions of the English. Chrimes agrees that Glanvill was probably not the author, and feels that Walter likely was, although he could not be certain. If he was the author, he composed what Chrimes called a "great literary memorial of Henry II's government". Neither of Walter's two modern biographers, however, feel that he was the author of the Tractatus, and the historian Ralph Turner agrees. The historian Michael Clanchy says of Walter "The proliferation of documents was a European and a continuing phenomenon, yet if it were to be associated in England with one man, he would be Hubert Walter."

== Citations ==
Political offices
Preceded by Eustace	Lord Chancellor; 1199–1205	Succeeded by Walter de Gray
Preceded by Walter de Coutances	Chief Justiciar; 1193–1198	Succeeded by Geoffrey Fitz Peter
Catholic Church titles
Preceded by Josceline de Bohon	Bishop of Salisbury; 1189–1193	Succeeded by Herbert Poore
Preceded by Reginald Fitz Jocelin	Archbishop of Canterbury; 1193–1205	Succeeded by Reginald
