= William de Cornhill =

13th-century Bishop of Coventry

- Bishop of Coventry
- Elected: c. 9 July 1214
- Term ended: resigned before death in August 1223
- Predecessor: Geofrey de Muschamp
- Successor: Alexander de Stavenby
- Other post: Archdeacon of Huntingdon

Orders
- Consecration: 25 January 1215

Personal details
- Died: August 1223
- Buried: Lichfield Cathedral
- Denomination: Catholic

William de Cornhill (or William of Cornhill; died 1223) was a medieval Bishop of Coventry.

Some sources say William was the son of Henry de Cornhill, who was sheriff of London from 1187 to 1189 and was a brother to Reginald de Cornhill, one of John's chief administrators. Other sources say that William was either Reginald's son or nephew. William served King John of England as a financial administrator, and in 1206 he the custodian of Malmesbury Abbey and the see of Winchester and the see of Lincoln. He was archdeacon of Huntingdon by 1209, when he was serving as a royal justice. In 1212 he once more served as a royal justice. He was elected bishop about 9 July 1214, and consecrated on 25 January 1215. His election involved the monks of Coventry refusing to allow the canons of Lichfield participate in the election, and then the monks rejected a number of candidates before finally settling on William. The monks objected most to the fact that the papal legate, Niccolò de Romanis, cardinal bishop of Tusculum, repeatedly urged them to elect the abbot of Beaulieu, who was the choice of King John. Eventually, the monks were allowed to elect another royal clerk, William. He was consecrated at Reading, England by Stephen Langton, the Archbishop of Canterbury. William was present at Runnymede and was one of the advisors to John about Magna Carta. He also attended the Third Lateran Council in 1215 and was present at the first coronation of King Henry III of England in 1216. He may have resigned before his death on 19 August or 20 August 1223, as he had suffered a stroke in 1221 and lost the power of speech. He was buried in Lichfield Cathedral.

== Citations ==
Catholic Church titles
Preceded by Geofrey de Muschamp	Bishop of Coventry; 1214–1223	Succeeded by Alexander de Stavenby
