= Baron Hoo =

Baron Hoo may refer to

- Baron Hoo, a subsidiary Jacobite title of the Earl of Jersey
- Thomas Hoo, Baron Hoo and Hastings (ca. 1396-1455)
- Hugh Bardulf, Baron of Hoo (ca. 1139-ca. 1203)
