= Geoffrey de Muschamp =

12th and 13th-century Bishop of Coventry

- Bishop of Coventry
- Appointed: before 21 June 1198
- Term ended: 1208
- Predecessor: Hugh Nonant
- Successor: William de Cornhill
- Other post: Archdeacon of Cleveland

Orders
- Consecration: 21 June 1198 by Hubert Walter

Personal details
- Died: 6 October 1208
- Buried: Lichfield Cathedral
- Denomination: Catholic

Geoffrey de Muschamp (died 6 October 1208) was a medieval Bishop of Coventry.

Muschamp began his ecclesiastical career under Geoffrey, Archbishop of York, who appears to have used his office of chancellor to promote Muschamp to the archdeaconry of Cleveland after the death of King Henry II of England. This irregular use of the office came to light five years later, and Muschamp had to pay a fine of £100 to King Richard I of England to retain the office. Muschamp opposed his former employer in the archbishop's dispute with the cathedral chapter of York Minster. He was consecrated on 21 June 1198 at Canterbury by Hubert Walter, Archbishop of Canterbury. Around 1200 he built Eccleshall Castle as a secure central residence for the bishops of the Diocese of Lichfield.

Muschamp died on 6 October 1208 and was buried in Lichfield Cathedral.

== Citations ==
Catholic Church titles
Preceded by Hugh Nonant	Bishop of Coventry; 1198–1208	Succeeded by William de Cornhill
