= Gerard la Pucelle =

12th-century Bishop of Coventry

- Bishop of Coventry
- Appointed: January 1183
- Term ended: 1184
- Predecessor: Richard Peche
- Successor: Hugh Nonant

Personal details
- Born: c. 1117
- Died: 13 January 1184
- Buried: Coventry Cathedral
- Denomination: Catholic

Gerard la Pucelle (sometimes Gerard Pucelle; c. 1117 – 13 January 1184) was a peripatetic Anglo-French scholar of canon law, clerk, and Bishop of Coventry.

== Life ==
Gerard was possibly born in England, taught canon law (Note: leges et decreta according to John of Salisbury) at the University of Paris in the 1150s, when the study of the discipline of the Church was first differentiated from theology, spurred by the collections of church decretals that began with the Decretum Gratiani assembled by a monk at the University of Bologna. Among his surviving texts are glosses on the Decretum manuscripts to be found among the manuscripts of Durham Cathedral (Note: Manuscript (MS) C.III.1 marked with the siglum "Ger.") and glosses in the Summa Lipsiensis, (Note: The collection of decretals with commentary, as used in Leipzig marked with the siglum "Magister G. Coventris Episcopus" ("Doctor G. Bishop of Coventry")) in the Summa Parisiensis, (Note: The decretals and commentaries collected at the University of Paris.) and elsewhere. Gerard added to the standard collection from which he taught. Among his pupils were Lucas of Hungary, Ralph Niger, master Richard, a certain Gervase who retired to Durham, and the English scholar Walter Map.

Gerard was a member of Thomas Becket's entourage, his extended familia, and a close friend of John of Salisbury. After Becket went into exile, Gerard taught for a while in Paris before he undertook a mission to the Empire in 1165/66 even though Frederick Barbarossa was under a ban of excommunication. Between 1165 and 1168 he taught at Cologne, and held a prebend at that city. In 1168 Gerard returned to England and took the oath of fealty to Henry II, which Becket had rejected.

From about 1174 Gerard was once again in England, serving as a principal clerk to Becket's successor as Archbishop of Canterbury, Richard of Dover. He was also with Peter of Blois for a time in Rome, where he represented Archbishop Richard before the Curia. In 1179, Gerard attended the Third Lateran Council as the archbishop's representative. From there, he may have returned to Cologne to teach for a bit, but by 1181 Gerard had returned to England.

Perhaps already a canon, in January 1183, Gerard was appointed Bishop of Coventry, (Note: The diocese was combined with that of Lichfield, 1121–1188.) which made him the vassal of Henry II of England, (Note: Throughout the latter part of the twelfth and early part of the thirteenth century, the bishop owed the service of fifteen knights.) but he died the following year on 13 January 1184 at Coventry. Some suspected that Gerard was poisoned. He was buried in Coventry Cathedral.

== Citations ==
Catholic Church titles
Preceded by Richard Peche	Bishop of Coventry; 1183–1184	Succeeded by Hugh Nonant
