= Alexander de Stavenby =

13th-century Bishop of Coventry

- Bishop of Coventry and Lichfield
- Appointed: c. 13 April 1224
- Term ended: 26 December 1238
- Predecessor: William de Cornhill
- Successor: William de Raley

Orders
- Consecration: 14 April 1224

Personal details
- Died: 26 December 1238 Andover, Hampshire
- Buried: Lichfield Cathedral
- Denomination: Catholic

Alexander de Stavenby (or Alexander of Stainsby; died 26 December 1238) was a medieval Bishop of Coventry and Lichfield.

Alexander was probably a native of Stainsby, Lincolnshire, and had two brothers, William and Gilbert, who held land there. He may have studied under Stephen Langton, later Archbishop of Canterbury, as Langton was from a village less than 10 miles away. Alexander taught theology at Toulouse before his appointment to the episcopate. He may have been a teacher of Dominic, the founder of the Dominican Order, at Toulouse. He also taught at Bologna and was named a chamber clerk for Pope Honorius III. Alexander was nominated as bishop about 13 April 1224, and consecrated on 14 April 1224.

While bishop Alexander urged the people in his diocese to receive Communion three times a year. He also issued rules to prohibit his clergy from entering a tavern. He wrote a set of statutes for his diocese, which survive, along with other works. Only two of the other works survive, one on confession and another on the seven deadly sins. While he was bishop, both Coventry and Lichfield were named as the seats of the see, with the election of a new bishop taking place by the chapters of Coventry or Lichfield in rotation.

Alexander served Henry III of England as a diplomat, undertaking many missions to Rome and France on behalf of the king. He also negotiated with envoys for Frederick II, Holy Roman Emperor at Antwerp and spent time in Wales trying to renew truces. In 1234, the bishop was accused of supporting Richard Marshall's rebellion, but he cleared his name before the court. Alexander was opposed to the administration of Peter des Roches and at one point excommunicated those whom he called the "king's true enemies", which many took to include Roches.

Alexander died on 26 December 1238 at Andover, Hampshire, and was buried in Lichfield Cathedral. A chantry was established in his memory near the altar of Saint Chad.

== Citations ==
Catholic Church titles
Preceded by William de Cornhill	Bishop of Coventry and Lichfield; 1224–1238	Succeeded by William de Raley
