= Richard de Montfichet =

Anglo-Norman nobleman

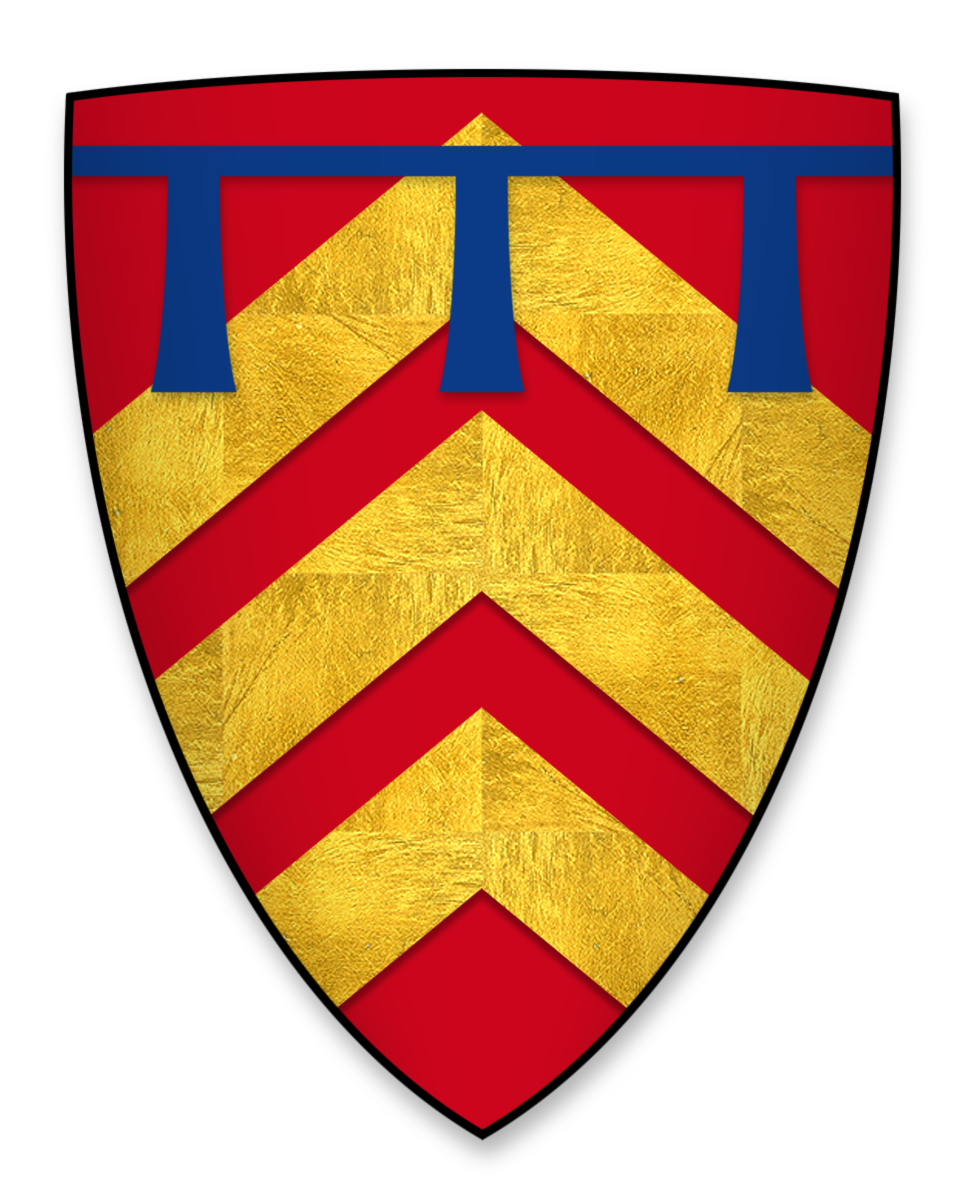
Arms of Richard de Montfichet, at the time of the signing of Magna Charta

Richard de Montfichet (or Richard de Munfichet) (died 1267) was a Magna Carta surety. He was a landowner in Essex.

== Life ==
He was the son of another Richard de Montfichet, whom Henry II made forester of Essex. Richard the elder was the son of Gilbert, who married Avelina de Lucy, daughter of Richard de Luci. Richard the elder was the grandson of William de Montfichet, founder of the abbey of Stratford-Langton Essex; he was with Richard I in Normandy in 1195, was sheriff of Essex and Hertfordshire in 1202, and died the next year, leaving one son by his wife Milisent. William de Warenne offered King John 500 marks for a licence to marry the widow Melisent.

The young Richard was then about ten years old, and was at first a ward of Roger de Lacy (1170-1211). He appears as witnessing several charters in 1214, and on 21 June 1215 received charge of the forests of Essex as his by hereditary right. He had nevertheless acted previously with the baronial party, and been present at the meeting at Stamford in March.

He was one of the twenty-five barons appointed to enforce the observance of Magna Carta, and as a prominent member of the party was excommunicated by the pope in 1216. He supported Louis VIII of France both before and after John's death, and fighting at Lincoln against William Marshal on 20 May 1217 was then taken prisoner. He returned to loyalty, and recovered his lands in the following October.

In 1223, his lands were again for a time seized by the king in consequence of his presence at a prohibited tournament at Blyth. In 1225, he was a justice-itinerant for Essex and Hertfordshire, and in the same year was a witness to the confirmation of Magna Carta. In 1234, he was admitted to sit as a baron of the exchequer, and in 1236 again witnessed the confirmation of the charter. He was justice of the forest for nineteen counties in 1237, and from 1242 to 1246 sheriff of Essex and Hertfordshire, the counties in which his estates lay.

Montfichet was one of the baronial representatives on the committee to consider the king's demand for a subsidy in 1244, and probably, therefore. had a share in drafting the remarkable scheme of reform of that year.

== Family ==
He married first Alice (fl. 1217), and then. Jousa or Joyce. He died in 1267 without issue, and his estates passed to the children of his three sisters. Montfichet is of chief note for his share in the struggle for the charter. He was the last survivor of the twenty-five; his age probably prevented his taking any part in the later barons' war, which he outlived.

== Notes ==
Attribution

This article incorporates text from a publication now in the public domain: Kingsford, Charles Lethbridge (1894). "Montfichet, Richard de". In Lee, Sidney (ed.). Dictionary of National Biography. Vol. 38. London: Smith, Elder & Co.
