= Articles of Eyre =

Coroner's office in England

The office of coroner was formally established in England by Article 20 of the Articles of Eyre in September 1194 to "keep the pleas of the Crown" (Latin, custos placitorum coronae) from which the word "coroner" is derived.

The eyre of 1194 was initiated under Hubert Walter's justiciarship to restore royal justice following the anarchy of Prince John's rebellion, which began when Richard I was detained in transit from the Third Crusade. Within two months, justices on eyre had visited every shire in England. Local knights were appointed coroners to record crown pleas to be presented to the justices. The motivation for this administrative reform was the need to raise money for King Richard's reconquest of Normandy. The coroners were also required to account for the wealth forfeited by the rebels and list the financial resources of each shire.
