= Henry de Longchamp =

Anglo-Norman administrator

Henry de Longchamp or Henry de Longo Campo (c. 1150–1212) was an Anglo-Norman administrator.

Henry was born in Wilton Castle, near Ross-on-Wye, Herefordshire, the son of Hugh de Longchamp. One of his brothers, William, was to become Chancellor of England and Bishop of Ely, and another, Osbert, Sheriff of Yorkshire and Norfolk.

Henry was appointed Sheriff of Herefordshire for 1190 by the new King Richard in place of Ralph Arden, again in 1193, and Sheriff of Worcestershire from 1195 to 1197. In 1194, he accompanied King Richard to Normandy. During Richard's captivity overseas, William de Longchamp lost power and Henry and Osbert their shrievalties. Henry spent time imprisoned in Cardiff Castle.

Henry died in Wilton in 1212. He had married Maude de Cantilupe, daughter of Walter de Cantilupe and sister of William de Cantilupe, in Wilton in 1182. They had several children, including William, Margaret, Henry, and Hugh. He was succeeded by his grandson Henry, the son of Hugh.
