= William de Longchamp =

12th-century chancellor and justiciar of England, Bishop of Ely

- Bishop of Ely
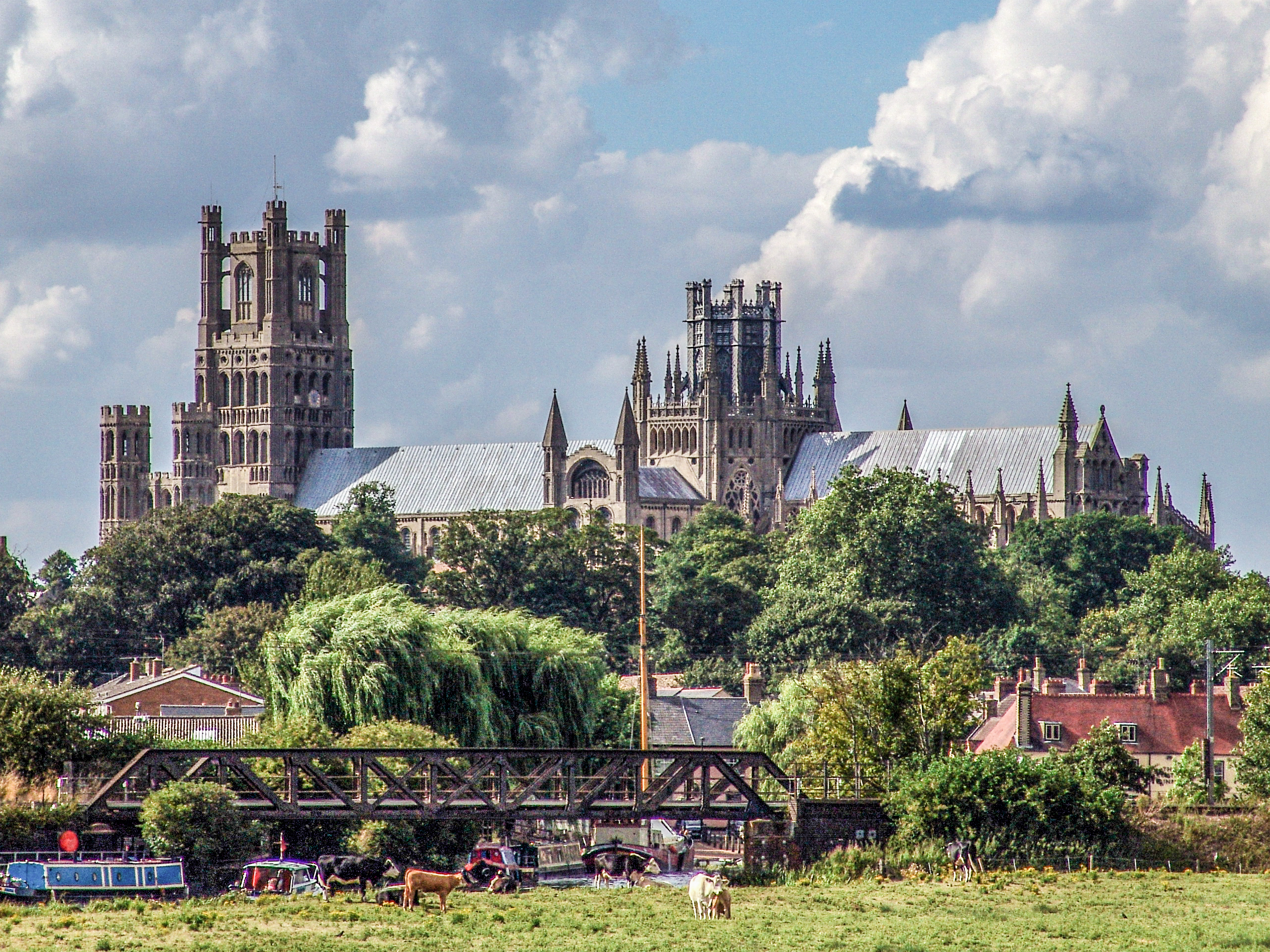
- Ely Cathedral
- Appointed: 15 September 1189
- Installed: 6 January 1190
- Term ended: January 1197
- Predecessor: Geoffrey Ridel
- Successor: Eustace

Orders
- Consecration: 31 December 1189

Personal details
- Died: January 1197 Poitiers
- Buried: abbey of Le Pin
- Denomination: Pre-Reformation Catholic

Chief Justiciar of England
- In office December 1189 – 1191
- Monarch: Richard I
- Preceded by: Hugh de Puiset (co-chief Justiciar until June 1190)
- Succeeded by: Walter de Coutances
- Constituency: South of the Humber River (March–June 1190)

Chancellor of England
- In office 1189–1197
- Monarch: Richard I
- Preceded by: Geoffrey
- Succeeded by: Eustace

chancellor of the Duchy of Aquitaine
- Monarchs: Richard, Duke of Aquitaine

William de Longchamp (Note: Sometimes known as William Longchamp or William de Longchamps. Appears in Latin on his seal as Willelmus de Longocampo.) (died 1197) was a medieval Lord Chancellor, Chief Justiciar, and Bishop of Ely in England. Born to a humble family in Normandy, he owed his advancement to royal favour. Although contemporary writers accused Longchamp's father of being a peasant's son, he held land as a knight. Longchamp first served Henry II's illegitimate son Geoffrey, but quickly transferred to the service of Richard I, Henry's heir. When Richard became king in 1189, Longchamp paid £3,000 for the office of Chancellor and was soon named to the Diocese, or bishopric, of Ely and appointed legate by the pope.

Longchamp governed England while Richard was on the Third Crusade, but his authority was challenged by Richard's brother, John, who eventually succeeded in driving Longchamp from power and from England. Longchamp's relations with the other leading English nobles were also strained, which contributed to the demands for his exile. Soon after Longchamp departed from England, Richard was captured on his journey back to England from the Crusade and held for ransom by Henry VI, Holy Roman Emperor. Longchamp travelled to Germany to help negotiate Richard's release. Although Longchamp regained the office of Chancellor after Richard's return to England, he lost much of his former power. He aroused a great deal of hostility among his contemporaries during his career, but he retained Richard's trust and was employed by the king until the bishop's death in 1197. Longchamp wrote a treatise on the law that remained well known throughout the Late Middle Ages.

== Background and early life ==
Longchamp's ancestors originated in the village of Longchamps, Eure, Normandy. Although it is known that he was born in Normandy, the exact location is unknown, with it perhaps being near the Norman village of Argenton. His father, Hugh de Longchamp, also held land in England, as did many other Norman nobles after the Norman Conquest in 1066. Hugh Nonant — one of Longchamp's opponents — declared that the elder Longchamp was the son of a peasant, which seems unlikely, as Hugh de Longchamp appears to have held a knight's tenancy in Normandy. The family was originally of humble background but rose through service to King Henry II. The elder Longchamp also held land in Herefordshire in England, including the manor of Wilton near Ross in Wales. Hugh married a woman named Eve, a relative of the Lacy family. Historian David Balfour suggests that Eve was the daughter of Gilbert de Lacy, the son of Roger de Lacy, exiled by King William II in 1095 for rebellion.

Longchamp's sister, Richeut, married the castellan of Dover Castle. A second sister, Melisend, came to England with Longchamp, but otherwise is unknown. A sister is recorded as having married Stephen Devereux, but whether this is Melisend is unclear. Of Longchamp's brothers, Osbert remained a layman and owed much of his advancement to William; Stephen served King Richard I on crusade; Henry, another layman, became a sheriff along with Osbert; and Robert became a monk. Two of Longchamp's brothers became abbots.

Longchamp entered public life at the close of Henry II's reign, as an official for the King's illegitimate son Geoffrey. (Note: There is a William of Longchamps who was a canon of Evreux in the 1180s, who may be the same person as the future Bishop of Ely. The William, who was a canon, occurs once in an Evreux charter that dates to sometime between 1181 and 1192 and again in an undated charter from the same period.) He soon left Geoffrey's service, and served in Henry II's chancery, or writing office, before he entered service with Henry's son Richard. Richard, who was Duke of Aquitaine at the time, named Longchamp chancellor of the Duchy of Aquitaine. Longchamp first distinguished himself at the court of King Philip II of France in Paris in 1189, when he acted as Richard's envoy in a dispute with William Marshal, King Henry's envoy. By that time, Longchamp was already one of Richard's trusted advisors.

== Chancellor and Justiciar ==
Seal of William de Longchamp. Latin text translates as "William of Longchamp, [Court] of the Lord King, Chancellor of England."

On Richard's accession to the throne of England in 1189, Longchamp became Chancellor of England. Longchamp paid 3,000 pounds (£) for the office of Chancellor. This was followed by an increase in the price of having chancery documents sealed with the Great Seal, necessary for their authentication, perhaps to help Longchamp recoup the cost of the office. At the council held at Pipewell on 15 September 1189, the King raised Longchamp to the bishopric of Ely. Richard named three other bishops at the same time: Godfrey de Lucy to Winchester, Richard FitzNeal to London, and Hubert Walter to Salisbury. Longchamp was consecrated on 31 December 1189 and enthroned at Ely on 6 January 1190.

Before leaving England in 1189, Richard put the Tower of London in Longchamp's hands and appointed him jointly with Hugh de Puiset, the Bishop of Durham, to the office of Chief Justiciar, at that time not strictly a judicial office. Instead, the justiciar was the person entrusted with much of the king's authority when the king was outside the kingdom, able to act in the king's name. Along with Puiset, the king named Hugh Bardulf, William Briwerre, Geoffrey fitz Peter, and William Marshal as associates in the justiciarship, under Puiset and Longchamp. As Justiciar, Longchamp sent judges throughout the country to visit the shires on judicial visits, even though he had no previous knowledge of the judiciary. Longchamp and Puiset were unable to work together, and so in March 1190 Richard gave authority north of the River Humber to Puiset, and authority south of the river to Longchamp. Historians' opinions are divided whether Richard explicitly made Longchamp superior to Puiset at this time, or if in theory the two were supposed to co-equal in their respective spheres. By June, Longchamp had eased Puiset out of power and the justiciar's office. He also received a commission as a papal legate from Pope Clement III at this time. Supposedly Richard paid 1,500 marks (£1,000) to the papacy to secure the legateship for Longchamp.

Longchamp granted the citizens of London the right to elect their own sheriffs, and to collect and remit their monetary levy of £300 directly to the Exchequer, the treasury of England. On Longchamp's visits to his diocese he was accompanied by a large train of retainers and animals, which became notorious throughout the country as a sign of his extravagance. Under his legatine authority, the bishop held legatine councils of the church at Gloucester and Westminster in 1190. He also acted to restore authority in York, which had suffered a breakdown in order after the massacre of Jews in March 1190. Also in 1190, he sent an army against Rhys ap Gruffydd, a Welsh prince who was attempting to throw off the control of the marcher lords that surrounded Wales.

== Disputes with John ==
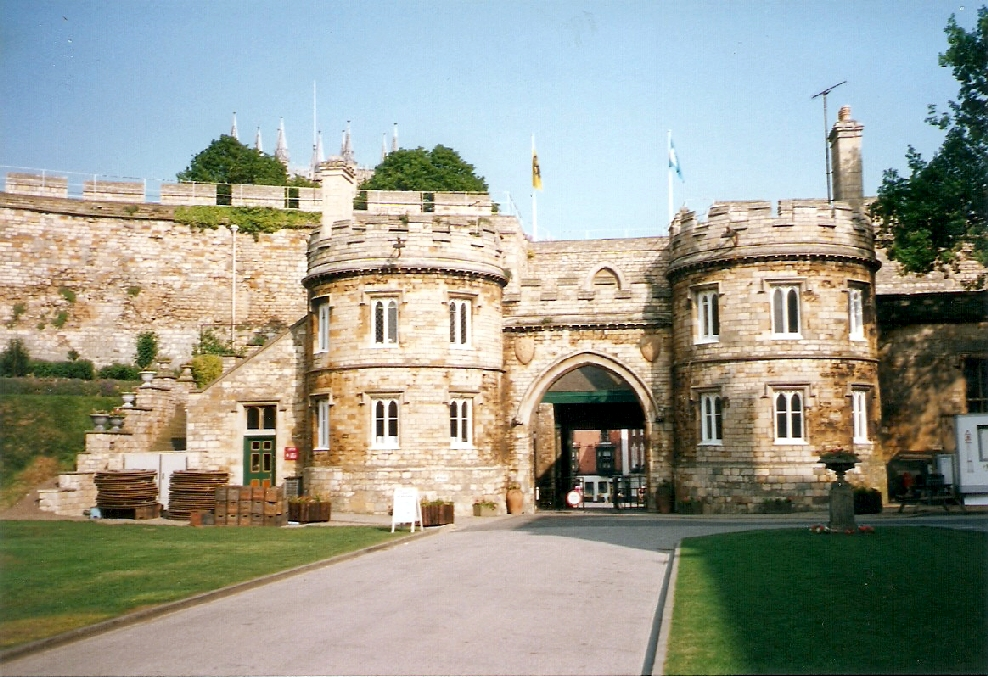
Gate at Lincoln Castle, which Longchamp besieged in 1190

Longchamp's relations with the English people were made more difficult because he was a native of Normandy and often insensitive to English customs. The medieval writer William of Newburgh claimed that Longchamp was "an obscure foreigner of unproven ability and loyalty". For example, it appears likely that Longchamp did not speak English, making his relations with his flock more difficult. The leading nobles complained that Longchamp marginalised the other officials Richard had appointed to serve with him and that he brought in foreigners to fill offices. Although the first charge is mostly untrue, the second appears to have been valid, as Longchamp did install non-natives in judicial offices and as sheriffs. He also attempted to seize control of several English castles by granting their custody to relatives and dependents.

Throughout 1190, Longchamp's relations with Richard's younger brother John were difficult. This led to Longchamp besieging Lincoln Castle because the castellan would not surrender the castle and allow himself to be replaced by Longchamp's nominee. The castellan, Gerard de Camville, had sworn allegiance to John and stated he would no longer recognise the chancellor's authority. In response, John took the two castles of Tickhill and Northampton. News of the dispute reached Richard, who sent Walter de Coutances, the Archbishop of Rouen, to England in late spring 1191, with orders to negotiate a peace between John and Longchamp. Eventually, Walter brokered a compromise between the two as a result of which Gerard was confirmed as castellan and John relinquished the castles. Longchamp also agreed to work to ensure John's succession to the throne in the event of Richard's death.

Longchamp's legatine commission from the papacy expired in spring 1191, on the death of Clement III, thus removing one of Longchamp's power bases. The legation was, however, renewed a few months later by Clement's successor, Celestine III. A further complication for Longchamp arose in September 1191, when Henry II's illegitimate son Geoffrey, Archbishop of York, was arrested by Longchamp's subordinates, led by the castellan of Dover Castle, Longchamp's brother-in-law. Their orders had been to arrest the Archbishop of York as he landed at Dover on the archbishop's return to England, but Geoffrey had been warned of their plans, and fled to sanctuary in St. Martin's Priory. Longchamp's men laid siege to the priory and, after four days, forcibly removed Geoffrey. The violence of the attack reminded the public of Thomas Becket's martyrdom, and public opinion turned against Longchamp. Longchamp claimed that Geoffrey had not sworn fealty to Richard, but this was likely just an excuse to eliminate a rival.

An intense propaganda campaign led by partisans of John ensued. One of the leaders of the campaign against Longchamp was Hugh Nonant, the Bishop of Coventry, and he along with other magnates, including Geoffrey, who had been released, convened a trial on 5 October 1191 at Loddon Bridge near London. Longchamp did not attend, but he was deposed and excommunicated, and after trying to hold the Tower of London, he was forced to surrender due to lack of support from the citizens of London. The council then declared his offices forfeit and ordered the surrender of the castles in his custody. The main charge against Longchamp appears to have been his autocratic behaviour.

Longchamp went to Dover in late 1191 to seek transport to the continent. During his escape, he was unable to answer the local people when they spoke to him in English. He attempted to leave England in various disguises, including a monk's habit and women's clothes. Hugh Nonant wrote that Longchamp attempted on one occasion to hide dressed as a prostitute, which led to him being assaulted by a fisherman who mistook him for a whore. Longchamp eventually succeeded in leaving England on 29 October 1191.

== Exile and return ==
Longchamp went to the court of Henry VI, the Holy Roman Emperor, who was holding King Richard captive at Trifels. The bishop arranged for Richard to be held at the imperial court and negotiated a ransom payment plan of 100,000 marks, under which the emperor agreed to release Richard once 70,000 marks had been paid, and hostages for the remaining 30,000 marks had been received. When the Emperor in January 1194 called a meeting of the imperial magnates to debate King Philip II of France's offer to pay the Emperor to keep Richard captive, Longchamp attended along with Walter of Coutances and Eleanor of Aquitaine, Richard's mother. After further diplomatic wrangling, Richard was freed on 4 February 1194.

Richard rewarded Longchamp with the custody of Eye, Suffolk and an appointment as Sheriff of Essex and Sheriff of Hertfordshire when the pair returned to England, but Longchamp soon became embroiled in a renewal of his disagreement with Archbishop Geoffrey of York. Richard left England in May 1194, and Longchamp accompanied him to the continent, never to return to England; Longchamp returned to the Emperor's court in 1195. Richard continued to use Longchamp in diplomacy — although it was Geoffrey who arranged a truce with King Philip in 1194 — as well as retaining the bishop as chancellor, but the main power in England was now Hubert Walter. Longchamp spent the rest of his life outside his diocese, usually accompanying the king.

== Death and legacy ==
Longchamp died in January 1197, at Poitiers, while on a diplomatic mission to Rome for Richard, and was buried at the abbey of Le Pin. Much of the information on his career comes from people hostile to him, for example, Gerald of Wales called Longchamp that "monster with many heads". The historian Austin Lane Poole says that Gerald described Longchamp as more like an ape than a man. Longchamp was reportedly a cultured and well-educated man. He was supported by others among his contemporaries, including Pope Clement III, who, when he appointed Longchamp legate, wrote that he did so at the urging of the English bishops. When he was one of four men named bishop in 1189, medieval chronicler Richard of Devizes wrote that the four new bishops were "men of no little virtue and fame". Historian John Gillingham wrote that Longchamp's "record of his life in politics and administration was a good one, spoiled only by his failure in 1191".

Two writers have seen, in the assembly that met to try Longchamp in 1191, a precursor to the gathering at Runnymede in 1215 that drew up Magna Carta, as it was one of the earliest examples of the nobles of the realm coming together to force the government to rule with their advice. Longchamp also promoted the careers of his brothers; Henry and Osbert became sheriffs in the 1190s, Osbert the Sheriff of Yorkshire. His brother Robert, a cleric, also benefitted, becoming prior of the Ely cathedral chapter and later abbot of St Mary's Abbey, York.

The medieval poet Nigel Wireker (also known as Nigel de Longchamps) dedicated to the bishop a satirical poem, Speculum Stultorum ("Mirror of Fools"), on the habits of students. Richard Barre, a medieval writer and judge, dedicated his work Compendium de veteris et novo testamento to Longchamp. Longchamp was one of Barre's patrons, and secured the post of Archdeacon of Ely for him as well as judicial posts.

One of Longchamp's probable innovations as chancellor was the replacement of the first person singular previously used in documents drafted in the king's name with the majestic plural or "royal we". He wrote a work on law entitled Practica legum et decretorum, a manual on the usage of both civil and canon law in the Angevin possessions on the continent, composed sometime between 1181 and 1189. It was well known in the Middle Ages and served as a practical guide for litigants.

== Citations ==
Political offices
Preceded by Geoffrey	Lord Chancellor; 1189–1197	Succeeded by Eustace (Keeper of the Great Seal)
Preceded by William de Mandeville, 3rd Earl of Essex; Hugh de Puiset	Chief Justiciar; 1189–1191; Served alongside: Hugh de Puiset until 1190	Succeeded by Walter de Coutances
Catholic Church titles
Preceded by Geoffrey Ridel	Bishop of Ely; 1189–1197	Succeeded by Eustace
