= Osbert de Longchamp =

Anglo-Norman administrator

Osbert de Longchamp or Osbert de Longo Campo (c. 1155 – before 1208) was an Anglo-Norman administrator.

He was born in Wilton Castle, near Ross-on-Wye, Herefordshire, the son of Hugh de Longchamp. One of his brothers, William, was to become Chancellor of England and Bishop of Ely and another brother, Henry, Sheriff of Herefordshire and Worcestershire.

Osbert was appointed High Sheriff of Yorkshire for 1190 by his powerful brother William in place of the troublesome John Marshall and Sheriff of Westmorland at the same time. In 1193 he was appointed Sheriff of Norfolk until 1195. William de Longchamp later lost power and Osbert and Henry their shrievalties.

He died before 1208. He had married Aveline, daughter of William de Allington.
