= Ralph Foliot =

12th-century English clergyman and royal justice

- Archdeacon of Hereford
- Installed: 1179
- Term ended: c. 1198
- Predecessor: Peter
- Successor: William fitzWalter

Personal details
- Born: Ralph Foliot
- Died: c. 1198
- Occupation: Clergyman, royal justice

Ralph Foliot (died c. 1198) was a medieval English clergyman and royal justice.

== Early career ==
Foliot was a nephew of Gilbert Foliot, first Bishop of Hereford and later Bishop of London, but the names of Ralph's parents and his place of birth are unknown. He first appears in a charter of his uncle in 1144, while Gilbert was at Hereford, and Ralph is described as "nepote episcopi" or the "bishop's nephew." Probably Ralph was encouraged in an ecclesiastical career by his uncle. Ralph probably studied in the schools at Hereford, which were some of the most well-known schools of higher learning of the time. After his uncle left Hereford for London in 1163, it appears that Ralph remained at Hereford as a member of the new bishop's household until at least 1180.

== Canon at Hereford ==
Foliot was a canon of Hereford Cathedral by 2 December 1178, possibly as soon as 25 April 1178. He first occurs as Archdeacon of Hereford in a document dated 15 March in a year between 1179 and 1181. His last occurrence as archdeacon was on 28 October 1195 and he was deceased by 1199. He may have died as early as 1197, but more probably died in 1198 or 1199. He was commemorated at Hereford on 20 December. Foliot may also have been a canon of Salisbury Cathedral, as a Ralph Foliot occurs as a canon there in spring of 1193, but it is not clear this is the same Ralph.

A c. 1210×1211 letter preserved in Speculum Duorum was addressed by Gerald of Wales to Foliot and two other members of the Hereford chapter. In it, Gerald complained that they should have known better than to support his nephew in his dispute over the archdeaconry of Beacon.

== Royal service ==
Foliot also was a member of the royal chancery, and attested charters of King Henry II of England in 1181 and 1182 as the king's sigillarius. He also served Henry on diplomatic missions, once meeting with papal legates, and another time accompanying William Marshall to Paris. Henry rewarded Foliot by petitioning the monastery of Northampton to appoint Foliot as parson of the church at Potton, Bedfordshire, which the monastery controlled. Other rewards included a portion of the tithes from Teilleul and a church in Worcestershire that was controlled by Tewkesbury Abbey.

By the reign of King Richard I, Henry's son, Foliot was a royal justice and from 1194 appears regularly as a royal justice, along with Richard Barre, William of Sainte-Mère-Eglise, Richard Herriard, and William de Warenne. He had previously served as a justice of eyre in 1190 and 1192.

== Legacy ==
Foliot had a brother William, who was precentor of the Hereford cathedral chapter. Foliot left 20 books to Hereford Cathedral on his death, including glosses on the Bible, Honorius of Autun's Gemma Animae, and Peter Lombard's Sentences. Foliot also was friends with the writer and ecclesiastic Gerald of Wales, who wrote a letter of condolence to William Foliot after Ralph's death.
