= Summa Parisiensis =

The Summa Parisiensis is an anonymous commentary on the Decretum Gratiani from about 1170.

The Decretum Gratiani or Concordia discordantium canonum is a collection of Catholic Church Canon law compiled and written in the 12th century as a legal textbook by the jurist known as Gratian.
