= Ranulf de Glanvill =

Chief Justiciar of England (c. 1112–1190)

Chief Justiciar of England
- In office 1180 – 17 September 1189
- Monarch: Henry II
- Preceded by: Richard de Luci
- Succeeded by: William de Mandeville; Hugh de Puiset

Sheriff of Lancashire
- In office 1173–?
- Monarch: Henry II

Sheriff of Yorkshire
- In office 1163–1170

Sheriff of Yorkshire
- In office 1175–?

Justice of the King's Court
- In office 1176–1180

Personal details
- Born: c. 1112 Stratford St Andrew, Suffolk
- Died: 1190 Acre, Palestine
- Relations: Hubert Walter, nephew

Ranulf de Glanvill (alias Glanvil, Glanville, Granville, etc., died 1190) was Chief Justiciar of England during the reign of King Henry II (1154–89) and was the probable author of Tractatus de legibus et consuetudinibus regni Anglie (The Treatise on the Laws and Customs of the Kingdom of England), the earliest treatise on the laws of England.

== Political and legal career ==
There are no primary sources citing when or where he was born. He is first heard of as Sheriff of Yorkshire, Warwickshire and Leicestershire from 1163 to 1170 when, along with the majority of High Sheriffs, he was removed from office for corruption.

However, in 1173, he was appointed Sheriff of Lancashire and custodian of the honour of Richmond. In 1174, when he was Sheriff of Westmorland, he was one of the English leaders at the Battle of Alnwick, and it was to him that the king of Scotland, William the Lion, surrendered.

In 1175, he was reappointed Sheriff of Yorkshire, in 1176 he became justice of the king's court and a justice itinerant in the northern circuit, and in 1180 Chief Justiciar of England. It was with his assistance that Henry II completed his famous judicial reforms, though many had been carried out before he came into office. He became the king's right-hand man, and during Henry's frequent absences was in effect regent of England. In 1176, he was also made custodian of Queen Eleanor, who was confined to her quarters in Winchester Castle.

After the death of Henry in 1189, Glanvill was removed from his office by Richard I on 17 September 1189 and imprisoned until he had paid a ransom, according to one authority, of £15,000. Shortly after obtaining his freedom he took the cross, and he died at the siege of Acre in 1190.

He founded two monasteries, both in Suffolk: Butley Priory, for Black Canons, was founded in 1171, and Leiston Abbey, for White Canons, in 1183. He also built a leper hospital at Somerton, in Norfolk.

== Marriage and progeny ==
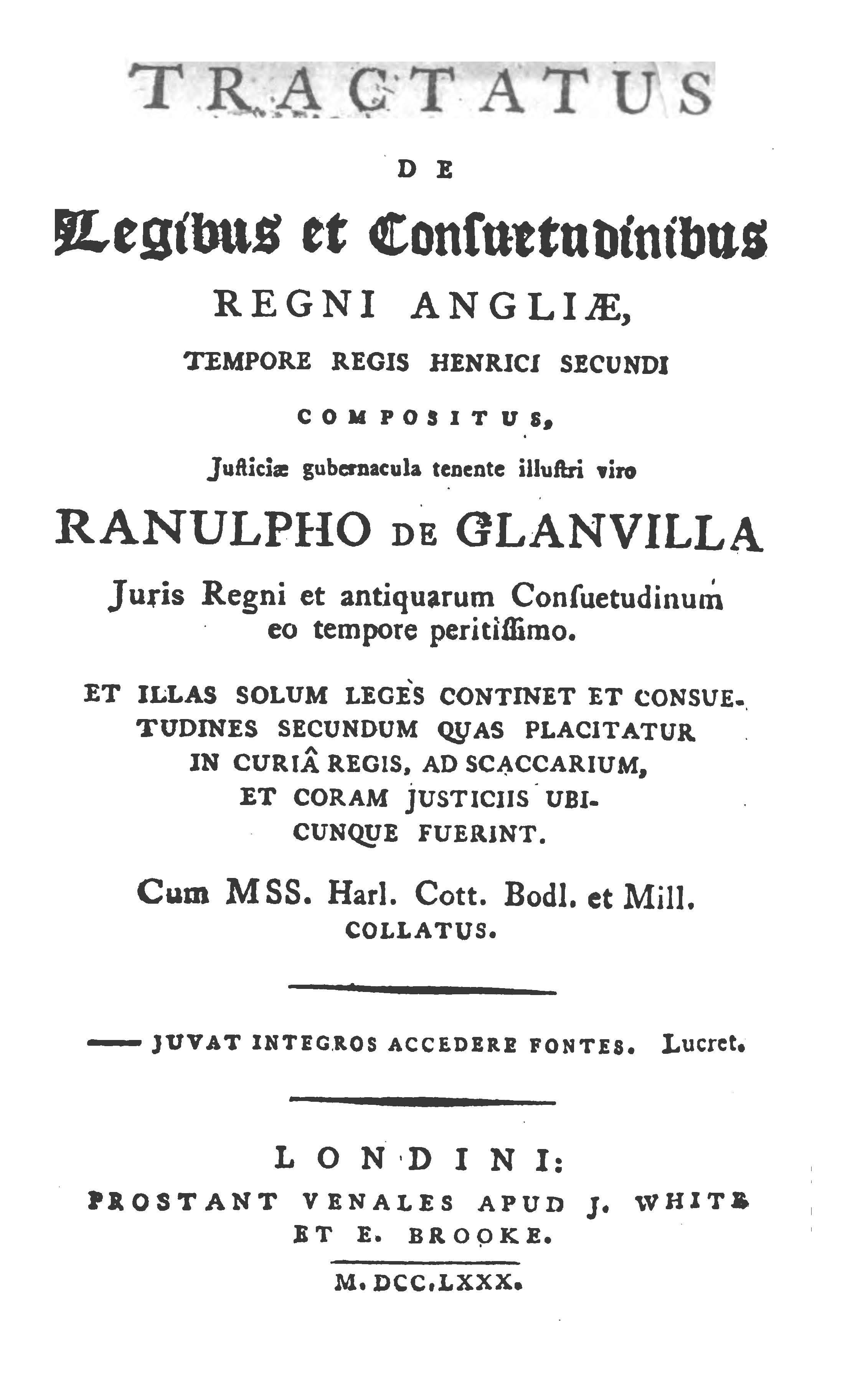
The title page of a 1780 edition of Glanvill's Tractatus de legibus et consuetudinibus regni Angliæ

Ranulf married Bertha de Valoignes, daughter of Theobald de Valoines, lord of the manor of Parham, Suffolk, by whom he had three daughters:

- Matilda (Maud) de Glanville, who married Sir William de Auberville of Westenhanger, Kent: they were the founders of Langdon Abbey in Kent.
- Ammabil (Mabel) de Glanville, who married a certain de Arden.
- Helewis de Glanville, who married Robert fitz Ralph fitz Ribald: she was the foundress of Swainby Abbey, which was afterwards moved to Coverham Abbey, North Yorkshire.

== Tractatus de legibus ==
Perhaps at the instigation of Henry II, Glanvill wrote or oversaw the writing of Tractatus de legibus et consuetudinibus regni Anglie (The Treatise on the Laws and Customs of the Kingdom of England), a practical discourse on the forms of procedure in the king's court, which was often known simply as Glanvill. As the source of our knowledge regarding the earliest form of the curia regis, and for the information it affords regarding ancient customs and laws, it is of great value to the student of English history. It is now generally agreed that the work of Glanvill is of earlier date than the Scottish law book known from its first words as Regiam Majestatem, which bears a close resemblance to his.

The treatise of Glanvill was first printed in 1554. An English translation, with notes and introduction by John Beames, was published at London in 1812. A French version is found in various manuscripts, but has not yet been printed. The treatise was then edited and translated by G.D.G. Hall for the Oxford University Press in 1965.

The authorship of the Tractatus, while certainly within the sphere of Ranulf, is debated, other candidates for its authorship or co-authorship including Ranulf's nephews Hubert Walter (Chief Justiciar and Lord Chancellor of England under Richard I) and Osbert fitzHervey.

== Notes ==
Political offices
Preceded by Richard de Luci	Chief Justiciar; 1180–1189	Succeeded by William de Mandeville; Hugh de Puiset
