= Trinity Chapel =

East end of Canterbury Cathedral

Coordinates: 51°16′47″N 1°05′01″E

Trinity Chapel at the east end of Canterbury Cathedral forms part of a UNESCO World Heritage Site. It was built under the supervision of the master-masons William of Sens and William the Englishman as a shrine for the relics of the martyred Archbishop of Canterbury Thomas Becket. The shrine became one of the most popular pilgrimage sites in England.

== Origin ==
The chapel was constructed between 1179 and 1184, replacing a much smaller chapel of the same name destroyed by fire, along with much of the rest of the choir, in 1174. Its predecessor was where Becket celebrated his first mass following his installation as Archbishop of Canterbury.

== Thomas Becket ==
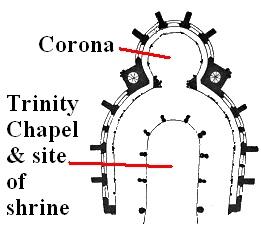
Plan of Trinity Chapel

In 1220, Becket's remains were translated from his first tomb to the finished chapel. As a result of this event, the chapel became a major pilgrimage site, inspiring Geoffrey Chaucer to write The Canterbury Tales in 1387 and with routes (e.g. from Southwark (Chaucer's route) and the Pilgrim's Way to/from Winchester) converging on the cathedral. Becket's shrine stood until it was destroyed in 1540. This was done on orders from King Henry VIII as vengeance for his ancestor, Henry II. The king also destroyed Becket's bones and ordered that all mention of his name be obliterated. The pavement where the shrine stood in the chapel is today marked by a lighted candle. Modern day archbishops of Canterbury celebrate the Eucharist at this place to commemorate Becket's martyrdom and the translation of his body from his first burial place to this chapel.

== The Black Prince ==
Over time other significant burials took place in this area such as Edward Plantagenet (the Black Prince), who was interred on the south side of Becket's shrine. His tomb consists of a superb gilded copper effigy beneath a tester depicting the Holy Trinity, with his heraldic achievements hung over the tester. The achievements have now been replaced by replicas, though the originals can still be seen nearby, and the tester was restored in 2006.

== King Henry IV ==
Also buried in the chapel are King Henry IV and his second wife, Joan of Navarre, Queen of England. Henry's tomb is on the north side of Trinity Chapel, next to the shrine of St Thomas Becket. It was unusual for a King of England not to be buried at Westminster Abbey, but Becket's cult was then at its height, as evidenced in the Canterbury Tales, and Henry seemed particularly devoted to it, or at least keen to be associated with it. Reasons for his interment in Canterbury are debatable, but it is highly likely that Henry deliberately associated himself with the martyred saint for reasons of political expediency, namely, the legitimation of his dynasty after seizing the throne from his cousin, Richard II. Significantly, at his coronation, he was anointed with holy oil which was said to have been given to Becket by the Virgin Mary shortly before his death in 1170; this oil was placed inside a distinct eagle-shaped container of gold. According to one version of the legend, the oil had then passed to Henry's maternal grandfather, Henry of Grosmont, 1st Duke of Lancaster. Evidence of Henry's deliberate connexion to St Thomas lies in the structure of the tomb itself. The wooden panel at the western end of his tomb bears a painting of the martyrdom of Becket, and the tester, or wooden canopy, above the tomb is painted with Henry's personal motto, 'Soverayne', alternated by crowned golden eagles. Likewise, the three large coats of arms that dominate the tester painting are surrounded by collars of SS, a golden eagle enclosed in each tiret. The presence of such eagle motifs most likely points directly to Henry's coronation oil and his ideological association with St Thomas. Sometime after the King's death, an imposing tomb was built for him and his queen, probably commissioned and paid for by Queen Joan herself. On top of the tomb chest lie detailed alabaster effigies of the King and Queen, crowned and dressed in their ceremonial robes. Henry's body was evidently well-embalmed, as an exhumation in 1832 established, allowing historians to state with reasonable certainty that the effigies are accurate portrait.

== The Corona Tower ==
The Corona Tower (sometimes known as "Beckets's Crown"), a circular structure at the east end of the Trinity chapel, is widely thought to have received its name from having been built to contain the relic of the crown of St Thomas's head which was struck off during his murder. However, Robert Willis in his Architectural History of Canterbury Cathedral (1845) rejected this idea, saying that 'corona' was a word applied to the eastern apses of many churches in the medieval period. In his account of a visit to the cathedral, before the destruction of the shrine, Erasmus said that the saint's head was displayed in the crypt.

Records of valuable gifts made there by pilgrims in the 13th century do, however, indicate that there were some relics of St Thomas Becket in the Corona. The shrines of St Odo and St Wilfred were also eventually placed there.

== Bibliography ==
- Willis, Robert (1845). The Architectural History of Canterbury Cathedral. London: Longman.
- Withers, Hartley (1897). The Cathedral Church of Canterbury. Bell's Cathedral Series (2nd revised ed.). London: George Bell. pp. 88–9.
