= Eustace (bishop of Ely) =

12th and 13th-century Bishop of Ely and Chancellor of England

- Bishop of Ely
- Elected: 10 August 1197
- Predecessor: William Longchamp
- Successor: Geoffrey de Burgo
- Other post: Dean of Salisbury

Orders
- Consecration: 8 March 1198 by Hubert Walter

Personal details
- Died: 3 or 4 February 1215 Reading
- Buried: Ely Cathedral
- Denomination: Catholic

Keeper of the Great Seal
- In office 1197–1198
- Monarch: Richard I
- Preceded by: William Longchamp
- Succeeded by: Hubert Walter

Lord Chancellor
- In office 1198–1199
- Monarch: Richard I
- Preceded by: William Longchamp
- Succeeded by: Hubert Walter

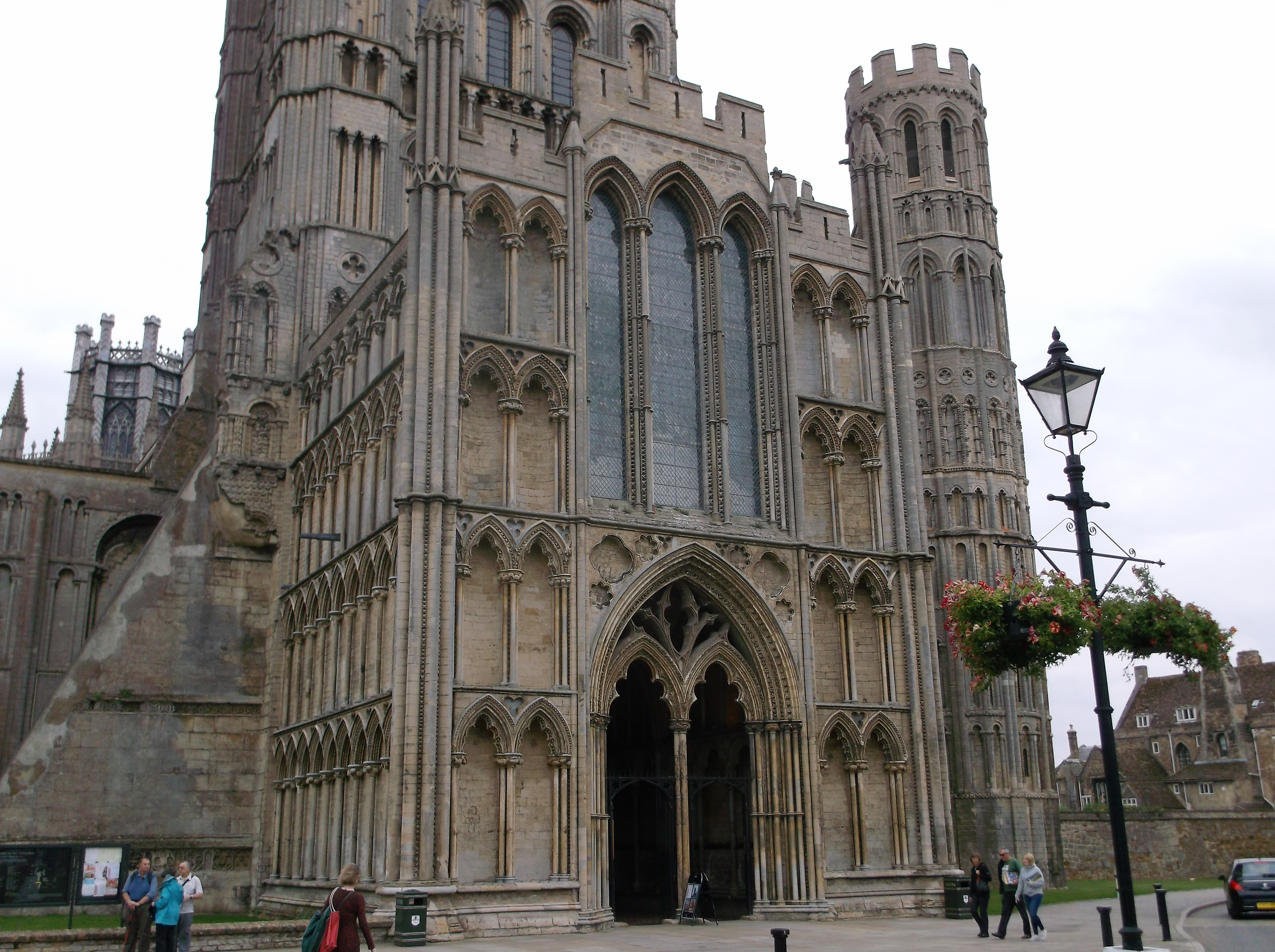
Ely Cathedral

Eustace (died February 1215) was the twenty-third Lord Chancellor of England, from 1197 to 1198. He was also Dean of Salisbury and Bishop of Ely.

== Early life ==
Eustace was probably French or Norman by birth and was educated at Paris. He was a student with Gerald of Wales, who remained a lifelong friend. After his education was finished, he was considered a master, or magister. By 1177, he was a clerk for Robert Foliot, who was Bishop of Hereford, and he stayed at Hereford until around 1186. By 1190, he held the office of parson of Withcall, Lincolnshire. He entered the king's service sometime before 1194, for he was Dean of Salisbury by 5 May 1194. He held the offices of Archdeacon of Richmond, treasurer of the East Riding and archdeacon of the East Riding after this.

== Bishop ==
Eustace was elected to the see of Ely on 10 August 1197 and consecrated on 8 March 1198. He had been elected at Vaudreuil, but King Richard I of England sent him on a diplomatic mission to Germany after his election, which kept him from being consecrated until 1198. The consecration was performed by Hubert Walter, the Archbishop of Canterbury at Westminster.

Eustace was Lord Chancellor from May 1198 to May 1199. During this time he also acted as a royal justice, and in January 1199, Richard sent him to King Philip II of France to notify the French king that the truce between Philip and Richard was over. With the death of King Richard and the accession of King John of England, Eustace was replaced as chancellor by Hubert Walter, but Eustace was still employed by the king on diplomatic errands, including two errands to the French king, in 1202 and 1204. It was at this time that Pope Innocent III began to use Eustace as a papal judge-delegate, first appointing him to help mediate a dispute between Hubert Walter and the monks of Canterbury.

Eustace was appointed one of the papal commissioners to investigate and settle the attempt by Savaric FitzGeldewin the Bishop of Wells to take over Glastonbury Abbey as Savaric's new cathedral site. The commissioners set forth a plan, but Savaric died soon after and Pope Innocent III was persuaded to disallow the move. During King John's dispute with the pope over the election of Stephen Langton as Archbishop of Canterbury, the pope once more chose Eustace as a commissioner in August 1207, along with William of Sainte-Mère-Eglise, the Bishop of London, and Mauger the Bishop of Worcester. The commission tried to convince the king to accept Langton, but eventually in March 1208, they pronounced an interdict on England because of John's refusal to accept Langton. In July 1208 the commissioners once more attempted to negotiate with John, this time in company with Langton's brother Simon Langton. They waited eight weeks for a meeting, but the king never received them. A year later, the king finally met with them at Dover. Although an agreement was reached, it was never put into effect, and negotiations reached a stalemate. In November, the commissioners declared John excommunicated. Eustace had been in exile since the proclamation of the interdict in 1208. In 1212, Eustace journeyed to Rome to complain to Innocent about John's oppression of the English Church.

== Later life and death ==
When John made his peace with Innocent, Eustace was allowed to return to England, and it was Eustace who formally lifted the excommunication of John on 2 July 1214. John had pledged to compensate Eustace for the damages done to Ely during the interdict, which were estimated to have been around £1000. When John came into conflict with the barons, the king attempted to win over Eustace by giving Ely the royal rights of patronage to Thorney Abbey.

Eustace died at Reading on 3 February 1215 or on 4 February. He was buried in Ely Cathedral near the altar of St. Mary. A modern historian, C. R. Cheney, said of Eustace that even though he started as a royal official, he "rose to [his] responsibilities" as bishop. It was a letter of Eustace to Innocent that caused Innocent to write a letter back entitled Pastoralis officii diligentia, which later was incorporated into Gratian's Decretals. Eustace was also active in promoting the canonization of Gilbert of Sempringham. He also investigated alleged miracles of Wulfstan of Worcester. He also built the church of St. Mary, in Ely.

== Citations ==
Political offices
Preceded by William Longchamp (Lord Chancellor)	Keeper of the Great Seal; 1197–1198	Succeeded by Hubert Walter (Lord Chancellor)
Preceded by William Longchamp (Lord Chancellor)	Lord Chancellor; 1198	Succeeded by Hubert Walter (Lord Chancellor)
Catholic Church titles
Preceded by William Longchamp	Bishop of Ely; 1197–1215	Succeeded by Geoffrey de Burgo
