= Royal justice =

Judges in medieval England

Royal justices were judges in medieval England with the power to hear pleas of the Crown. They were roving officials of the king of England, sent to seek out notorious robbers and murderers and bring them to justice.

== Norman period ==
In medieval England, the king dispensed justice. He judged cases himself with the advice of his curia regis (Latin for "king's court"). But he could also delegate this power to others. Before the Norman Conquest of 1066, each shire had its own shire court presided over by the sheriff, who was the king's representative. The laws of Cnut (r. 1016–1035) reserved the most serious crimes, such as murder and treason, to the king's jurisdiction as pleas of the Crown.

William the Conqueror (r. 1066–1087) and William Rufus (r. 1087–1100) occasionally commissioned trusted barons to hear cases at the shire courts, which were called county courts after the Conquest. Under Rufus, these judicial commissions were supplemented by itinerant justices. Henry I (r. 1100–1135) organised the royal justices into judicial circuits, and his chief justiciar would send justices on periodic general eyres to investigate crown pleas and levy fines for dereliction of duty. They could also hear common pleas (anything not a crown plea) at the request of the parties. This is the origin of the modern system where High Court judges go "on circuit" to hear serious cases.

In cases involving crown pleas, the itinerant justices presided over the county court, while the sheriff's role was to preserve order and ensure the necessary people attended court. Nevertheless, the sheriff still presided over non-royal pleas. Royal justices were chosen from among barons and prelates of the royal household, and they played an important role in ensuring the king had accurate information regarding events in the counties.

== See also ==
- Assize of Clarendon
- Justice in Eyre
