= Richard Barre =

12th-century English clergyman and royal official

- Archdeacon of Ely
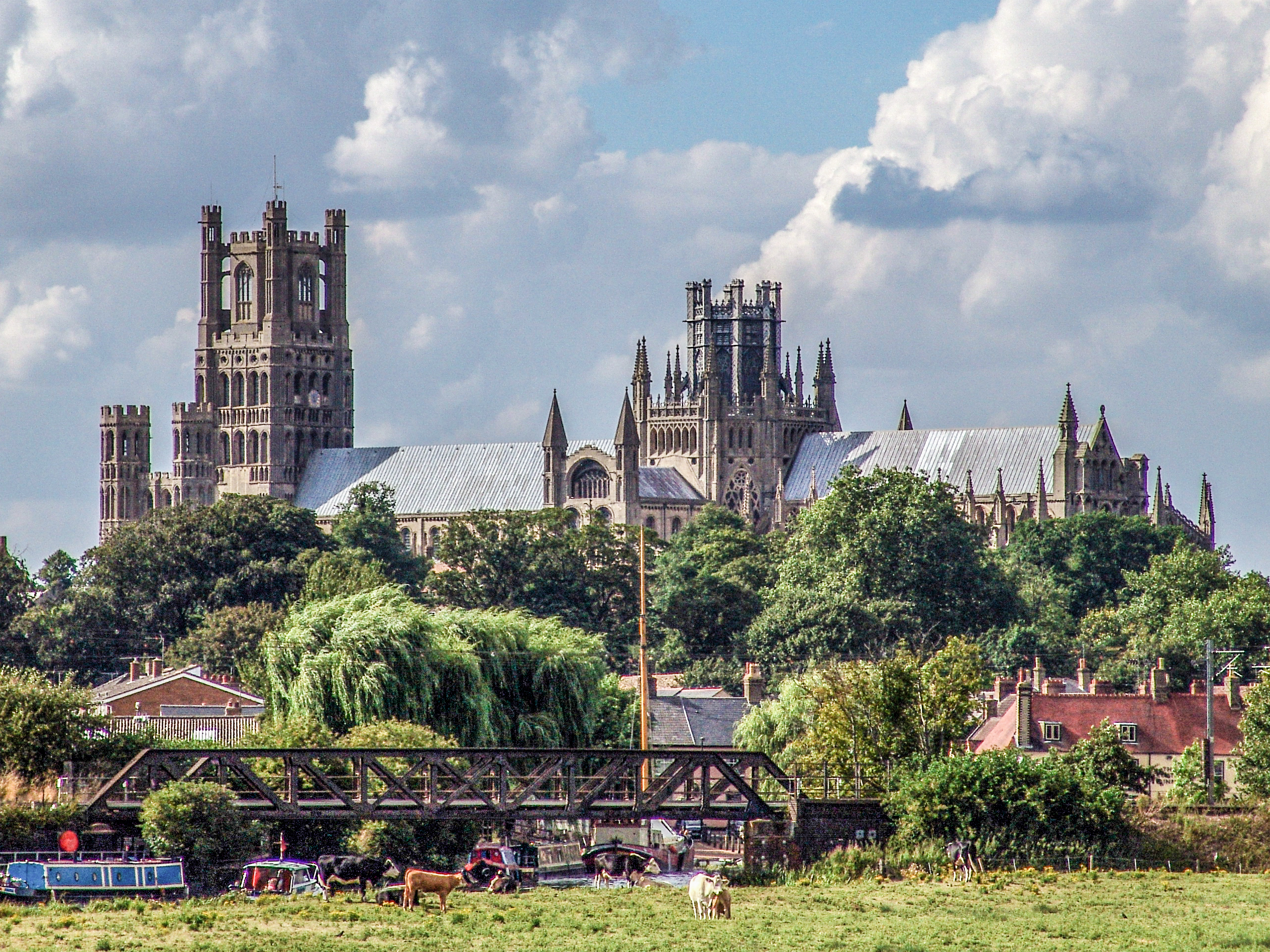
- Ely Cathedral
- Church: Catholic
- Other post: Archdeacon of Lisieux

Personal details
- Born: c. 1130
- Died: c. 1202
- Education: University of Bologna

Richard Barre (c. 1130 – c. 1202) was a medieval English justice, clergyman, and scholar. He was educated at the law school of Bologna and entered royal service under King Henry II of England, later working for Henry's son and successor Richard I. He was also briefly in the household of Henry's son Henry the Young King. Barre served the elder Henry as a diplomat and was involved in a minor way with the king's quarrel with Thomas Becket, which earned Barre a condemnation from Becket. After King Henry's death, Barre served as a royal justice during Richard's reign and was one of the main judges from 1194 to 1199. After disagreeing with him earlier in his career, Barre was discharged from his judgeship during John's reign as king. Barre was also archdeacon of Ely and the author of a work of biblical extracts dedicated to one of his patrons, William Longchamp, the Bishop of Ely and Chancellor of England.

== Early life ==
Whether Barre was a native of England or of Normandy is unknown, but his surname appears to derive from the Norman village of La Barre, near Bernay, in the present-day department of Eure. He was likely born around 1130 and was related to Normandy's Sifrewast family, (Note: The Sifrewast family was from Normandy, near the place called now Chiffrevast at Tamerville near Valognes.) knights in Berkshire. Barre had a relative, Hugh Barre, who was Archdeacon of Leicester in the 1150s. Barre studied law at Bologna in Italy before 1150 and was a student there with Stephen of Tournai, who became Bishop of Tournai in 1192. Another fellow student wrote a short verse addressed to Barre: "Pontificum causas regumque negocia tractes, Qui tibi divicias deliciasque parant", which translates to "May you manage the causes of bishops and the affairs of kings, Who provide riches and delights for you." After finishing his schooling, Barre seems to have worked for either Robert de Chesney, the Bishop of Lincoln, or Nicholas, Archdeacon of Huntingdon; the main evidence for this is that Barre witnessed charters for both men from 1160 to 1164. By 1165, Barre had joined the household of King Henry II of England.

== Service to King Henry ==
Barre served King Henry during the king's quarrel with Thomas Becket, the Archbishop of Canterbury, who had gone into exile in 1164 over the dispute about the limits of royal authority over the English Church. Because of Barre's close ties to King Henry, Becket considered him one of the king's "evil counselors", and Barre was the subject of denunciations by the archbishop. In late August 1169, Barre was in Normandy with Henry, where Barre was part of a group of ecclesiastics advising the king on how to resolve the Becket dispute. (Note: This group advising the king included two continental archbishops—from Rouen and Bordeaux, a number of bishops—including all the Norman bishops, other French bishops and an English bishop, and abbots from Norman, Breton, and English monasteries. The assemblage was rounded out by scholars such as Geoffrey of Auxerre and royal clerks such as Geoffrey Ridel and John of Oxford. However, although Gilbert Foliot, one of the main opponents of Becket was in the area, he was not able to consult with the king because he was excommunicate.) In September 1169, Barre was sent along with two other clerks to Rome to complain about the behaviour of papal envoys during negotiations with Becket held at the beginning of September. The papal negotiators initially agreed to a compromise, but the next day claimed the proposal was unacceptable. Following the failure of the negotiations, Becket restored the sentences of excommunication against a number of royal officials, but Barre was not among those specifically named, even though many of his colleagues were. The historian Frank Barlow argues that Barre was not specifically named in the restoration of excommunications, as Becket considered him already excommunicated because of his association with those under the church's ban.

During January and February 1170 the king sent Barre on a diplomatic mission to the pope in Rome, on a matter related to the king's dispute with Becket. The mission attempted to secure the rescinding of the excommunication of those whom Becket had placed under clerical ban, but it was unsuccessful; rumours circulated that the mission sought and secured papal permission for the coronation of King Henry's eldest living son by someone other than Becket. When Becket protested to Pope Alexander III over this usurpation of the right of the archbishop to crown English kings, Alexander not only stated that no such permission had been granted but threatened to suspend or depose any bishop who crowned Henry's heir. Barlow thinks it possible that Barre received a verbal agreement from the pope in January to allow the coronation, but there is no written evidence that Alexander agreed to allow the coronation in 1170. (Note: Alexander had earlier given permission for the coronation, likely in June 1161, but in 1166 Alexander revoked the permission at the instigation of Becket.)

After Becket's murder in December 1170, King Henry sent Barre to Rome, accompanied by the Archbishop of Rouen, the bishops of Évreux and Worcester, and other royal clerks, to plead the royal case with the papacy. The mission's objective was to make it clear to Alexander that Henry had had nothing to do with Becket's murder and that the king was horrified that it had taken place. Barre was at first refused a meeting with Alexander, but eventually the envoys were allowed to meet with the pope. Although the mission was not a complete success, the royal commission did manage to persuade the papacy not to impose an interdict, or ban on clerical rites, on England or to excommunicate the king. Shortly afterwards, Barre was granted the office of Archdeacon of Lisieux, probably as a reward for his efforts in Rome in 1171. In September, he was named a royal justice. He was named chancellor to King Henry's eldest living son Henry for a brief period in 1172 and 1173, but when the younger Henry rebelled against his father and sought refuge at the French royal court, Barre refused to join him in exile and returned to the king's service. Barre took with him the younger Henry's seal.

In addition to the Lisieux archdeaconry, Barre held the prebend of Hurstborne and Burbage in the Diocese of Salisbury from 1177 and the prebend of Moreton and Whaddon in the Diocese of Hereford from 1180 through 1184. He continued to hold the archdeaconry at Lisieux until 1188, and was at Lisieux for most of the late 1170s and 1180s. In 1179, he was at Rouen for the display of the body of Saint Romanus and was one of the witnesses to the event. While holding his Norman archdeaconry, he gave land to the abbey of St-Pierre-sur-Dives along with Ralph, Bishop of Lisieux. In February or March 1188, King Henry sent Barre on a diplomatic mission to the continent with letters to Frederick Barbarossa, the German Emperor; Béla III, the King of Hungary; and Isaac II Angelos, the Emperor at Constantinople, seeking assistance for his projected crusade. Barre carried letters to the three rulers requesting passage through their lands and the right to procure supplies. (Note: The contents of the letters, plus the replies from the other rulers, are preserved in Ralph of Diceto's works.) Nothing came of this mission, as Henry died in 1189 before the crusade could set off.

== Later years and death ==
After the death of King Henry, Barre joined the service of William Longchamp, the Bishop of Ely, who was justiciar and Lord Chancellor. Longchamp named Barre as Archdeacon of Ely, with the appointment occurring before 4 July 1190. Longchamp sent Barre as a royal justice to the counties near Ely in 1190. However, Longchamp was driven into exile in late 1191 owing to the hostility of the English nobility and Richard's brother Prince John during Richard's absence on the Third Crusade. Longchamp's exile meant that Barre did not serve as a royal justice again until King Richard I returned to England in 1194. Although Longchamp eventually returned to England, he did not return to his diocese, and much of the administration of Ely would have devolved on Barre during Longchamp's absence. (Note: The author Duncan Lunan, in an investigative article about the Green Children of Woolpit, argues that Barre married Agnes, one of the mysterious children, and had at least one child by her. No other reference mentions any marriage or children for Barre.)

Barre was one of the main royal justices between 1194 and 1199. He also served as a lawyer for the new Bishop of Ely, Eustace, who was elected in August 1197. But Barre had incurred the hostility of the king's younger brother, Prince John, and when John succeeded Richard as king in 1199, Barre ceased to be employed as a royal justice, instead returning to Ely and business in his clerical office. His last sure mention in the historical record is on 9 August 1202, when he was serving as a judge-delegate for Pope Innocent III, but he may have been alive as late as 1213, as he was part of a papal panel deciding a case that can only be securely dated to between 1198 and 1213. Barre maintained his friendship with Stephen of Tournai, who corresponded with him later in their lives.

== Literary work ==
Barre wrote a work on the Bible entitled Compendium de veteri et novo testamento, which he dedicated to Longchamp. The work arranged passages from the Bible under topics, and then annotated the passages with marginal notations such as were done with glosses on Roman law. It is still extant in two manuscript (MS) copies, MS British Library Harley 3255, and Lambeth Palace MS 105. The Harley manuscript is shorter than the Lambeth manuscript. Richard Sharpe, a modern historian who studied both works, stated that the Harley manuscript "provides [a] well structured and systematic (though not complete) coverage of the whole Bible." Because of the dedication to William Longchamp as "bishop, legate, and chancellor", it is likely that the work was composed between January 1190 and October 1191, as Longchamp only held those three offices together during that period. The prologue to the work describes it as something to be used privately, and thus Sharpe feels that it was not intended to be a publicly published work; instead, Barre may have intended it for Longchamp's private use in preparing sermons.

A third copy of Barre's Compendium may have existed at Leicester Abbey, where a late-15th-century library catalogue records a work by Barre on the Bible, titled "Compendium Ricardi Barre super utroque testamento". The title and contents make this manuscript likely to be a copy of the Compendium. The same catalogue also records five books once owned by Barre—copies of Gratian's Decretum, Justinian's Codex, glossed copies of the Psalter and some of the Epistles of Paul, as well as Peter Lombard's Sentences. Also, another Leicester Abbey manuscript records some satirical verses that were said to have been written by Barre.
