= Justiciar =

Medieval title for judge or minister

Justiciar is the English form of the medieval Latin term justiciarius or justitiarius (meaning "judge" or "justice"). The Chief Justiciar was the king's chief minister, roughly equivalent to a modern Prime Minister of the United Kingdom.

The Justiciar of Ireland was an office established during the Anglo-Norman invasion of Ireland and was a key tool in its colonisation. Following the conquest of the Principality of Wales in the 13th century, the areas that became personal fiefs of the English monarchs were placed under the control of the Justiciar of North Wales and the Justiciar of South Wales.

A similar office was formed in Scotland, although there were usually two or three – the Justiciar of Scotia, the Justiciar of Lothian and, in the 13th century, the Justiciar of Galloway. These offices later evolved into a national one called Lord Justice-General. The modern title is Lord President of the Court of Session.

Similar positions existed in continental Europe, particularly in Norman Italy and in Sweden.

== England ==
In Norman England, kings enlarged the scope of royal justice by delegating judicial authority to members of the curia regis (Latin for "king's court"). These were called justiciars. Henry I (r. 1100–1135) appointed local justiciars to supervise a county or group of counties. It was not until the reign of Henry II (1154–1189) that the title was exclusively applied to the king's chief minister.

After the Norman Conquest of 1066, the King of England was also Duke of Normandy and divided his time between the two territories. In his absence, William the Conqueror (r. 1066–1087) temporarily delegated viceroyal authority to trusted officers described variously as regent, custodian, and prefect. When William Rufus (r. 1087–1100) became king, this temporary role developed into a more permanent and defined office. Rufus entrusted the control of government administration to his chaplain, Bishop Ranulf Flambard of Durham. Flambard ran the government at all times, even when Rufus lived in England. Historian Frank Barlow argues that Flambard was the first chief justiciar. While Flambard was probably the first to exercise the powers of a chief justiciar, he never held that rank officially. Nevertheless, he was described by contemporary chronicler Orderic Vitalis as a justiciarius.

Sometime around 1107 or 1108, Henry I appointed his chancellor, Roger of Salisbury, as the first chief justiciar. Roger was described by chroniclers as secundus a rege (Latin for "second from the king"). Roger oversaw the administration of justice, ecclesiastical appointments, and royal finances. According to the chronicler Symeon of Durham, Roger made most decisions for the royal government. Historian Bryce Lyon writes that "Roger was a sort of medieval prime minister but a minister immeasurably more powerful because his only responsibility was to his lord the king."

The chief justiciar was responsible for directing the royal household, the curia regis, and the government departments. Nevertheless, he was not a member of the household. He was the presiding officer of the exchequer and directed the procedures of the curia regis as the chief royal justice. He also supervised the itinerant justices.

The chief justiciar was invariably a great noble or churchman, and the office became very powerful and important; enough to be a threat to the king. The last great justiciar, Hubert de Burgh, 1st Earl of Kent, was removed from office in 1232, and the chancellor soon took the position formerly occupied by the chief justiciar as second to the king in dignity, as well as in power and influence. Under King Edward I, the office of justiciar was replaced by separate heads for the three branches into which the King's Court was divided – justices of the Court of Common Pleas, justices of the Court of King's Bench, and barons of the Court of Exchequer.

=== List of chief justiciars of England ===
Name	Term	King(s)
Roger of Salisbury	1102–1116?	Henry I
Ralph Basset	1116	Henry I
Richard Basset (Justiciar)		Henry I
Roger of Salisbury	?–1139	Stephen
Robert de Beaumont, 2nd Earl of Leicester	1154–68 (jointly with Richard de Luci)	Henry II
Richard de Luci	1154–79	Henry II
Ranulf de Glanville	1180–89	Henry II
William de Mandeville, 3rd Earl of Essex	1189 (jointly with Hugh de Puiset)	Richard I
Hugh de Puiset, Bishop of Durham	December 1189 – April 1190	Richard I
William Longchamp, Bishop of Ely	1189–91	Richard I
Walter de Coutances, Archbishop of Rouen	1191–93	Richard I
Hubert Walter, Archbishop of Canterbury	1194–98	Richard I
Geoffrey Fitz Peter, 1st Earl of Essex	11 July 1198 – 14 October 1213	John
Peter des Roches, Bishop of Winchester	1213–1215	John
Hubert de Burgh, 1st Earl of Kent	1215–1232	John
Hubert de Burgh, 1st Earl of Kent	1215–1232	Henry III
Stephen de Segrave	?–1234	Henry III
Hugh Bigod	1258–60	Henry III
Hugh le Despencer	1260 – May 1261, July 1263 – 4 August 1265	Henry III
Philip Basset	May 1261 – July 1263	Henry III

== Scotland ==
In Scotland, justiciars were the king's lieutenants for judicial and administrative purposes. The office was established in the 12th century, either by Alexander I or by his successor, David I. The title of 'Justiciar' was reserved for two or three high officials, the chief one—the Justiciar of Scotia—having his jurisdiction to the north of the River Forth. The Justiciar of Lothian dealt with the part of the kingdom south of the Forth-Clyde line. The role of justiciar evolved into the current Lord Justice-General, the head of the High Court of Justiciary, head of the judiciary in Scotland, and a member of the Royal Household. The Duke of Argyll still holds the hereditary title of High Justiciar of Argyll, but no responsibilities now attach to it.

== Wales ==
Following Edward I of England's conquest of the Principality of Wales (1277–1283), the Statute of Rhuddlan established the governance of the areas of Wales under direct royal control. The new counties of Anglesey, Caernarfonshire and Merioneth were administered on behalf of the king by the Justiciar of North Wales, while Carmarthenshire and Cardiganshire were placed under the control of the Justiciar of South Wales.

== Ireland ==
The title justiciar or chief justiciar was commonly borne by the chief governor of Ireland in the centuries after the Norman invasion of Ireland. By the fifteenth century the chief governor was usually styled the King's Lieutenant, with the justiciar a subordinate role that evolved into the Lords Justices of Ireland.

== Other jurisdictions ==
The title Justiciar was given by Henry II of England to the Seneschal of Normandy.

In the 12th century, a magister justitiarius appeared in the Norman kingdom of Sicily, presiding over the Royal Court (Magna Curia), empowered, with his assistants, to decide, inter alia, all cases reserved to the Crown. There is no clear evidence that this title and office were borrowed from England; it was probably based on a Norman practice instituted in both realms. In the 13th century the office of justiciar was instituted in several principal localities around Sicily.

In medieval Sweden, the lagman ("lawspeaker") was the judge, or person learned in law, for a province, an area with several local district courts. Since the position corresponds to the general meaning of "justiciar", "justiciar" is often used to translate "lagman" in English texts. Lagmän (plural) were generally also members of the Senate of the realm, an institution corresponding to the English Privy Council. Finally, the Swedish term "riksdrots" is often translated as "Lord High Justiciar of Sweden".
