= Old Sarum Cathedral =

Grade I listed cathedral in old Salisbury in United Kingdom

Coordinates: 51.0942°N 1.8064°W

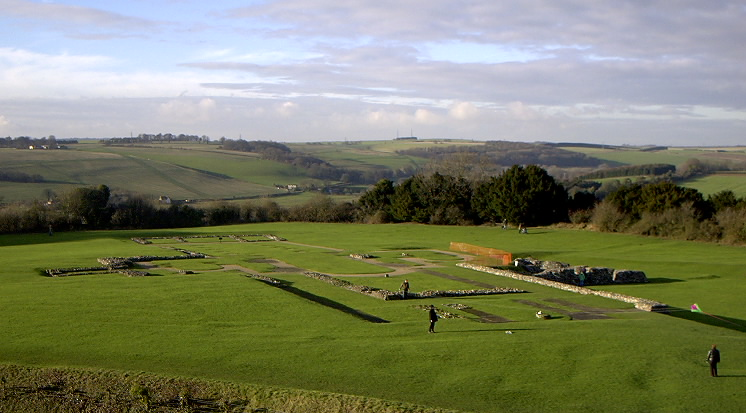
The site in 2000, showing the exposed foundations of the former cathedral

Old Sarum Cathedral was a Catholic cathedral at old Salisbury, England, now known as Old Sarum, between 1092 and 1220. Only its foundations remain, in the north-west quadrant of the circular outer bailey of the site, about 2 miles (3.2 km) north of its 13th-century replacement, Salisbury Cathedral. The cathedral was the seat of the bishops of Salisbury during the early Norman period and the original source of the Sarum Rite.

== Description ==
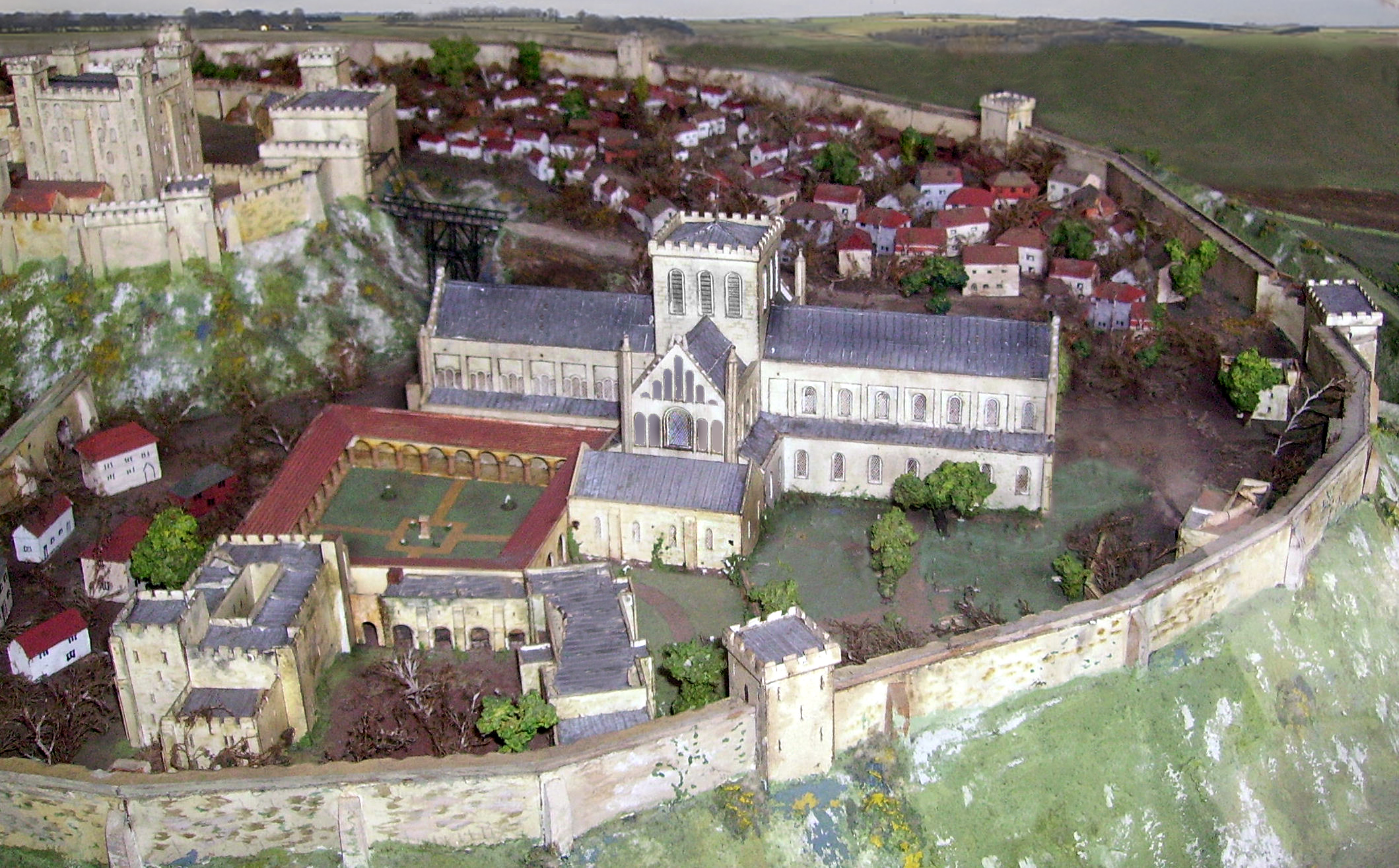
A 1927 model of the former cathedral, now displayed in its replacement

At its largest, the Norman cathedral was 185 feet (56 m) from end to end, smaller than most of the cathedrals being constructed at the time. Built in the standard cruciform shape, the building had a nave of seven bays with cross-shaped piers, an apse and a central crossing tower, as well as several peripheral chapels.

The cathedral's six altars comprised the high altar in the presbytery; the altars of St Martin, St Nicholas, and All Saints in three apsidal chapels in the easternmost wall of the church; and the altars of the Holy Cross (the parish altar) and St Stephen in the nave, set against the western side of the pulpitum.

== History ==
During the Norman conquest of England following his 1066 victory at Hastings, King William I used Old Sarum (known at the time by variants of "Saresbury" or "Salisbury") as a base of operations. It was within a newly constructed strong fortress on a high hill (originally the Old Sarum Hill Fort) and was surrounded by the massive walls of the new fortress. In 1075, the Council of London translated Herman to Old Sarum as Seriberiensis episcopus, "bishop of Seribury". The see was a new foundation, uniting the former dioceses of Sherborne and Ramsbury. (Herman's initial choice for his seat had been at Malmesbury, but this plan had been blocked by the local monks and Earl Godwin.) Its district covered the counties of Dorset, Wiltshire, and Berkshire.

The cathedral was begun shortly afterwards but was not completed until after Herman's death in 1078. His successor was Saint Osmund, count of Sées and Lord Chancellor of England. Osmund was William's cousin and largely responsible for the education of Henry I. The cathedral was consecrated on 5 April 1092 with John of Tours, bishop of Bath, in attendance. It suffered extensive damage in a storm, however, traditionally said to have occurred only five days later.

Osmund's successor (after a vacancy of four years) was Roger of Salisbury, who was not formally consecrated for another five years owing to a dispute between King Henry I and Archbishop Anselm. Roger rebuilt and enlarged sections of the cathedral, completing construction around 1120. Unusually, most of the flooring in the new sections of the cathedral was in patterns of green and white stone. He also served as Henry's viceroy while the king was in Normandy and was closely connected with King Stephen during his reign. Roger constructed a royal palace at Old Sarum between 1130 and 1139. In that year, Stephen antagonized the clergy by demanding the surrender of the castles held by Roger's family, including Old Sarum Castle. He was arrested and his lands sequestrated, dying before the arrival of Matilda and Stephen's deposition.

A dispute between King Stephen and Henry, bishop of Winchester and the papal legate in England, left the see vacant for three years before the consecration of Josceline de Bohon. Around 1150, he obtained permission from Archbishop Theobald to move the cathedral's Feast of the Relics to September 17, a double feast which permitted pilgrims a 40-day indulgence. Around the same time, the central apse was developed into a single-story chapel while the altar and reliquary were moved into the chancel. Josceline was excommunicated by Archbishop Thomas Becket in 1170, ostensibly for having assisted in the coronation of Henry II's son Henry. His case was ignored by Rome until after Becket's assassination: he was finally pardoned in 1172 and held his see until his resignation to become a Cistercian monk in 1184.

The see was again vacant for another five years before the consecration of Hubert Walter at the behest of the newly installed King Richard I. Richard's father Henry II had maintained the vacancy in order to retain its revenue, but Walter had been duly elected by the cathedral chapter at York and Richard provided him the position at Sarum in order to name his own half-brother Geoffrey as archbishop. Walter then abandoned his appeal to Rome and accompanied Richard on the Third Crusade. While abroad, he negotiated with Saladin and completed a pilgrimage to Jerusalem, but he was translated to Canterbury upon his return.

The next bishop, Herbert Poore, was elected and consecrated the next year in 1194. He succeeded in naming his brother Richard as dean of the cathedral chapter in 1197 and the two of them received permission from King Richard to move the cathedral from Old Sarum, where it was exposed and lacked a large water supply, sometime before the turn of the century. The 12th-century Peter of Blois had described the old church site as "barren, dry, and solitary, exposed to the rage of the wind" and the cathedral itself as "a captive on the hill where it was built, like the ark of God shut up in the profane house of Baal." Bishop Herbert was, however, disliked by Walter, now archbishop over the diocese. He was dispossessed of his lands and forced into exile in Normandy in 1198. He was unable to return to his see until he paid a further large fine. Herbert eventually befriended King John but was unable to accomplish much in the chaos surrounding his reign. Bishop Herbert fled to Scotland in 1209 during the interdict against King John and was not restored to his diocese's temporalities until 1213. He died in 1217 and his diocese was given to his brother Richard.

A dispute between Richard and the military garrison at Old Sarum led to Richard receiving royal permission to move his seat to his estate at Merryfield in the Salisbury Plain. Old Sarum Cathedral was slowly dismantled, with its stone transported to the new site and used to construct the present Salisbury Cathedral, whose site was consecrated in 1220. The new Early English-style cathedral was completed by 1258. A licence to build the new cathedral close wall with stone from the ruins of the Old Sarum cathedral was granted in 1327; it was completed in 1331. The remains at the cathedral seem to have initially been left undisturbed: it was not until July 23 in the year of his canonization, 1457, that the relics of Saint Osmund were translated to Salisbury Cathedral.

The remains of the cathedral, together with the ruined 12th and 13th century fortifications, were designated as Grade I listed in 1972.

== Excavation ==
The Society of Antiquaries of London embarked on an excavation campaign from 1909 to 1915, until being interrupted by the First World War. The project's director, William Henry St John Hope, died in 1919 without formally publishing any findings. Many artifacts were taken into the collections of The Salisbury Museum.
