= Old Sarum =

Site of the earliest settlement of Salisbury in England

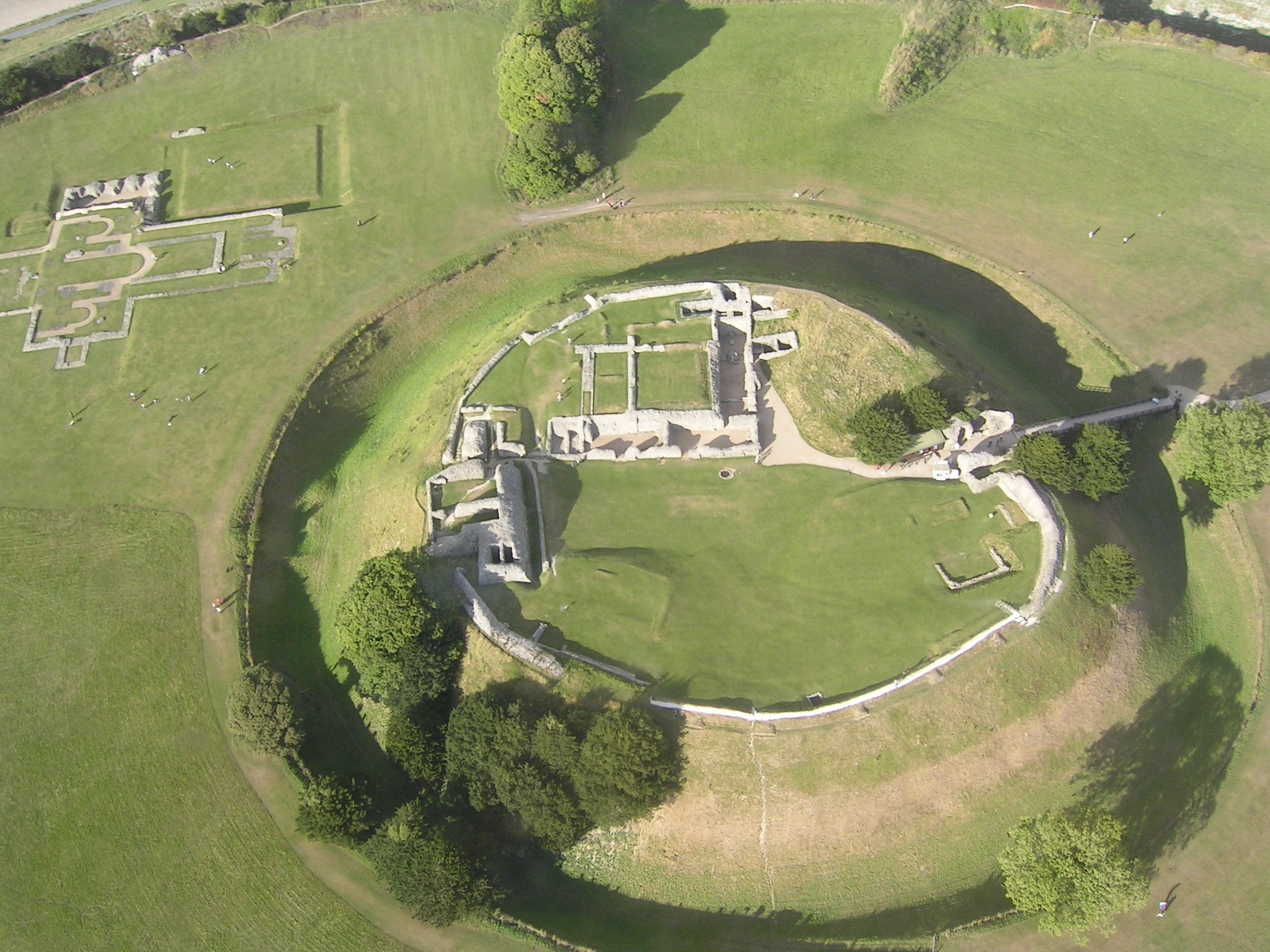
- Partial aerial view of Old Sarum. The motte is at centre, with remains of the castle, and the foundations of the cathedral are to the left in the bailey.

- Location within Wiltshire
- Interactive map of area around Old Sarum
- 51°05′36″N 01°48′17″W
- Type: Iron Age hillfort, Motte-and-bailey castle
- Location: Wiltshire, England
- Region: South West England
- Nearest city: Salisbury

History
- Built: about 400BC, about AD 1068

Site notes
- Public access: yes (free access to bailey, charged access to motte
- Website: https://www.english-heritage.org.uk/visit/places/old-sarum/

Identifiers
- NHLE: 1015675
- Atlas of Hillforts: 0406

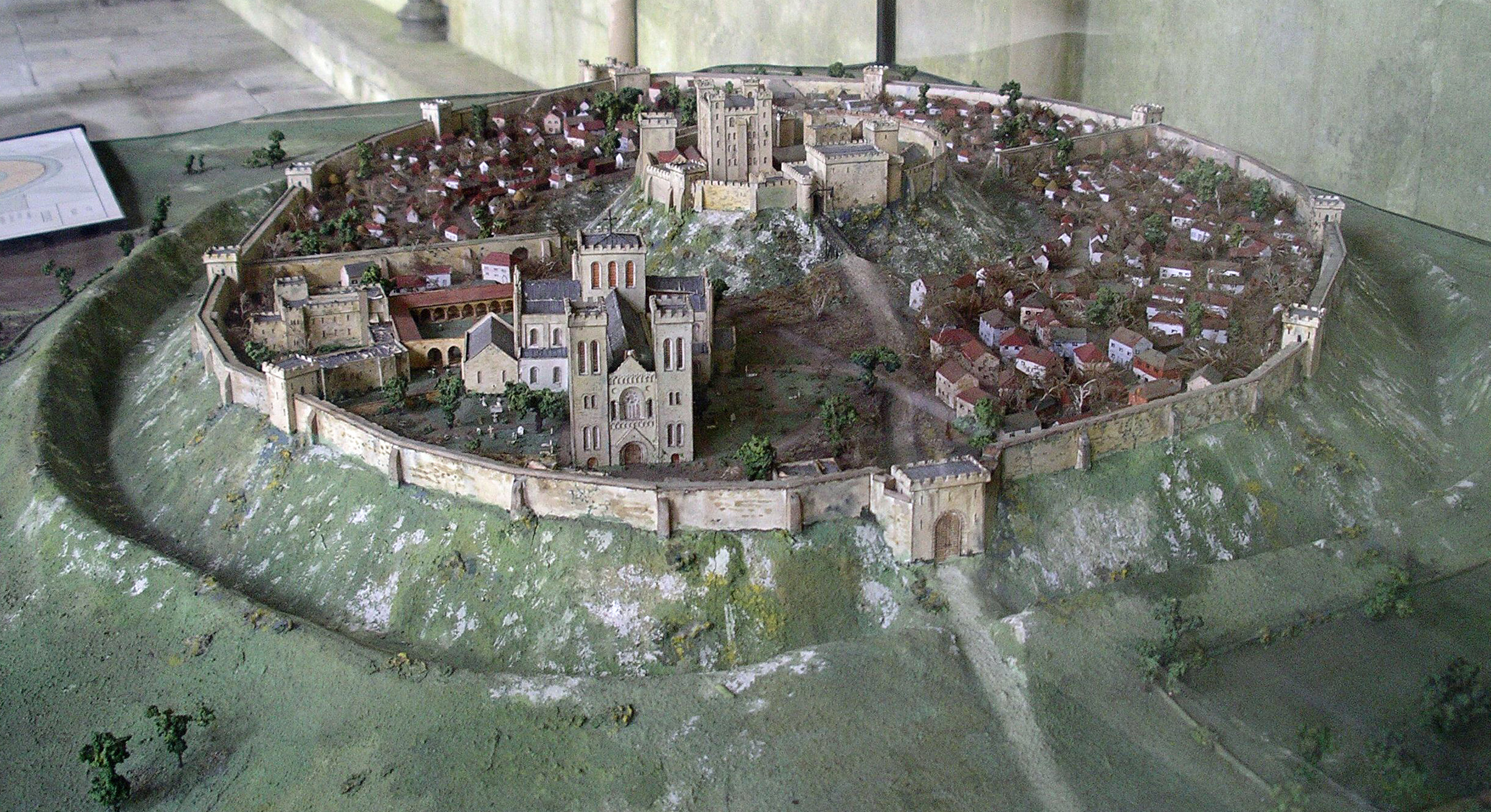
A reconstruction of Old Sarum as in the 12th century, housed at Salisbury Cathedral

Old Sarum, in Wiltshire, South West England, is the ruined and deserted site of the earliest settlement of Salisbury. Situated on a hill about two miles (three kilometres) north of modern Salisbury near the A345 road, the settlement appears in some of the earliest records in the country. It is an English Heritage property and is open to the public.

The great stone circles of Stonehenge and Avebury are near Old Sarum and indications of prehistoric settlement at the site have been discovered from as early as 3000 BC. Around 400 BC, during the Iron Age, a hillfort was erected, controlling the intersection of two trade paths and the River Avon. The site continued to be occupied during the Roman period, when the paths were made into roads. The Saxons took the British fort in the 6th century and later used it as a stronghold against Vikings. The Normans constructed a motte and bailey castle, a stone curtain wall, and Old Sarum Cathedral. A royal palace was built within Old Sarum Castle for King Henry I and was subsequently used by Plantagenet monarchs. This heyday of the settlement lasted for around 300 years until disputes between the Sheriff of Wiltshire, keeper of the castle, and the Bishop of Salisbury at the cathedral finally led to the removal of the church into the nearby plain. As New Salisbury grew up around the construction site for the new cathedral in the early 13th century, buildings at Old Sarum were dismantled for their stone and the old town dwindled. Its long-neglected castle was abandoned by Edward II in 1322 and sold by Henry VIII in 1514.

Although the settlement was effectively uninhabited by the 17th century, its landowners continued to have parliamentary representation into the 19th century, making it one of the most notorious of the rotten boroughs that existed before the Reform Act 1832. Old Sarum served as a pocket borough of the Pitt family.

Old Sarum is also the name of a modern settlement north-east of the monument, where there is a grass strip airfield and business parks, and large 21st-century housing developments at Old Sarum and Longhedge.

== Name ==
The present name seems to be a ghost word or corruption of the medieval Latin and Norman forms of the name Salisbury, such as the Sarisburie that appeared in the Domesday Book of 1086. (These were adaptions of the earlier names Searoburh, Searobyrig, and Searesbyrig, calques of the indigenous Brittonic name with the Old English suffixes -burh and -byrig, denoting fortresses or their adjacent settlements.) The longer name was first abbreviated as Sar̅, but, as such a mark was used to contract the Latin suffix -um (common in placenames), the name was confused and became Sarum sometime around the 13th century. The earliest known use was on the seal of the St Nicholas hospital at New Salisbury, which was in use in 1239. The 14th-century Bishop Wyvil was the first to describe himself as episcopus Sarum.

The addition of "old" to the name distinguished it from Sarum or New Sarum, names used in some contexts for the newer settlement.

== History ==
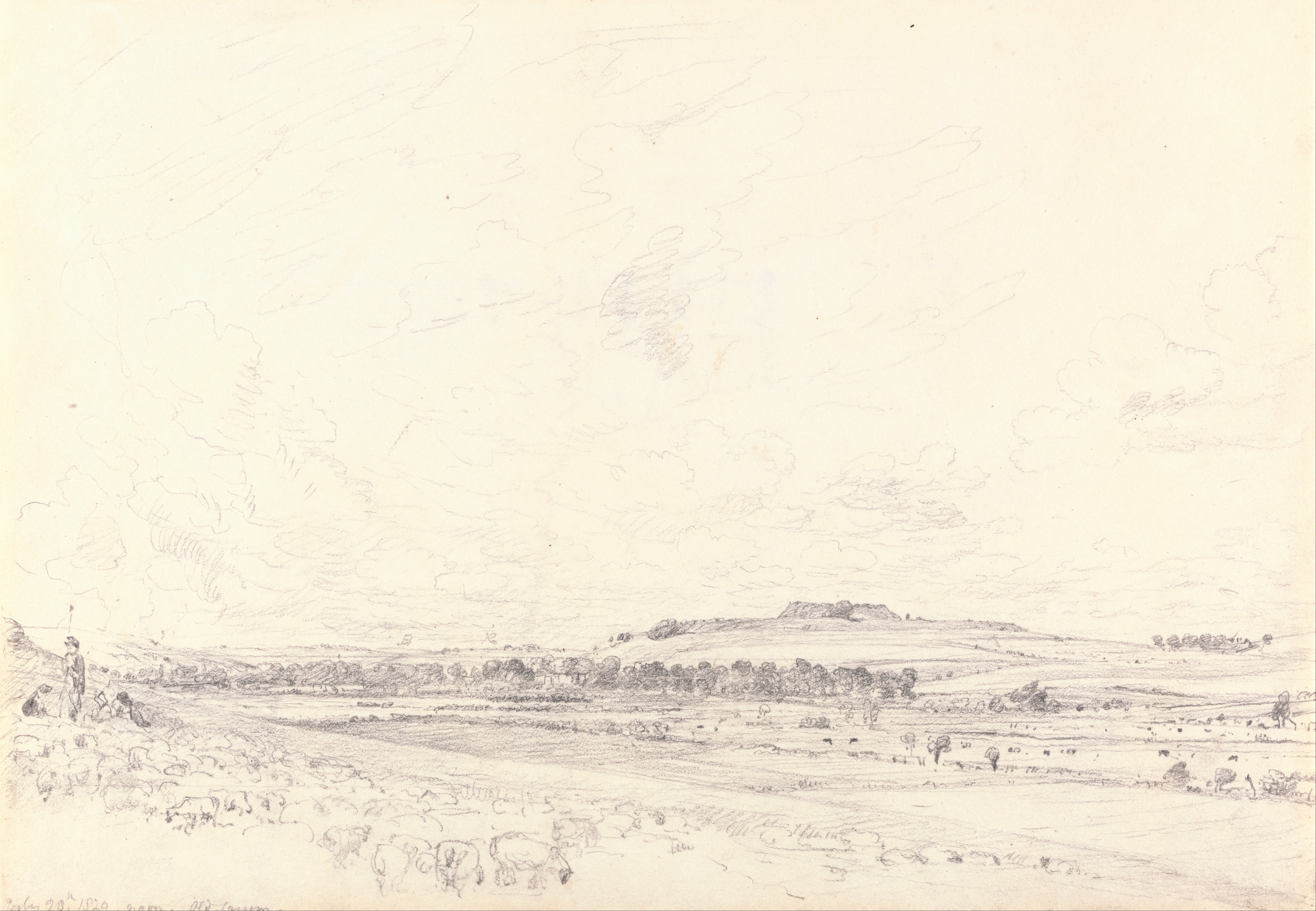
An 1829 sketch of Old Sarum by John Constable, displaying the site of the abandoned hillfort

=== Prehistory ===
There is evidence that early hunters and, later, farming communities occupied the site. A protective hill fort, named Sorviodunum, was constructed by the local inhabitants around 400 BC during the Iron Age by creating enormous banks and ditches surrounding the hill. The hillfort is broadly oval shaped, measuring 400 m (1,300 ft) in length and 360 m (1,180 ft) in width. It consists of a double bank and intermediate ditch with an entrance on the eastern side.

Numerous other hillforts of the same period can be found locally, including Figsbury Ring to the east and Vespasian's Camp to the north. The archaeologist Sir R. C. Hoare described it as "a city of high note in the remotest periods by the several barrows near it, and its proximity to the two largest stone circles in England, namely, Stonehenge and Avebury." (Note: The Ancient History of Wiltshire (Vol. 2?) — Sir R. C. Hoare, speaking of Stonehenge, expresses his opinion that "our earliest inhabitants were Celts, who naturally introduced with them their own buildings customs, rites, and religions ceremonies, and to them I attribute the erection of Stonehenge, and the greater part of the sepulchral memorials that still continue to render its environs so truly interesting to the antiquary and historian." Abury, or Avebury, is a village amidst the remains of an immense temple, which for magnificence and extent is supposed to have exceeded the more celebrated fabric of Stonehenge; some enthusiastic inquirers have however, carried their supposition beyond probability, and in their zeal have even supposed them to be antediluvian labours! Many of the barrows in the vicinity of Sarum have been opened, and in them several antiquarian relics have been discovered. In short, the whole county is one of high antiquarian interest, and its history has been illustrated with due fidelity and research. This has led more recent scholars to doubt the original inhabitants were actually Celts. It is now believed they may have been the much earlier "Beaker People", so named for the beaker-shaped pots they made.)

=== Roman period ===
At the time of the Roman conquest of Britain in the 1st century, the area of Old Sarum seems to have formed part of the territory of the Atrebates, a British tribe apparently ruled by Gaulish exiles. Although the dynasty's founder Commius had become a foe of Caesar's, his sons submitted to Augustus as client kings. Their realm became known as the Regni and the overthrow of one of them, Verica, was the casus belli used to justify the Emperor Claudius's invasion. The settlement appeared in the Welsh Chronicle of the Britons as Caer-Caradog or Gradawc (Old Welsh: kaer gradaỽc) and as Caer-Wallawg. Bishop Ussher argued for its identification with the "Cair Caratauc" listed among the 28 cities of Britain by the History of the Britons traditionally ascribed to Nennius.

=== Saxon period ===
Cynric, king of Wessex, captured the hill in 552. It remained part of Wessex thereafter but, preferring settlements in bottomland like nearby Wilton, the Saxons largely ignored Old Sarum until the Viking invasions led King Alfred to restore its fortifications. In the early part of the 9th century, it was a frequent residence of Egbert of Wessex and, in 960, King Edgar assembled a national council there to plan a defence against the Danes in the north. Along with Wilton, it was abandoned by its residents to be sacked and burned by the Dano-Norwegian king Sweyn Forkbeard in 1003. It subsequently became the site of Wilton's mint.

=== Norman period ===
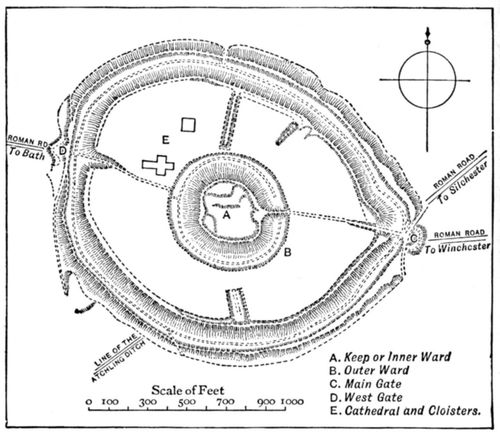
A 1916 plan of Old Sarum by the Ordnance Survey (300 ft ≈ 92 m)

A motte-and-bailey castle was built by 1069, three years after the Norman Conquest. The castle was held directly by the Norman kings; its castellan was generally also the sheriff of Wiltshire. In 1075, the Council of London established Herman as the first bishop of Salisbury (Seriberiensis episcopus), uniting his former sees of Sherborne and Ramsbury into a single diocese which covered the counties of Dorset, Wiltshire, and Berkshire. He and Saint Osmund began the construction of the first Salisbury cathedral but neither lived to see its completion in 1092. Osmund was a cousin of William the Conqueror and Lord Chancellor of England; he was responsible for the codification of the Sarum Rite, the compilation of the Domesday Book, and—after centuries of advocacy from Salisbury's bishops—was finally canonized by Pope Callixtus III in 1457.

The Domesday Book was probably presented to William the Conqueror at Old Sarum in 1086, the same year he convened the prelates, nobles, sheriffs, and knights of his dominions there to pay him homage by the Oath of Salisbury. Two other national councils were held there: one by William Rufus in 1096 and another by Henry I in 1116, which has sometimes been described as the first English Parliament. William Rufus confirmed its bishop in various additional sources of income, which were later confirmed by Henry II.

The cathedral was consecrated on 5 April 1092 but suffered extensive damage in a storm, traditionally said to have occurred only five days later. Bishop Roger was a close ally of Henry I who served as his viceroy during the king's absence to Normandy and directed the royal administration and exchequer along with his extended family. He refurbished and expanded Old Sarum's cathedral in the 1110s. This work ultimately doubled the cathedral's length and involved the large-scale levelling of the ecclesiastical district in the northwest quadrant of the town. He began work on a royal palace during the 1130s, prior to his arrest by Henry's successor Stephen. This palace was long thought to have been the small structure whose ruins are located in the small central bailey; it may, however, have been the large palace recently discovered in the southeast quadrant of the outer bailey. This palace was 170 m × 65 m (560 ft × 210 ft), surrounded a large central courtyard, and had walls up to 3 m (10 ft) thick. A 60-metre-long (200 ft) room was probably a great hall and there seems to have been a large tower. At the time of Roger's arrest by King Stephen, the bishop administered the castle on the king's behalf; it was thereafter allowed to fall into disrepair but the sheriff and castellan continued to administer the area under the king's authority.

=== Angevin period ===
Medieval Sarum also seems to have had industrial facilities such as kilns and furnaces. Residential areas were principally located in the two southern quadrants, built up beside the ditch protecting the inner bailey and Norman castle. Henry II held his wife, Eleanor of Aquitaine, prisoner at Old Sarum. In the 1190s, the plain between Old Sarum and Wilton was one of five specially designated by Richard I for the holding of English tournaments.

An early 12th-century observer, William of Malmesbury, called Sarum a town "more like a castle than city, being environed with a high wall", and noted that "notwithstanding that it was very well accommodated with all other conveniences, yet such was the want for water that it sold at a great rate". Holinshed denied this and noted that the hill was "very plentifully served with springs and wells of very sweet water"; excavation has discovered numerous wells (including one within the Norman keep) but suggests that they were so deep as to make their use more cumbersome than carting water uphill from the rivers. The issue was presented to kings Richard and John as the prime reason to relocate the cathedral but seems to have only been part of the issue.

The late 12th-century canon Peter of Blois described his prebendary as "barren, dry, and solitary, exposed to the rage of the wind" and the cathedral "as a captive on the hill where it was built, like the ark of God shut up in the profane house of Baal." Holinshed records that the clerics brawled openly with the garrison troops. Bishop Herbert received permission for the move from Richard I, who was agreeably disposed towards the diocese after discovering it held £90 000 in coin in trust for his father, in addition to jewels, vestments, and plate, but was forced to delay the change after John's succession.

By papal order, Herbert's brother Richard Poore was translated from Chichester to succeed him in 1217; the next year, Sarum's dean and chapter presented arguments to Rome for the cathedral's relocation. The investigation of these claims by the papal legate Cardinal Gualo verified the chapter's claims that the site's water was both expensive and sometimes restricted by the castellans; that housing within the walls was insufficient for the clerics, who were required to rent from the laity; that the wind was sometimes so strong that divine offices could not be heard and the roof was repeatedly damaged; and that the soldiers of the royal fortress restricted access to the cathedral precinct to the common folk during Ash Wednesday and on other occasions for providing the Eucharist and the clerics felt imperilled by their circumstances. Pope Honorius III thereupon issued an indulgence to relocate the cathedral on 29 March 1217 or 1218. The chapter voted unanimously for the move and agreed to pay for it by withholding various portions of their prebends over the next seven years. On Easter Monday, 1219, a wooden chapel dedicated to the Virgin Mary was begun near the banks of the Hampshire Avon; on Trinity Sunday, Bishop Poore celebrated mass there and consecrated a cemetery. On St Vitalis's Day, April 28, 1220, the foundation of the future stone cathedral was begun.

The settlement that grew up around it was called New Salisbury, then (at least formally) New Sarum, then finally Salisbury. The former cathedral was formally dissolved in 1226. The inhabitants of the new city gradually razed the old, constructing Salisbury Cathedral and other buildings from the materials at Old Sarum. Evidence of quarrying into the 14th century shows some continued habitation, but the settlement was largely abandoned and Edward II ordered the castle's demolition in 1322.

=== Aftermath ===
In 1331 Edward III wrote letters to the Bishop of Salisbury authorising the removal of stone from the former cathedral and the houses previously used by Bishop and the Cathedral’s clerics. He also gave them permission to rebuild the Chapel of St Mary that was previously located within the cathedral. It is unclear if the chapel was rebuilt or remained in place but Salisbury Cathedral’s Chapter Act books indicate it continued to exist and function as a chantry chapel. Repairs to the chapel were carried out between 1529 and 1531. It ceased to be used sometime before 1550.

=== Modern period ===
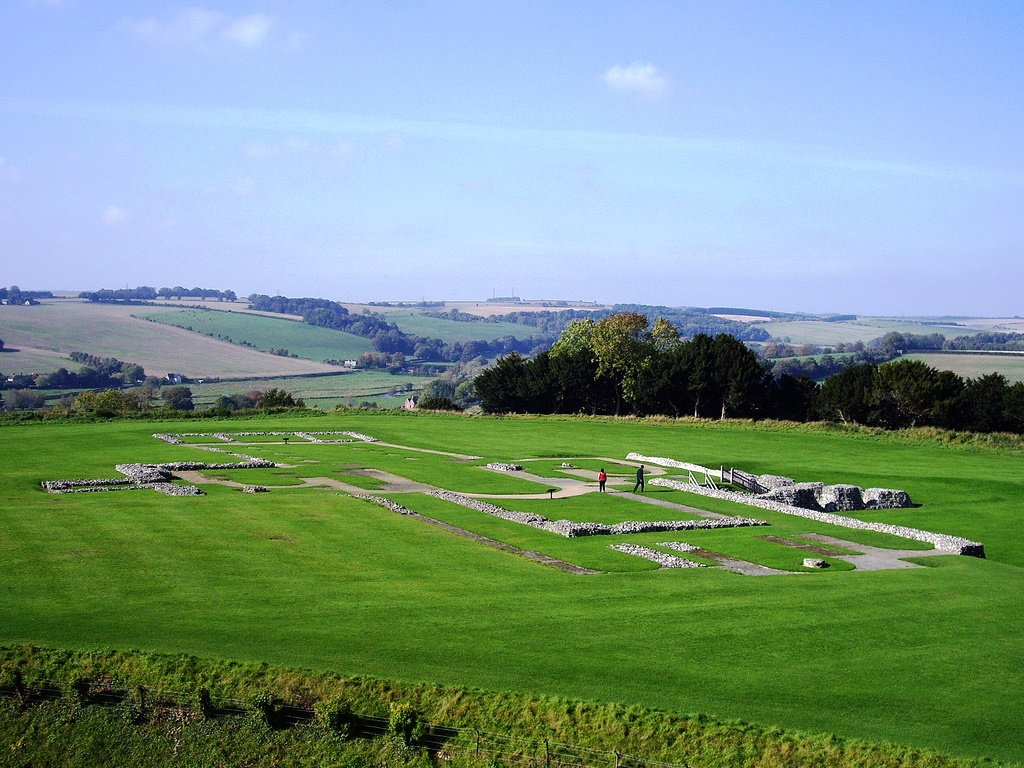
The exposed foundations of the cathedral

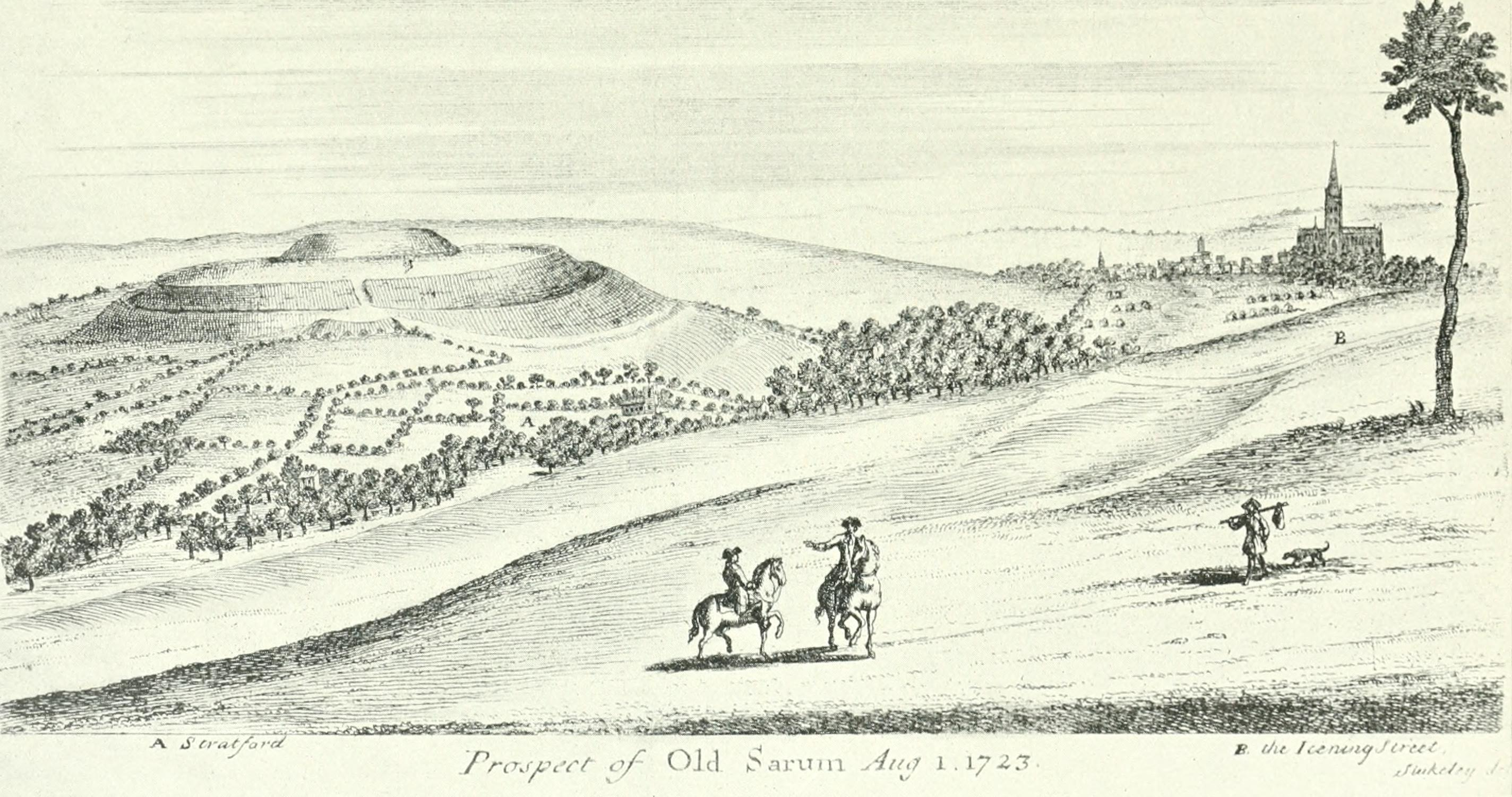
Old Sarum in 1723

The castle grounds were sold by Henry VIII in 1514. From the reign of Edward II in the 14th century, the borough of Old Sarum elected two Members of Parliament to the House of Commons despite having, from at least the 17th century, no resident voters. One of the members in the 18th century was William Pitt the Elder. In 1831, Old Sarum had eleven voters, all of whom were landowners who lived elsewhere, making Old Sarum the most notorious of the rotten boroughs. The Reform Act 1832 subsumed the Old Sarum area into an enlarged borough of Wilton. The fortified site was an extra-parochial area and became a civil parish in 1858, but the civil parish was abolished in 1894 and merged with Stratford sub Castle. In 1891 the parish had a population of 13. The site and surrounding area is now the northernmost part of Salisbury civil parish.

The site of the castle and cathedral is considered a highly important British monument: it was among the 26 English locations scheduled by the 1882 Ancient Monuments Protection Act, the first such British legislation. That protection has subsequently continued, expanding to include some suburban areas west and south-east of the outer bailey. It was also listed as a Grade I site in 1972.

Between 1909 and 1915, W.H. St J. Hope, W. Hawley, and D.H. Montgomerie excavated the site for the Society of Antiquaries of London. A second excavation occurred in the 1950s under John W. G. Musty and Philip Rahtz.

In 2014, an on-site geophysical survey of the inner and outer bailey by the University of Southampton revealed its royal palace, as well as the street plan of the medieval city. The survey made use of soil resistivity to electric current, electrical resistivity tomography, magnetometry, and ground-penetrating radar. The team planned to return in 2015 to complete a similar survey of the Romano-British site to the south of the hillfort.

== 20th and 21st centuries ==
The Old Sarum monument is now administered by English Heritage, and non-members are charged for admission. A paved carpark and grass overflow carpark are provided in the eastern area of the outer bailey.

In 1917, during World War I, farmland about 1 mile (1.6 km) north-east of Old Sarum, along the Portway, was developed as the 'Ford Farm' aerodrome. That became Old Sarum Airfield, which remained in operation with a single grass runway until at least 2019 with a small business park which developed along the north edge of the airfield. As of January 2023 the airfield is still operational, but only by prior arrangement.

Around 800 homes were built on the north side of the Portway between 2008 and 2016, and this area (which includes Old Sarum Primary School) is also called Old Sarum. From 2018, further housing called Longhedge Village, around 750 homes accessed from the A345, was built immediately north of the earlier development. These areas all fall within Laverstock civil parish, while the monument itself – separated from modern development by about 0.6 miles (1 km) of farmland – is within the Salisbury City area.

Drone view of Old Sarum

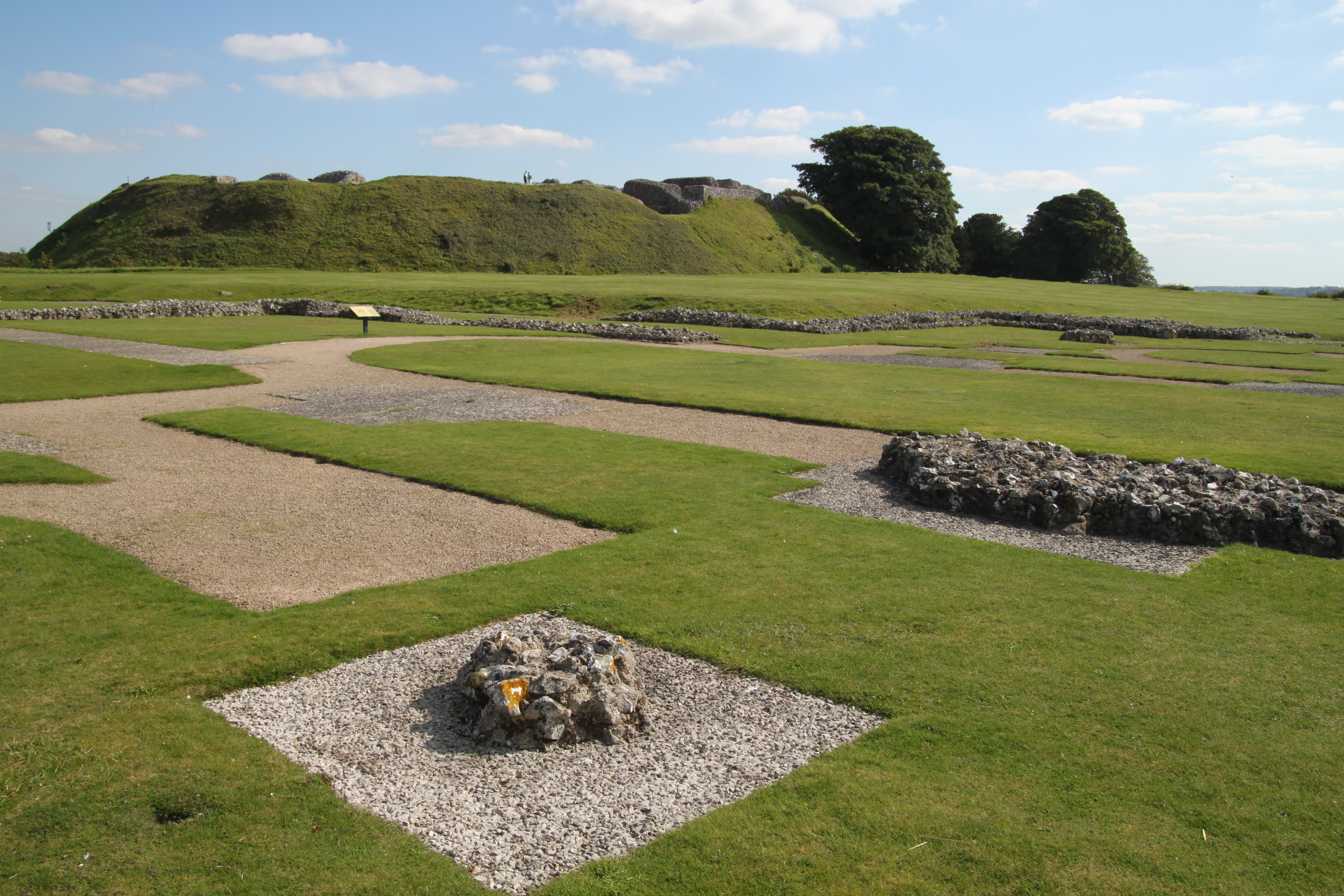
The present ruins: the exposed foundations of the cathedral in the foreground and the Norman central motte behind

== See also ==
- List of castles in England
