= Richard Poore =

13th-century Bishop of Chichester, Bishop of Durham, and Bishop of Salisbury

- Bishop of Durham
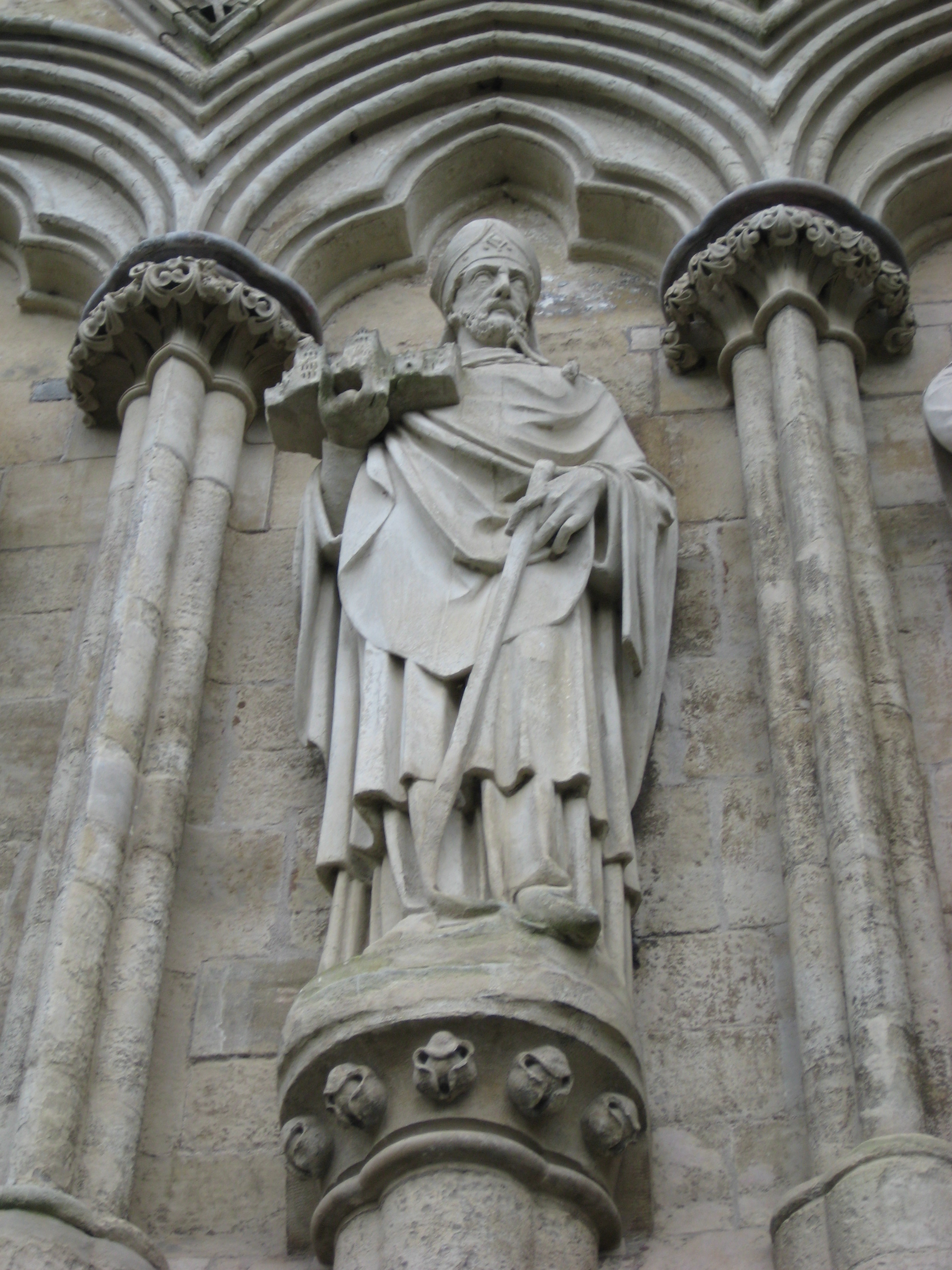
- Sculpture on the west front of Salisbury Cathedral of Richard Poore, holding a model of the cathedral in his hand
- Appointed: 14 May 1228
- Term ended: 15 April 1237
- Predecessor: William Scot
- Successor: Thomas de Melsonby
- Other posts: Bishop of Chichester; Bishop of Salisbury; Dean of Salisbury

Orders
- Consecration: 25 January 1215

Personal details
- Died: 15 April 1237 Tarrant Keyneston, Dorset
- Buried: probably church at Tarrant Keyneston, Dorset
- Denomination: Catholic

Richard Poore or Poor (died 15 April 1237) was a medieval English bishop best known for his role in the establishment of Salisbury Cathedral and the City of Salisbury, moved from the nearby fortress of Old Sarum. He served as Bishop of Chichester, Bishop of Salisbury and Bishop of Durham.

== Early life ==
Poore was probably the son of Richard of Ilchester, also known as Richard Toclive, who served as Bishop of Winchester. He was the brother of Herbert Poore, who served as bishop of Salisbury from 1194 to 1217. Richard studied under Stephen Langton at Paris. Richard Poore became Dean of Salisbury in 1197, was nominated unsuccessfully to the see of Winchester in 1205, and attained the see of Durham in 1213. His election to Durham was disallowed by Pope Innocent III before it was made public, probably because the pope knew that King John wished for the translation of his advisor John de Gray from the see of Norwich to Durham. During the interdict on England during King John's reign, Richard returned to Paris to teach until the interdict was lifted.

It was probably during these years, before Poore held an episcopal office, that he completed Osmund's Institutio, as well as his own works the Ordinale and the Consuetudinarium. The Institutio detailed the duties of the cathedral clergy at Salisbury, along with their rights. The Ordinale covered the liturgy, and how the various specialised services interacted with the basic divine service. The last work, the Consuetudinarium, gave the customs of Salisbury itself. Both the Consuetudinarium and the Ordinale were basically guides to the Sarum Rite, the usual form of liturgy in thirteenth century England. While he was dean, he also encouraged Robert of Flamborough to write a penitential.

Poore was Bishop of Chichester in 1215, being elected about 7 January and consecrated on 25 January at Reading. He attended the Fourth Lateran Council in 1215. He also served as one of the executors of King John's estate.

== Bishop of Salisbury ==
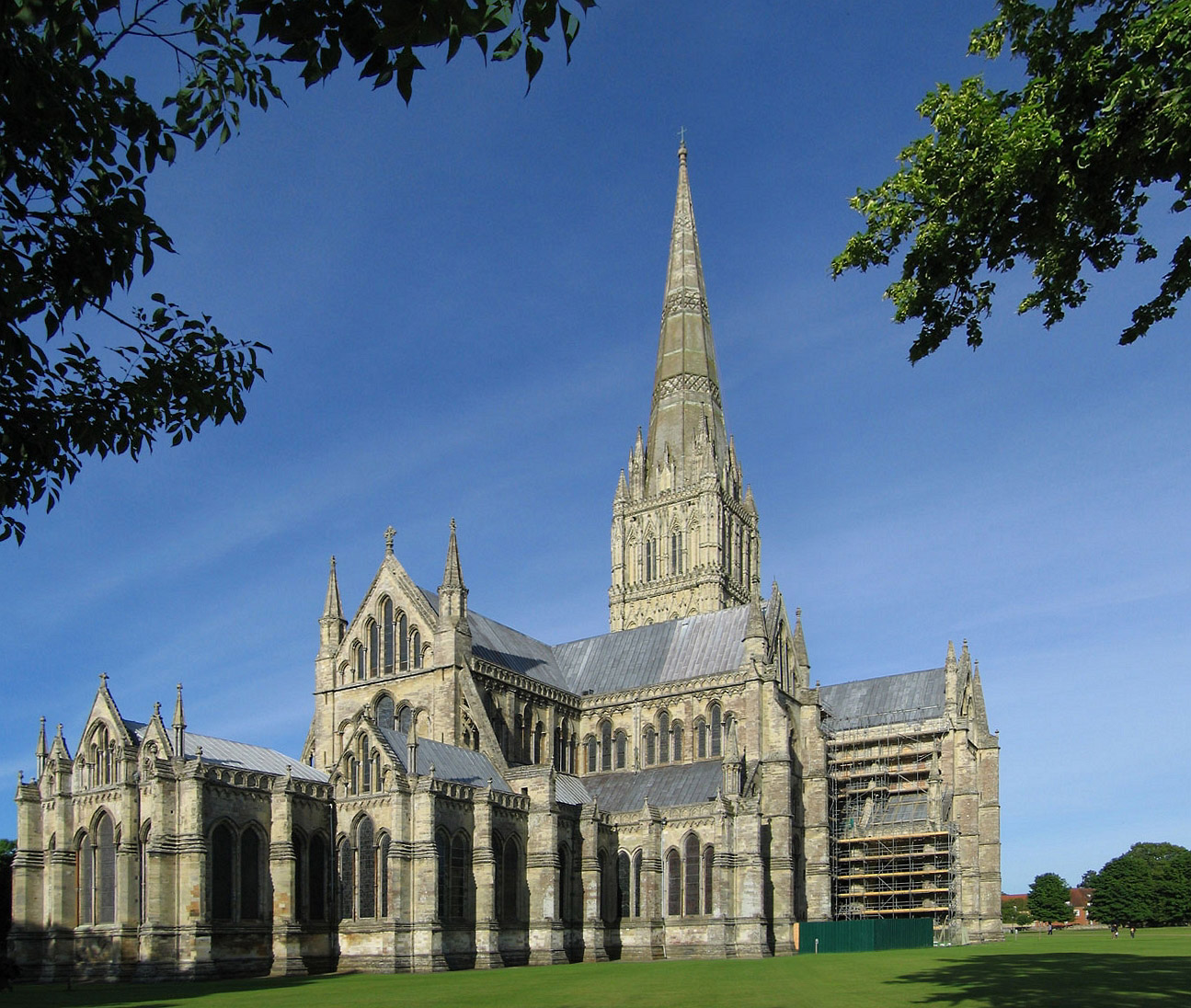
Salisbury Cathedral's construction was started by Richard Poore

Poore's brother Herbert died in 1217, and Richard succeeded to his position as Bishop of Salisbury by 27 June. He owed his move to the see of Salisbury to the papal legate, Cardinal Guala Bicchieri. It was during this time that he oversaw and helped plan the construction of the new Salisbury Cathedral as a replacement for the old cathedral at Old Sarum. He also laid out the town of Salisbury in 1219, to allow the workers building the cathedral a less cramped town than the old garrison town at Old Sarum. The cathedral, however, was not dedicated until 1258.

It was while Poore was at Salisbury that he issued his Statutes of Durham, which derived their name from the fact that he reissued them after being moved to the see of Durham. These statutes were influential on much other episcopal legislation. He also welcomed the first Franciscan friars to Salisbury around 1225. He served as a royal justice in 1218 and 1219. In 1223, with the fall from power of Peter des Roches (bishop of Winchester), Ranulph earl of Chester, and Falkes de Bréauté, Poore helped Hubert de Burgh take over the government, along with Stephen Langton and Jocelin of Wells (bishop of Bath and Wells). The four men worked together to govern England for the next five years.

While Poore was at Salisbury, he took part in the translation of St Wulfstan in 1218, and in the translation of Saint Thomas Becket's relics in 1220. At the later event, he was the only other bishop besides Stephen Langton actually to examine Becket's body. Poore petitioned Pope Gregory IX to have the second bishop of Salisbury, Osmund de Sees, canonized, but was unsuccessful. Osmund was eventually made a saint in 1457.

== Bishop of Durham ==
Poore was translated to the see of Durham on 14 May 1228. Afterwards he withdrew from royal service, although he was briefly back in service when Peter des Roches returned to power in late 1232 and early 1233. At Durham, he inherited a quarrel between the bishop and the cathedral chapter that mainly involved the election of the prior and the right of the bishop to undertake visitations of the priory. The quarrel had begun under Richard Marsh, and had led to appeals to the papal curia from the monks. Soon after coming to Durham, Richard issued a set of detailed constitutions that governed many of the relations between the bishop, the prior, and the cathedral chapter, and which was the basis of church government in Durham until the Dissolution of the monasteries under Henry VIII.

== Legacy and death ==
In 1220, while Poore was bishop of Salisbury, he ordered his clergy to instruct a few children so that the children might in turn teach the rest of the children in basic church doctrine and prayers. He also had the clergy preach every Sunday that children should not be left alone in a house with a fire or water. Also during his time in Salisbury, he promoted the education of boys by endowing some schoolmasters with benefices provided they did not charge for instruction. In 1237, he established a retirement house for the old and infirm clergy of the diocese of Durham. Poore was also an opponent of pluralism, the holding of more than one benefice at the same time. He not only held that a clerk receiving a new benefice should give up the old one, but that if the clerk protested about the loss, he should lose both benefices. He also decreed that the clergy should not be involved in "worldly business". Poore House at Bishop Wordsworth's School, Salisbury is named in honour of his legacy to Salisbury schools.

Poore died on 15 April 1237 at the manor of Tarrant Keyneston in Dorset. His tomb was claimed for both Durham and Salisbury, but most likely he was buried in the church at Tarrant Keyneston which was what he had wished. He is commemorated with a statue in niche 170 on the west front of Salisbury Cathedral.

== Citations ==
Catholic Church titles
Preceded by Godfrey de Luci	Bishop of Winchester election quashed 1205	Succeeded by Peter des Roches
Preceded by Philip of Poitou	Bishop of Durham election quashed 1209–1213	Succeeded by John de Gray
Preceded by Nicholas de Aquila	Bishop of Chichester; 1215–1217	Succeeded by Ranulf of Wareham
Preceded by Herbert Poore	Bishop of Salisbury; 1217–1228	Succeeded by Robert de Bingham
Preceded by William Scot	Bishop of Durham; 1229–1237	Succeeded by Thomas de Melsonby
