= Berthoald (disambiguation) =

Berthoald, Bertoald, Bertald, Britwold, Bertold, Beorhtwald, Brihtwald, Beorhtweald, Berhtwald, Berthwald, or Beretuald is a Germanic masculine given name, derived from beraht (bright) and wald (woods). It could refer to:

- Berthoald, Frankish mayor of the palace
- Berthoald, Duke of Saxony
- Bertwald, Archbishop of Canterbury
- Bertwald of Ramsbury
