= Walter of Kirkham =

13th-century Bishop of Durham

- Bishop of Durham
- Elected: 21 April 1249
- Term ended: 9 August 1260
- Predecessor: Nicholas Farnham
- Successor: Robert Stitchill
- Other post: Dean of York

Orders
- Consecration: 5 December 1249 by Walter de Gray

Personal details
- Died: 9 August 1260
- Buried: 17 August 1260; Durham Cathedral in the chapter house
- Denomination: Catholic

Walter of Kirkham (died 1260) was a medieval English official who held the positions of Keeper of the Wardrobe, Dean of York, and Bishop of Durham. He was elected bishop over Aymer de Valence (later Bishop of Winchester), the brother of King Henry III. As bishop, he was instrumental in the founding of Balliol College in the University of Oxford.

== Early life ==
Walter was probably a native of Kirkham, Yorkshire. From about January 1224 Walter held the office of Keeper of the Wardrobe jointly with Walter Brackley. Brackley was out of office by February 1229, but Walter continued to hold the office until 15 August 1231. He held the office again from May 1234 until October 1236. The record of office for Kirkham and Brackley from 1224 to 1227 is the first record of the king's Wardrobe to survive. The Wardrobe at this time was responsible not only for the household expenses of the king, but also for the expenses of military campaigns and court festivals. He held the office of dean of St. Martin's-le-Grand in London by about 1229. He was a canon of York Minster before being named Dean of York by 21 June 1232.

== Bishop ==
Walter was elected to the see of Durham on 21 April 1249, and was consecrated on 5 December 1249. King Henry III of England had tried to secure the election of the king's half-brother, Aymer de Valence, but did not succeed. Walter was consecrated at York by Walter de Gray, the Archbishop of York. While bishop, in 1255 he ordered an inquiry made into the state of theological knowledge of his clergy. This inquiry was to determine whether the clergy understood the basic dogma of the church and whether they were capable of explaining it to their parishioners. He also issued instructions on how the sacramental wine and bread were to be treated, and forbade the sale of them. Some doubt has recently been cast on the authorship of the statutes that were assigned to his time; they may have been the work of Farnham instead.

Walter attempted to reduce the amount that was going to support his retired predecessor, Farnham, but even though he secured the support of the prior of Durham, they were unsuccessful. He did confirm Farnham's gifts to the monks of Durham, and increased them with gifts of his own. His conflict with John Balliol over a manor both claimed, after an ambush where the bishop's servants were kidnapped, led to Walter imposing a penance on Balliol to support poor scholars at Oxford. This was one of the first steps towards the founding of Balliol College.

In 1257 Walter was part of an embassy to Scotland during King Alexander III of Scotland's minority. Walter's house in London was used by Simon de Montfort during 1258. Walter may have supported Simon in Simon's dispute with King Henry III, for in 1258, Walter refused to come to court and quarrelled with the king. The cause of the quarrel may have been Walter's support of Simon.

== Death ==
Walter died on 9 August 1260 at Howden. He was buried in the Durham Cathedral chapter house on 17 August 1260.

== Citations ==
Catholic Church titles
Preceded by Nicholas Farnham	Bishop of Durham; 1249–1260	Succeeded by Robert Stitchill
