= Robert Stitchill =

13th-century Bishop of Durham

- Bishop of Durham
- Elected: 30 September 1260
- Term ended: 4 August 1274
- Predecessor: Walter of Kirkham
- Successor: Robert of Holy Island

Orders
- Consecration: 13 February 1261 by Godfrey Ludham

Personal details
- Died: 4 August 1274
- Buried: Savigny Abbey
- Denomination: Catholic

Robert Stitchill (sometimes Robert Stichel; died 1274) was a medieval Bishop of Durham in England.

== Life ==
Stitchill probably came from the village of Stichill in Roxburghshire. His father was a priest, and may have been the William Scot who was elected to the see of Durham in 1226. William Scot was never confirmed as bishop, for his election was quashed by Pope Gregory IX in 1227. Stitchill was a monk at Durham Cathedral and prior of a monastic cell at Finchale before he was elected to the see of Durham on 30 September 1260. His dispensation for his illegitimate birth had already been obtained from the pope. He was consecrated bishop on 13 February 1261 at Southwell by Godfrey Ludham, the Archbishop of York.

While bishop, Stitchill gave 1,300 acres (5.3 km^{2}) of land to the monks of his cathedral chapter for their support, as well as books and other gifts. However, there were disputes with the monks over the retirement of their prior, and also over the right of the bishop to oversee the affairs of the chapter. He also founded a hospital at Greatham, County Durham that survived into the modern age. He defended the rights of the bishop to the palatinate of Durham, securing a number of court decisions that upheld the palatinate rights of the bishop.

Stitchill attended the Second Council of Lyon in 1274, where he obtained the permission of Pope Gregory X to resign his see. He died on 4 August 1274 near Lyons, before he was able to return to Durham to resign. He was buried at Savigny Abbey, although his heart was sent to Durham to be buried there.

== Citations ==
Catholic Church titles
Preceded by Walter of Kirkham	Bishop of Durham; 1260–1274	Succeeded by Robert of Holy Island
