= Herbert Poore =

12th and 13th-century Bishop of Salisbury

- Bishop of Salisbury
- Elected: c. 5 May 1194
- Term ended: 1217
- Predecessor: Hubert Walter
- Successor: Richard Poore
- Other posts: Archdeacon of Canterbury

Orders
- Consecration: 5 June 1194

Personal details
- Died: 1217
- Denomination: Catholic

Herbert Poore or Poor (Note: Norman: Hubert or Herbert le Poer - the Norman poer did not necessarily translate the English poor but represents Latin puer, a "boy", and particularly one of good family, a knight.) (Note: Also known as Herbert of Ilchester and Herbert Pauper) (died 1217) was a medieval English clergyman who held the post of Bishop of Salisbury during the reigns of Richard I and John.

== Life ==
Poore was probably the son of Richard of Ilchester, also known as Richard Toclive, who served as Bishop of Winchester. He was the brother of Richard Poore, who succeeded him as bishop. He may have served under his father in the exchequer but is first recorded as an archdeacon of Canterbury in 1175. He was initially one of a trio in the office but, in 1180, Archbishop Richard reversed himself and left Herbert the sole archdeacon for the area. At some point, he also became a canon of Lincoln and Salisbury, entitling him to their prebends.

In his capacity as archdeacon of Canterbury, Herbert enthroned Walter de Coutances as bishop of Lincoln on 11 December 1183. In July the next year, he was one of the men charged by Henry II to instruct the monks of Christ Church, Canterbury, to elect his favorite Bishop Baldwin of Worcester as Richard's successor. From 1185 to 1188, he directed the income of the vacant see of Salisbury and, in May 1186, the chapter at Lincoln elected him to succeed Walter as their bishop. The king refused his consent. The chapter at Salisbury then elected him to succeed Joscelin as the Bishop of Salisbury. The king assented on 14 September 1186 but the minority appealed to the pope owing to Herbert's birth to his father's concubine. (The position was ultimately taken up by Hubert Walter.) On 29 September 1186 he officiated the enthronement of Hugh as bishop of Lincoln and, in May 1193, he appealed to the pope against Hubert Walter's elevation as archbishop of Canterbury, as the king was in captivity and the bishops had not been present at his election. Instead, Celestine presented Hubert with his pallium, the symbol of his new office, and he was enthroned at Canterbury on 7 November.

The canons of Salisbury unanimously elected Herbert as Hubert's successor around 5 May 1194, and the archbishop confirmed the result on 29 April. Herbert was only in deacon's orders at the time; he was ordained as a priest on 4 June, the day before Hubert consecrated him in St Katherine's Chapel at Westminster. He was enthroned at Salisbury on 13 June. In December 1197, Herbert joined St Hugh of Lincoln in denying the king 300 knights for a year's service (Note: At a rate of 3 shillings a day.) in his French wars; when Archbishop Hubert made the same request at the Council of Oxford in February of the next year, they successfully resisted. By the king's orders, all of Herbert's English lands were then seized, until he left to visit Richard personally in Normandy. He was permitted to return to England with his lands and title in June upon payment of a large fine. It was Herbert's idea to move the see from Old Sarum to the Salisbury Plain and he received permission from Richard to that effect, but the plan had to be abandoned after King John came to the throne. It was left to Herbert's brother and successor, Richard, to carry it out decades later, founding modern Salisbury in the process.

Bishop Herbert attended King John's coronation on 27 May 1199. On 19 September 1200, he served as a papal delegate at the reconciliation of Archbishop Geoffrey and the chapter of York at Westminster and, on 22 November, he was present when the king of Scotland paid homage to John at Lincoln. He was summoned to John in Normandy on 14 December 1201. He received six tuns of wine on 2 January 1205.

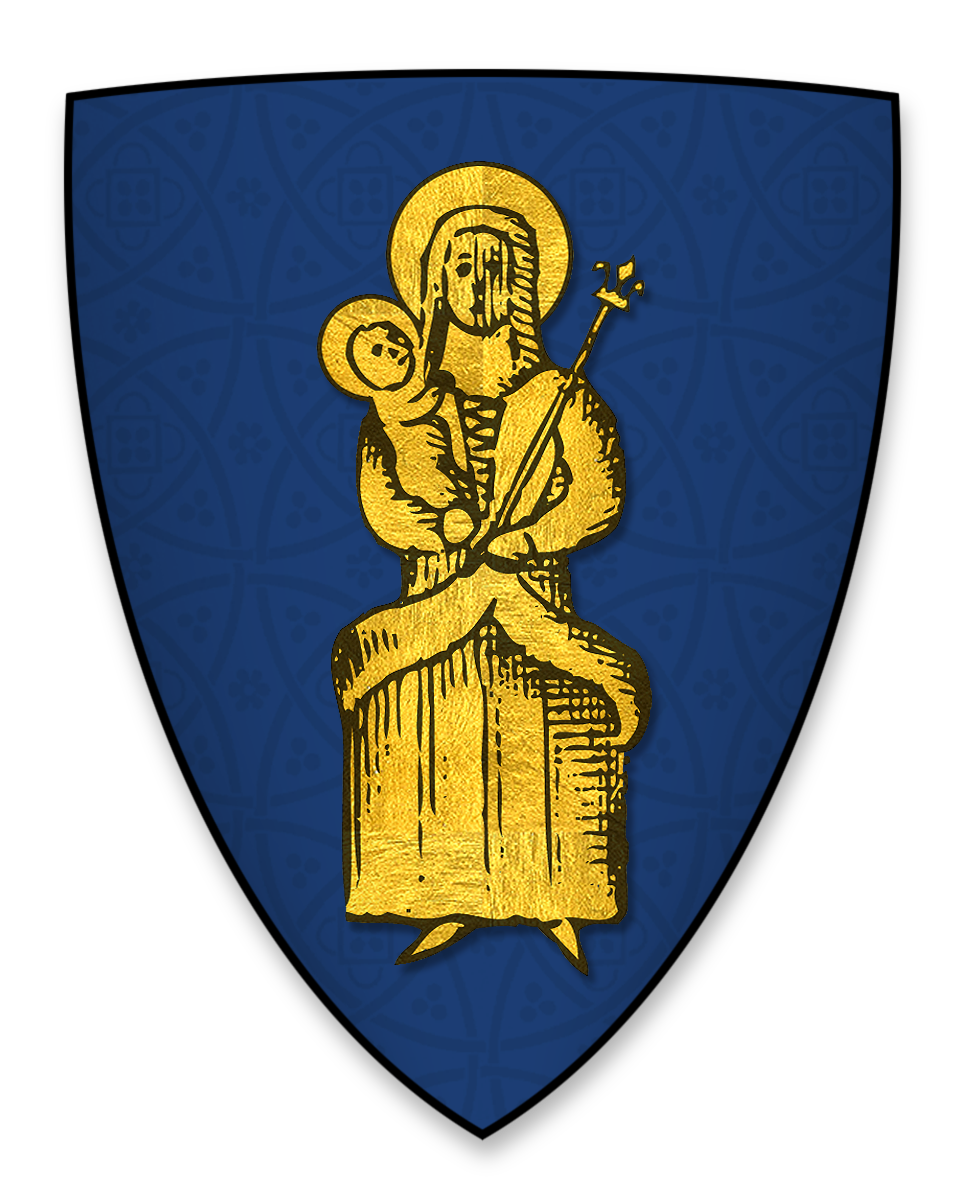
The coat of arms displayed by Herbert Poore, Bishop of Salisbury, at the signing of the Magna Charta

In 1207, the dispute over the appointment of the new archbishop of Canterbury caused Herbert and Bishop Gilbert of Rochester to flee to Scotland. By 27 May 1208, Herbert appears to have returned to Ramsbury but, the next year, Pope Innocent III wrote to him concerning John's failure to pay Richard's widow Berengaria her pension (21 January) and then directed him, along with Bishop Gilbert, to publish the interdict against John. The king was then excommunicated and Herbert again fled to Scotland. In 1212, he and Bishop Gilbert were instructed to release them from their oaths of allegiance to John. In May 1213, John capitulated; Herbert's lands and revenues were ordered restored to him on 18 July.

Herbert died in 1217. Sources variously place the date on 6 February or 9 May while it was commemorated at Salisbury on 7 January. He was not buried at the cathedral church but at Wilton.

== Citations ==
Catholic Church titles
Preceded by Hubert Walter	Bishop of Salisbury; 1194–1217	Succeeded by Richard Poore
