= Godfrey de Lucy =

12th and 13th-century Bishop of Winchester

- Bishop of Winchester
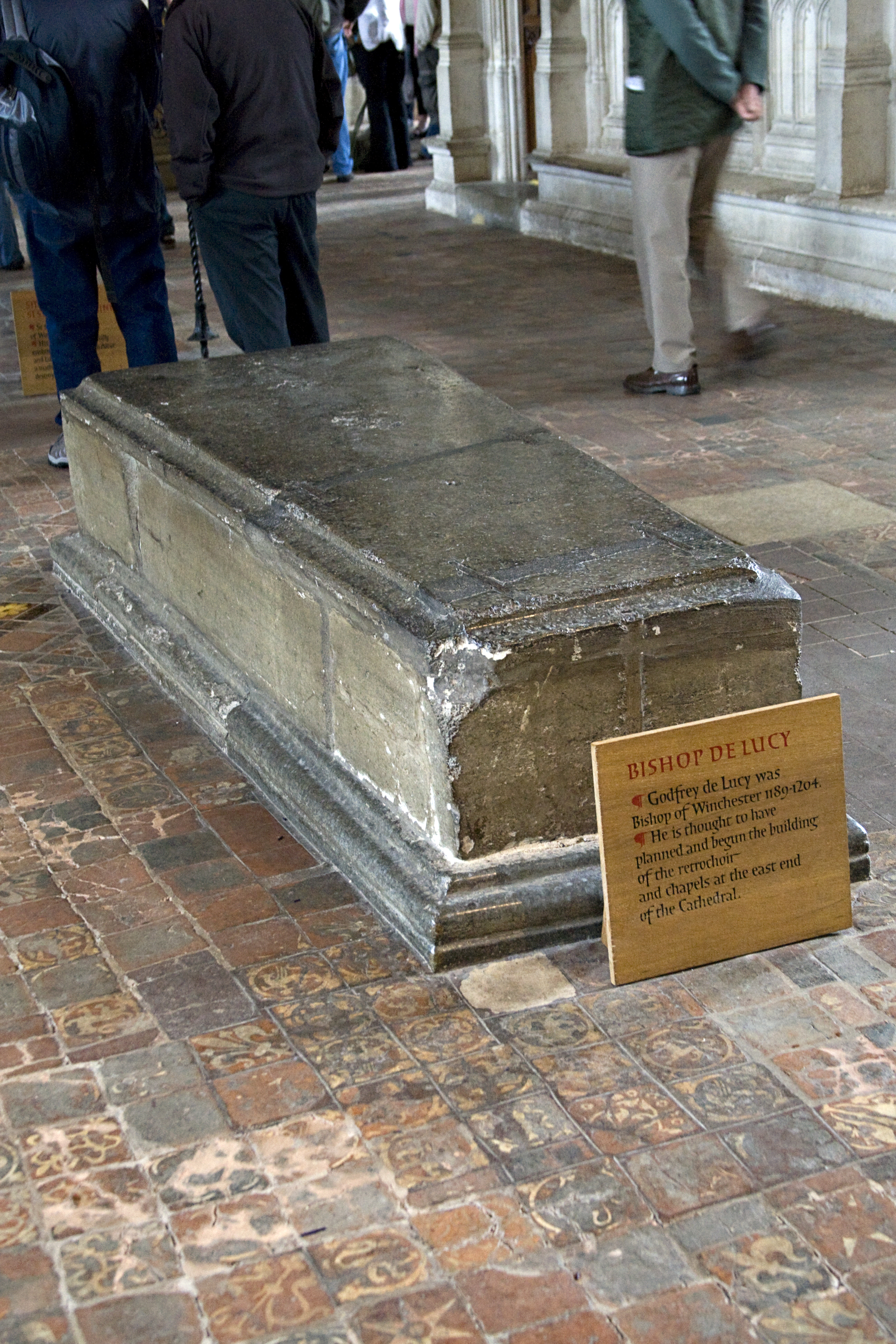
- Appointed: 15 September 1189
- Term ended: 11 or 12 September 1204
- Predecessor: Richard of Ilchester
- Successor: Richard Poore
- Previous post: Archdeacon of Richmond

Orders
- Consecration: 22 October 1189

Personal details
- Died: September 1204
- Denomination: Catholic

Godfrey de Lucy or Luci (d. September 1204) was a medieval Bishop of Winchester.

== Life ==
Godfrey de Lucy was the son of Richard de Lucy and his wife Rohese de Clare or de Boulogne. He had an elder brother Geoffrey, and three sisters, Maud, Alice, and Aveline.

Godfrey was dean of St. Martin le Grand in London before being appointed Archdeacon of Derby in the diocese of Lichfield in about 1171. He was Archdeacon of Richmond in the diocese of York before 18 August 1184. He also held prebends in the dioceses of Exeter, Lincoln, London and Salisbury. He was also a royal justice.

Godfrey was nominated to the see of Winchester 15 September 1189 and consecrated as Bishop on 22 October 1189.

Godfrey was named the guardian of Geoffrey and Richard, the sons of his elder brother Geoffrey, during their minority. Both died without heirs early in the reign of Richard I (r. 1189–1199) and their lands were—after protracted litigation that lasted until the reign of Henry III—divided between their sisters and aunts and their heirs. In 1194, he fell out of favour with King Richard, but by the start of King John's reign he had recovered his lands.

Godfrey died on 11 or 12 September 1204.

== Citations ==
Catholic Church titles
Preceded by Richard of Ilchester	Bishop of Winchester; 1189–1204	Succeeded by Richard Poore
