= Saint Osmund =

11th-century Bishop of Salisbury and saint

- Bishop of Salisbury
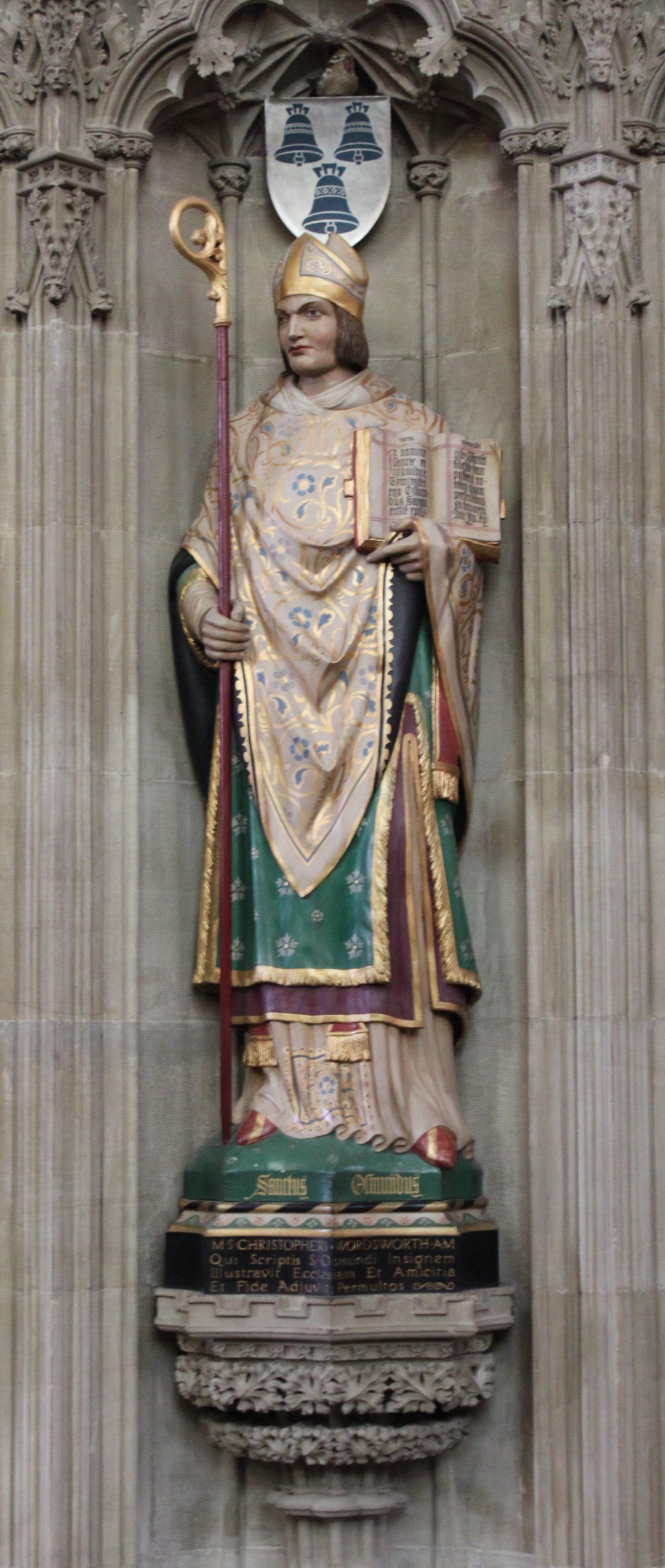
- Province: Canterbury
- Diocese: Salisbury
- Appointed: 1078
- Term ended: 3 or 4 December 1099

Orders
- Consecration: c. 3 June 1078

Personal details
- Born: Seez, Normandy
- Died: 3 or 4 December 1099 Salisbury

Sainthood
- Feast day: 16 July, 4 December
- Venerated in: Catholic Church; Church of England
- Canonized: 1 January 1457 by Callixtus III
- Patronage: insanity, mental illness, mentally ill people, paralysed people, paralysis, ruptures, toothache

Lord Chancellor
- In office 1070–1078
- Monarch: William I
- Preceded by: Herfast
- Succeeded by: Maurice
- Shrines: Salisbury Cathedral

Osmund (Note: Norman: Osmond, Latin: Osmundus) (died 3 December 1099), Count of Sées, was a Norman noble and clergyman. Following the Norman conquest of England, he served as Lord Chancellor (c. 1070–1078) and as the second bishop of Salisbury, or Old Sarum.

== Life ==
Osmund, a native of Normandy, accompanied William, Duke of Normandy to England, and was made Chancellor of the realm about 1070. He was employed in many civil transactions and was engaged as one of the Chief Commissioners for drawing up the Domesday Book.

Osmund became bishop of Salisbury by authority of Pope Gregory VII, and was consecrated by Archbishop Lanfranc around 3 June 1078. His diocese comprised the counties of Dorset, Wiltshire, and Berkshire, having absorbed the former bishoprics of Sherborne and Ramsbury under its incumbent Herman at the 1075 Council of London. In his Acts of the English Bishops, William of Malmesbury describes medieval Salisbury as a fortress rather than a city, placed on a high hill, surrounded by a massive wall. Peter of Blois later referred to the castle and church as "the ark of God shut up in the temple of Baal."

Henry I's biographer C. Warren Hollister suggests the possibility that Osmund was in part responsible for Henry's education; Henry was consistently in the bishop's company during his formative years, around 1080 to 1086.

In 1086 Osmund was present at the Great Gemot held at Old Sarum when the Domesday Book was accepted and the great landowners swore fealty to the sovereign.

Osmund died on the night of 3 December 1099, and was succeeded, after the see had been vacant for eight years, by Roger of Salisbury, a statesman and counsellor of Henry I. His remains were buried at Old Sarum, translated to New Salisbury on 23 July 1457, and deposited in the Lady Chapel, where the upper, sumptuous shrine was destroyed under Henry VIII leaving only the 12th Century Purbeck Marble base. The slab with the simple inscription mxcix has lain in various parts of the cathedral. In 1644 it was in the middle of the Lady Chapel. It is now under the easternmost arch on the south side.

== Works ==
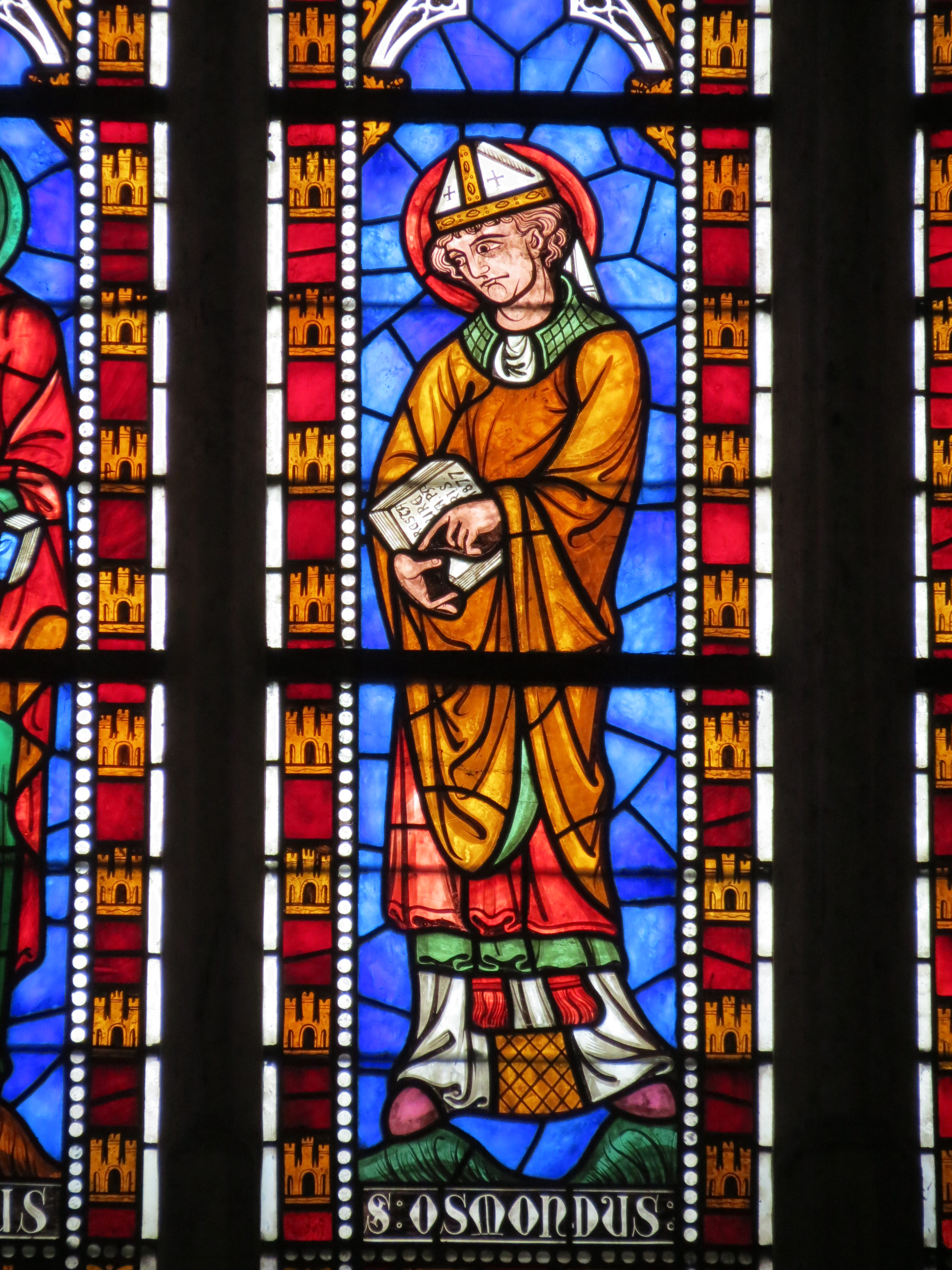
Saint Osmund

Osmund's work was threefold — first, the building of the cathedral at Old Sarum, which was consecrated on 5 April 1092.

Second was the constitution of a cathedral body. This was framed on the usual Norman model, with dean, precentor, chancellor, and treasurer, whose duties were exactly defined, some thirty-two canons, a subdean, and succentor. All save the last two were bound to a residence. These canons were "secular", each living in his own house. Their duties were to be special companions and advisers of the bishop, to carry out with fitting solemnity the full round of liturgical services and to do missionary work in the surrounding districts. There was formed a school for clergy of which the chancellor was the head. The cathedral was thoroughly constituted "the Mother Church" of the diocese. Osmund's canons were renowned for their musical talent and their zeal for learning, and had great influence on the foundation of other cathedral bodies.

Third was the formation of the "Sarum Use". Osmund made selections of the practices he saw around him and arranged the offices and services. He initiated some revisions to the extant Celtic-Anglo-Saxon rite and the local adaptations of the Roman rite, drawing on both Norman and Anglo-Saxon traditions. Given the similarities between the liturgy in Rouen and that of Sarum, it appears that the liturgical practices of Rouen in northern France likely inspired the Sarum liturgical books. Intended primarily for his own diocese, the Ordinal of Osmund, regulating the Divine Office, Mass, and Calendar, was used, within a hundred years, almost throughout England, Wales, and Ireland, and was introduced into Scotland about 1250.

The "Register of St. Osmund" is a collection of documents without any chronological arrangement, gathered together after his time, divided roughly into two parts: the "Consuetudinary" (Rolls Series, 1–185, and in Rock, vol. III, 1–110), styled "De Officiis Ecclesiasticis", and a series of documents and charters, all more or less bearing on the construction of the cathedral at Old Sarum, the foundation of the cathedral body, the treasures belonging to it, and the history of dependent churches. The existing "Consuetudinary" was taken from an older copy, re-arranged with additions and modifications and ready probably when Richard Poore consecrated the cathedral at New Salisbury in 1225. A copy, almost verbatim the same as this, was taken from the older book for the use of St. Patrick's, Dublin, which was erected into a cathedral and modelled on the church at Sarum by Henry de Loundres who was bishop from 1213 to 1228.

William of Malmesbury in summing up Osmund's character says he was "so eminent for chastity that common fame would itself blush to speak otherwise than truthfully concerning his virtue. Stern he might appear to penitents, but not more severe to them than to himself. Free from ambition, he neither imprudently wasted his own substance, nor sought the wealth of others".

Osmund gathered together a good library for his canons. A late-medieval source notes, somewhat disdainfully, that even as a bishop he would scribe, illuminate and bind books himself; by that period this was eccentric behaviour, but it was not so in 11th-century England. At one time Osmund thought Archbishop Anselm too unyielding and needlessly scrupulous in the dispute concerning investitures and in 1095 at the Council of Rockingham favoured the king. But after the Lateran Council in 1099, he boldly sided with the archbishop and the beautiful anecdote is related, showing his simple sincerity, how when Anselm was on his way to Windsor, Osmund knelt before him and received his forgiveness. He had a great reverence for St. Aldhelm who 300 years before as Bishop of Sherborne had been Osmund's predecessor. He officiated at the saint's translation to a more fitting shrine at Malmesbury and helped Lanfranc to obtain his canonization. Abbot Warin gave him a bone of the left arm of St. Aldhelm which he kept at Sarum where miracles were wrought. In 1228 the Bishop of Sarum and the canons applied to Gregory IX for Osmund's canonization but not until some 200 years afterwards on 1 January 1457, was the bull issued by Callistus III. In 1472 a special indulgence was granted by Sixtus IV for a visit to his cathedral on his festival and a convocation held in St. Paul's in 1481 fixed 4 December as the day to commemorate him. A house at Bishop Wordsworth's School is named for him. He is commemorated by a statue in niche 178 on the west front of Salisbury Cathedral.

Osmund's canonization took almost 230 years, with papal proceedings that started in 1228 not concluding until 1457.

Osmund is remembered in the Church of England with a commemoration on 16 July.

== Citations ==
Political offices
Preceded by Herfast	Lord Chancellor; 1070–1078	Succeeded by Maurice
Catholic Church titles
Preceded by Herman	Bishop of Salisbury; 1078–1099	Succeeded by Roger of Salisbury
