= Nicholas Farnham =

13th-century Bishop of Coventry-elect and Bishop of Durham

- Bishop of Durham
- Elected: 2 January 1241
- Term ended: 2 February 1249
- Predecessor: Thomas de Melsonby
- Successor: Walter of Kirkham
- Other post: Bishop of Coventry and Lichfield-elect

Orders
- Consecration: either 26 May or 9 June 1241

Personal details
- Died: 1257 Stockton manor
- Buried: Durham Cathedral
- Denomination: Catholic

Nicholas Farnham (or Nicholas of Farnham; died 1257) was a Bishop of Durham, England.

Farnham was probably a native of Farnham, Surrey. He studied at Oxford University before moving on to study at Paris and Bologna. At Paris he first studied theology, but later moved to medicine. He taught at the University of Bologna as a teacher of medicine before moving to England. He was at Paris when the riots of 1229 drove many teachers out of Paris. Farnham came to England because of King Henry III's offers of teaching chairs at Oxford to those displaced by the riots.

Farnham was a royal physician before he became confessor to the king and queen in 1237. In 1239, the cathedral chapter of Coventry elected him Bishop of Coventry, but Farnham refused the office. He was elected to the see of Durham on 2 January 1241 and at first he wanted to decline the office, but Robert Grosseteste, Bishop of Lincoln persuaded him to accept. Farnham was consecrated as bishop on either 26 May or 9 June 1241.

While bishop, Farnham continued to work for the king. In 1241 he was mediating with King Alexander II of Scotland, and in 1242 he was involved in the negotiations over the marriage of King Henry's daughter Margaret to the future Alexander III of Scotland. As a bishop, he became embroiled in a dispute with a dependency of St Alban's Priory, which was finally settled in 1248 in the priory's favour. The set of constitutions, or laws, he issued for the clergy of his diocese were heavily based on his predecessor's constitutions as well as Grosseteste's for Lincoln.

Farnham was often ill. In 1244, he almost died, and had to go to the south of England where he was said to have received a miraculous cure from drinking water which had had bristles from the beard of Saint Edmund of Abingdon soaked in it. Once more in 1248, his health declined, and it was this illness that caused Farnham to seek a licence to resign his see from the pope. He resigned on 2 February 1249 and died in 1257. On his resignation, he had three manors assigned to him for his support, and it was at one of these, Stockton in County Durham, that he died, possibly on 31 July, which was the date his death was commemorated at Durham. He was buried in Durham Cathedral.

== Citations ==
Catholic Church titles
Preceded by William de Raley	Bishop of Coventry and Lichfield elected but refused office 1239	Succeeded by William de Manchester
Preceded by Thomas de Melsonby	Bishop of Durham; 1241–1249	Succeeded by Walter of Kirkham
