= William Scot =

13th-century Bishop of Durham-elect

- Bishop of Durham-elect
- Elected: before 20 October 1226
- Quashed: 19 May 1227
- Predecessor: Richard Marsh
- Successor: Richard Poore
- Other post: Archdeacon of Worcester

Personal details
- Died: c. 1243
- Denomination: Catholic

William Scot (or William of Stitchill; died c. 1243) was a medieval Bishop of Durham-elect.

Scot was Archdeacon of Worcester in December 1218. He was elected to the see of Durham before 20 October 1226 but the election was quashed by Pope Gregory IX on 19 May 1227. He died about 1242 or 1243.

Scot may have been the father of Robert Stitchill, who was Bishop of Durham from 1260 to 1274.

== Citations ==
Catholic Church titles
Preceded by Richard Marsh	Bishop of Durham; Election quashed 1226–1227	Succeeded by Richard Poore
