= Old Sarum Castle =

Motte-and-bailey castle in Salisbury, Wiltshire, England

- Wiltshire, England
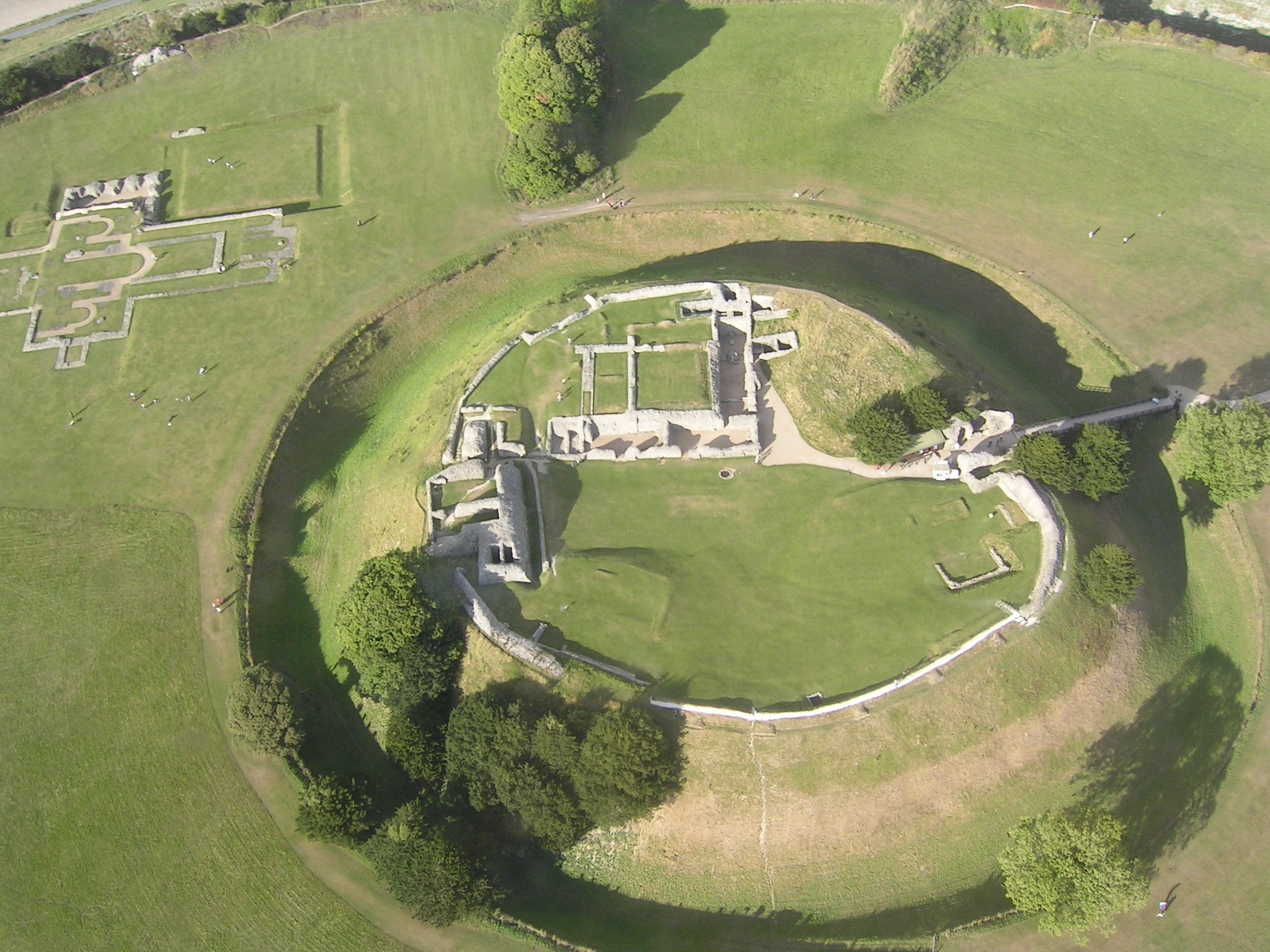
- Old Sarum Castle (foreground), with Old Sarum Cathedral in the background at left

Site information
- Type: Castle
- Owner: English Heritage
- Open to the public: Yes
- Condition: Ruined

Location
- Shown within Wiltshire
- Location within Wiltshire
- Coordinates: 51.0931°N 1.8000°W
- Grid reference: SO716927

Site history
- In use: 1069–1322

Old Sarum Castle, formerly known as Seresberi Castle, is an 11th century motte-and-bailey castle built in Old Sarum, Wiltshire. It was originally built in timber and it was eventually built in stone, of which the ruins can be seen today. Only the mound and foundations of the castle survive today. The castle is owned by the English Heritage and it is open to the public, along with the rest of Old Sarum.

== History ==
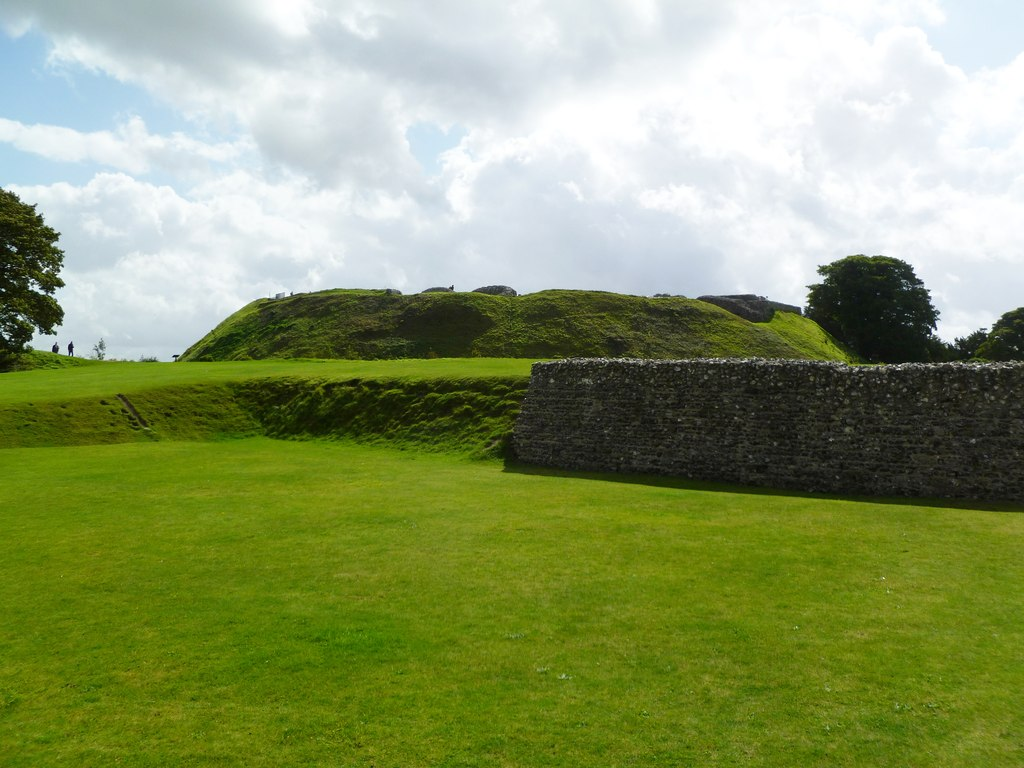
Motte of Old Sarum Castle

In 1069, after recognising the defensive qualities of Seresberi, now known as Old Sarum, William the Conqueror built a motte-and-bailey castle within an older Iron Age hillfort known as Sorviodunum, constructed around 400 BC. The courtyard was added around 1100 by Bishop Roger and he also began work on a royal palace during the 1130s, prior to his arrest by Henry's successor Stephen. and directed the royal administration and exchequer along with his extended family. This palace was long thought to have been the small structure whose ruins are located in the small central bailey; it may, however, have been the large palace recently discovered in the southeast quadrant of the outer bailey. This palace was 170 m × 65 m (560 ft × 210 ft), surrounded a large central courtyard, and had walls up to 3 m (10 ft) thick. A 60-metre-long (200 ft) room was probably a great hall and there seems to have been a large tower. At the time of Roger's arrest by King Stephen, the bishop administered the castle on the king's behalf; it was thereafter allowed to fall into disrepair, but the sheriff and castellan continued to administer the area under the king's authority.

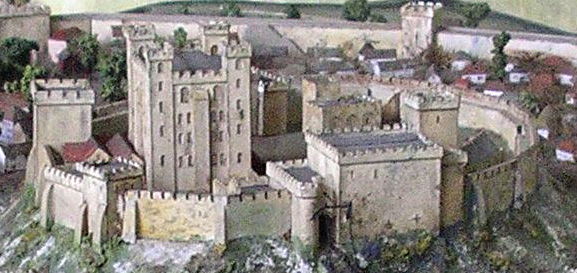
1927 model of Old Sarum Castle as it looked during the 12th century (model housed in Salisbury Cathedral)

In 1171, King Henry II ordered that improvements be made to Old Sarum, including a new gatehouse, drawbridge, inner bailey walls and a treasury to be constructed within the keep of the castle; this work continued until 1189. In addition, a refurbishment was undertaken of the quarters of Eleanor of Aquitaine, who was under house arrest at Old Sarum until 1189. After these repairs and maintenance works, a new hall, kitchen, and bakehouse for the sheriff of Wiltshire were begun about 1201 and completed by 1215. After most of the population of Old Sarum had relocated to Salisbury by 1220, the castle became unused and was in decay by 1240. It was later repaired, only to be demolished by King Edward III in 1322.

Around 1350, Edward III ordered £700 to be spent on repairs and maintenance of the castle at Old Sarum, but an additional £600 required to repair the keep was never spent, and the state of the castle started to deteriorate over time. The castle grounds were sold by Henry VIII in 1514.

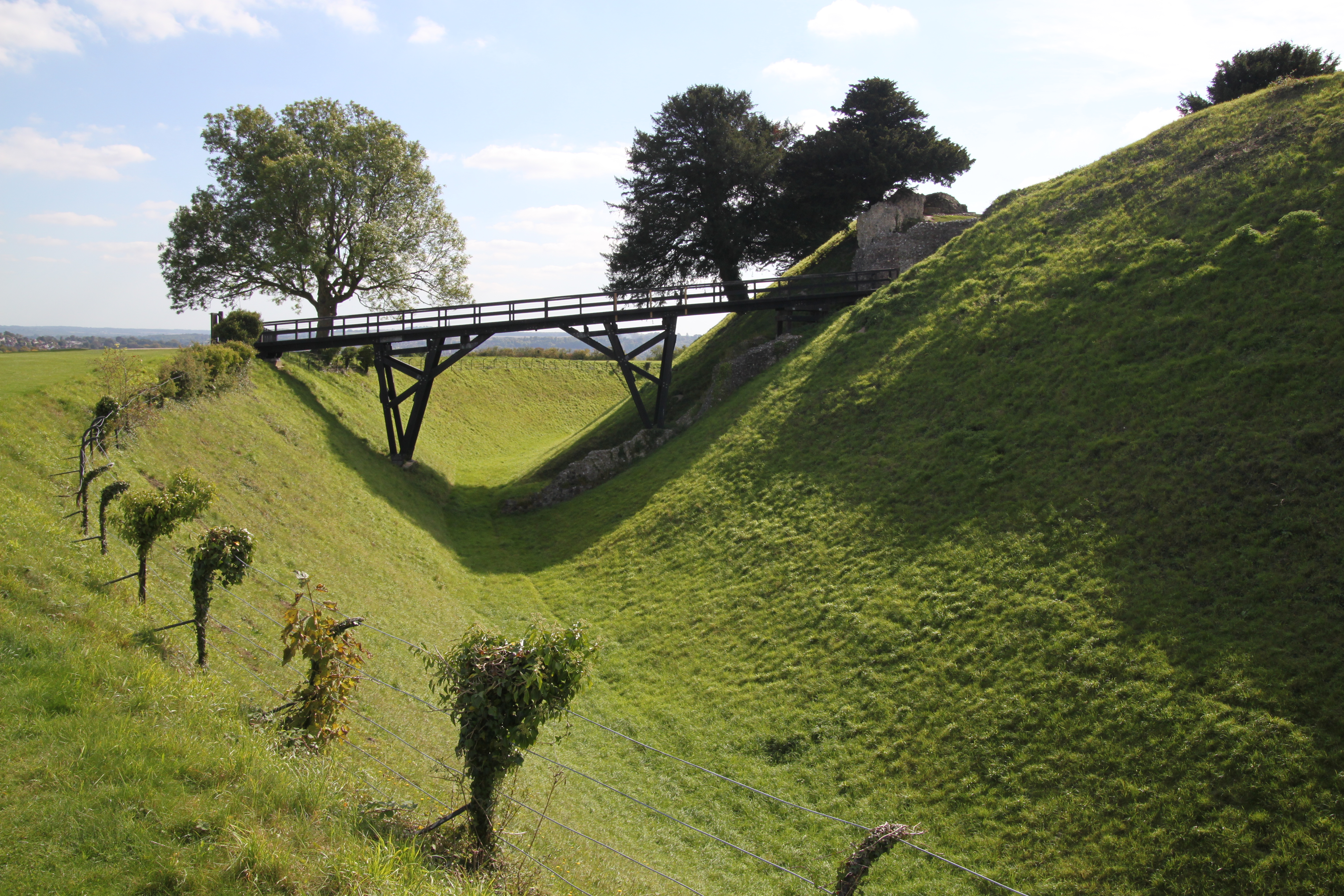
Motte and ditch of Old Sarum Castle

The site of the castle and Old Sarum Cathedral ruins at Old Sarum are considered a highly important ancient monument: it was among the 26 English locations scheduled by the 1882 Ancient Monuments Protection Act, the first such British legislation. That protection has subsequently continued, expanding to include some suburban areas west and south-east of the outer bailey. In 1972, Old Sarum was also listed as a Grade I structure. Old Sarum Castle, along with the cathedral ruins, is now administered by English Heritage. Its paved car park and grass overflow parking area are in the eastern area of the outer bailey.
