= Robert of Holy Island =

13th-century Bishop of Durham

- Bishop of Durham
- Elected: 24 September 1274
- Term ended: 7 June 1283
- Predecessor: Robert Stitchill
- Successor: Antony Bek

Orders
- Consecration: 9 December 1274

Personal details
- Died: 7 June 1283 Bishop Middleham
- Buried: 10 June 1283; Durham Cathedral in the chapter house
- Denomination: Catholic

Robert of Holy Island (or Robert de Insula; died 1283) was a medieval Bishop of Durham.

Robert was the son of crofters and was a native of the island of Lindisfarne. He had a brother, Henry, who became Robert's executor. He became a Benedictine monk at Durham, where he served as sacrist from 1265 to 1269. He was prior of Durham's dependent monastic cell at Finchale Priory by 1272. Robert was sent as a representative of the Durham cathedral chapter to the Second Council of Lyon in 1274. He was elected to the see of Durham on 24 September 1274. He was consecrated on 9 December 1274 at York.

While Robert was bishop, in 1281 the Archbishop of York, William Wickwane, declared that he was going to inspect the cathedral chapter at Durham. The monks claimed an exemption from oversight by the archbishops of York and were supported by Robert as bishop. When the archbishop attempted to enter the cathedral chapter in June 1281, he found the doors shut and locked. Both sides sued each other and the resulting litigation dragged on for years. In fact, it was never technically resolved and is one of the longest law cases on record.

Robert died on 7 June 1283 at Bishop Middleham. He was buried in the chapter house at Durham Cathedral on 10 June 1283. In the 19th century, a grave identified as his was excavated in the chapter house.

== Citations ==
Catholic Church titles
Preceded by Robert Stitchill	Bishop of Durham; 1274–1283	Succeeded by Antony Bek
