= Thomas de Melsonby =

13th-century Bishop of Durham

Thomas of Melsonby
- Bishop of Durham
- Elected: 1 June 1237
- Term ended: resigned after 1237
- Predecessor: Richard le Poor
- Successor: Nicholas Farnham
- Other post: Prior of Durham

Personal details
- Died: after 1244
- Denomination: Catholic

Thomas de Melsonby (died after 1244) was a medieval Bishop of Durham-elect and Prior of Durham.

Melsonby was the son of the rector of Melsonby. He was prior of a cell at Coldingham before being elected prior of Durham Cathedral in about 1233. He was elected to the see of Durham on 1 June 1237 but King Henry III of England objected. After lawsuits, Melsonby resigned the bishopric. He remained prior until 1244 when he resigned that office. He died sometime after 1244.

== Citations ==
Catholic Church titles
Preceded by Radulf Kerneth	Prior of Durham; 1234–1244	Succeeded by Betram de Middleton
Preceded by Richard le Poor	Bishop of Durham resigned see 1237–1241	Succeeded by Nicholas Farnham
