= Herman (bishop of Salisbury) =

11th-century Bishop of Sherborne, Bishop of Ramsbury, and Bishop of Salisbury

- Bishop of Salisbury
- Province: Canterbury
- Appointed: 1075
- Term ended: 20 February 1078
- Successor: Osmund
- Previous posts: Bishop of Ramsbury; Bishop of Sherborne

Orders
- Consecration: c. 1045

Personal details
- Died: 20 February 1078
- Denomination: Catholic Church

Herman (Note: Or Hereman; Latin: Hermannus or Herimannus) (died 1078) was a medieval cleric who served as the Bishop of Ramsbury and of Sherborne before and after the Norman conquest of England. In 1075, he oversaw their unification and translation to Salisbury (then at Old Sarum). (Note: He was sometimes called the "Bishop of Wiltshire".) He died before the completion of the new cathedral.

Herman was a native of Flanders (Lotharingia). As chaplain of Edward the Confessor, he was named Bishop of Ramsbury shortly after 22 April 1045. He visited Rome in 1050, where he attended a papal council with his fellow English bishop Ealdred. He was named abbot of Malmesbury Abbey by King Edward in 1055 and planned to move his seat there as well, apparently in the hope of increasing the income from his poor see. The king revoked this position after three days, however, when the monks and Earl Harold objected.

Herman then abandoned Ramsbury to the administration of Ealdred and traveled to the continent to become a monk at the abbey of St Bertin at Saint-Omer. He returned three years later when the bishopric of Sherborne fell vacant; he was elected, faced no opposition from Earl Harold, and resumed administration of Ramsbury around 1058 or 1059. He later moved the see to the royal fortress at Salisbury. Approval for this translation and the unification of his sees was given at the council held at London between 1074 and 1075.

Herman was a patron of Goscelin of Saint-Bertin, a noted medieval historian and musician.

Herman died on 20 February 1078.

== Citations ==
Catholic Church titles
Preceded by Bertwald (bishop)	Bishop of Ramsbury; 1045–1055	Succeeded by Ealdred (administrator)
Preceded by Ealdred (administrator)	Bishop of Ramsbury; 1058–1075	United and translated to Salisbury
Preceded by Ælfwold II	Bishop of Sherborne; 1058–1075	United and translated to Salisbury
New title	Bishop of Salisbury; 1075–1078	Succeeded by Osmund
