= Richard of Ilchester =

12th-century Bishop of Winchester

- Bishop of Winchester
- Elected: 1 May 1173
- Term ended: 22 December 1188
- Predecessor: Henry of Blois
- Successor: Godfrey de Lucy
- Previous post: Archdeacon of Poitiers

Orders
- Consecration: October 1174

Personal details
- Died: 22 December 1188
- Denomination: Catholic

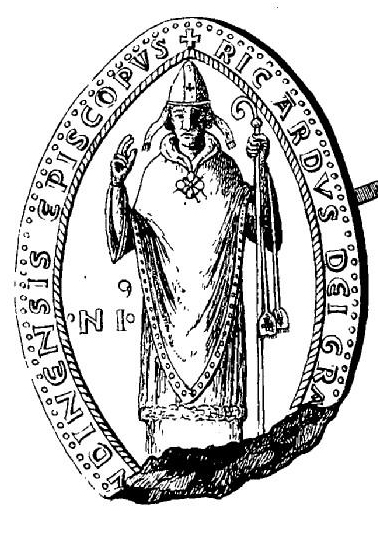
Medieval depiction of Richard of Ilchester

Richard of Ilchester (Note: Also called Richard of Toclyve or Richard of Toclive) (died 22 December 1188) was a medieval English statesman and prelate.

== Life ==
Richard was born in the diocese of Bath, where he obtained preferment. Early in the reign of Henry II, however, he is found acting as a clerk in the King's court, probably under Thomas Becket. He was one of the officials who assisted Henry in carrying out his great judicial and financial reforms. In 1154, Richard was the first King's Remembrancer, the oldest judicial office still in existence in England.

In 1162, or 1163, Richard was appointed archdeacon of Poitiers, but he spent most of his time in England. However, in the next two or three years he visited Pope Alexander III and the Emperor Frederick I in the interests of the English King. He was one of the persons to whom the Constitutions of Clarendon were addressed, along with Geoffrey Ridel and Richard de Luci. Becket excommunicated him for promising to support Frederick against Alexander in 1166. Before this event, however, Richard had been appointed a baron of the exchequer. One of Richard's duties was to oversee the making of the Pipe rolls, as well as keeping the treasurer from falling asleep. He was also responsible for an innovation in record keeping by the Exchequer, ordering a record of every summons made by the Exchequer. This system, however, was discontinued later.

Although immersed in secular business, Richard received several rich ecclesiastical offices, including treasurer of the diocese of Poitiers, and on 1 May 1173 he was elected bishop of Winchester, being consecrated at Canterbury in October 1174. Richard continued to serve Henry II. In 1176 he was appointed justiciary and seneschal of Normandy, and was given full control of all the royal business in the duchy. He died on 22 December 1188, and was buried in Winchester Cathedral. Richard owes his surname to Henry II, who grants him a mill at Ilchester.

Bishop Richard gave an endowment to a hospital in Winchester and allowed it to double the number of poor people it fed.

Richard probably was the father of the brothers Richard Poore, who became Bishop of Durham, and Herbert Poore, who became Bishop of Salisbury.

== Citations ==
Catholic Church titles
Preceded by Henry of Blois	Bishop of Winchester; 1173–1188	Succeeded by Godfrey de Luci
