= List of papal legates to England =

This is a list of papal legates sent by the Holy See to England. The legature was suppressed under Henry VIII in 1536, and restored shortly under his daughter Mary I (reigned from 1553 to 1558) and King James II of England (from 1686 to 1688).

== Legates, 1066–1558 ==
- 1070 - Hubert, signatory of the Accord of Winchester
- 1095 - Walter of Albano
- 1101- Guy, Archbishop of Vienna (Later Pope Callixtus II)
- 1115–1120? - Anselm of St Saba
- 1125 - John of Crema
- 1126–1130 - William de Corbeil
- 1132–1136 - William of Corbeil
- 1138–1139 - Alberic of Ostia
- 1139–1143 - Henry of Blois, Bishop of Winchester
- 1149-1159 - Theobald of Bec, Archbishop of Canterbury
- 1166- ? - Thomas Becket, Archbishop of Canterbury
- 1190 - William Longchamp
- 1213 - Niccolò de Romanis, Bishop of Tusculum
- 1213–1216 - Pandulf Verraccio, later Bishop of Norwich (as legatus missus/nuncio)
- 1216–1218 - Guala Bicchieri
- 1218–1221 - Pandulf Verraccio, later Bishop of Norwich
- 1237/1240 - Otto of Tonengo
- 1265–1268 - Ottobuono Fieschi, later Pope Adrian V
- ...
- 1518–1530 - Thomas Wolsey
- 1536–1553 : no relations
- 1553–1557 - Reginald Pole
- 1557–1558 - William Petow
- 1570–1686 : no relations
- 1686–1688 : Ferdinando d'Adda
- 1688–1914 : no relations

== See also ==
- Apostolic Nunciature to Great Britain
