= Richard Marsh (bishop) =

13th-century Chancellor of England and Bishop of Durham

- Bishop of Durham
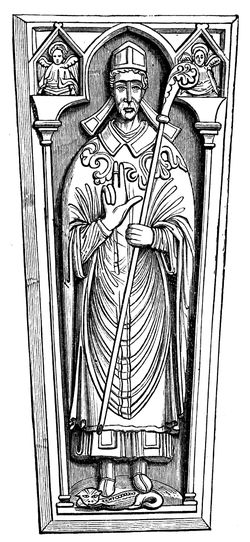
- Bishop Marshall of Exeter, died 1206; from his tomb at Exeter, showing a bishop vested for mass.
- Elected: c. 27 June 1217
- Predecessor: Morgan
- Successor: William Scot
- Other post: Archdeacon of Northumberland

Orders
- Consecration: probably 2 July 1217 by Walter de Gray

Personal details
- Died: 1 May 1226 Peterborough Abbey
- Denomination: Catholic

Lord Chancellor
- In office 1214–1226
- Monarchs: John of England, Henry III of England
- Preceded by: Walter de Gray
- Succeeded by: Ralph Neville

Richard Marsh (died 1 May 1226), also called Richard de Marisco, served as Lord Chancellor of England and Bishop of Durham.

== Early career ==
Marsh attended a university, as he was styled magister, but which university it was is unknown. His ancestry and upbringing likewise are unknown. He was a royal clerk and canon of Exeter Cathedral before becoming Archdeacon of Northumberland by 1 November 1211. He was also Archdeacon of Richmond. During that time he was also serving in the financial administration. In 1210, he earned a mention as one of the king's "evil counsellors."

== Royal service ==
During 1212 Marsh held the office of Sheriff of Somerset and Dorset. Stephen Langton, the Archbishop of Canterbury, threatened Marsh with excommunication over Marsh's exactions from the Church during the interdict of John's reign. Marsh went to Rome in 1213 to negotiate on both his own behalf and on his king's behalf, and succeeded in getting much more lenient terms from the pope than had originally been given. He served as Chancellor from 29 October 1214 until his death in 1226. However, his title was mostly honorary after his election as a bishop in 1217, for he no longer attended court all the time, and Ralph Neville, who had custody of the king's seal, did most of the actual work of the office of chancellor.

== Bishop ==
Marsh was elected Bishop of Durham about 27 June 1217 and consecrated probably on 2 July 1217. His election had been promoted by the papal legate, Guala Bicchieri, and his consecration was performed by Archbishop Walter de Gray of York at Gloucester.

In 1224, when Fawkes de Breauté kidnapped a royal justice and held him in Bedford Castle, Marsh voluntarily contributed to the carucage that had been voted by the clergy of the ecclesiastical province of Canterbury, even though he was a member of the province of York. This carucage was voted to help with the expenses of the siege and taking of Bedford Castle. Marsh continued the quarrel between the cathedral chapter and the bishops over the revenues and rights of the monks.

== Death and legacy ==
Marsh died on 1 May 1226, quite suddenly at Peterborough Abbey while on his way to London for a hearing in the lawsuit between the monks and himself. His nephew, Adam Marsh, was his heir, and received his large library as a bequest.

== Citations ==
Political offices
Preceded by Walter de Gray	Lord Chancellor; 1214–1226	Succeeded by Ralph Neville
Catholic Church titles
Preceded by Morgan	Bishop of Durham; 1217–1226	Succeeded by William Scot
