= Bertwald of Ramsbury =

11th-century bishop of Ramsbury

Bertwald
- Bishop of Ramsbury
- Appointed: 1005
- Term ended: 22 April 1045
- Predecessor: Aelfric
- Successor: Herman

Personal details
- Died: 22 April 1045
- Denomination: Christian

Bertwald of Ramsbury (Note: Otherwise Britwold of Glastonbury and sometimes Beorhtwald) was an 11th-century Bishop of Ramsbury and saint.

== Life ==
Bertwald became a monk at Glastonbury Abbey and was appointed Bishop of Ramsbury in 1005. He is mostly known from the witness lists of King Cnut's charters which show he was in high favour with the Danish monarch. He died on 22 April 1045 and was buried at Glastonbury.

== Citations ==
Christian titles
Preceded by Aelfric	Bishop of Ramsbury; 995–1045	Succeeded by Herman
