= Papal legate =

Personal representative of the Pope

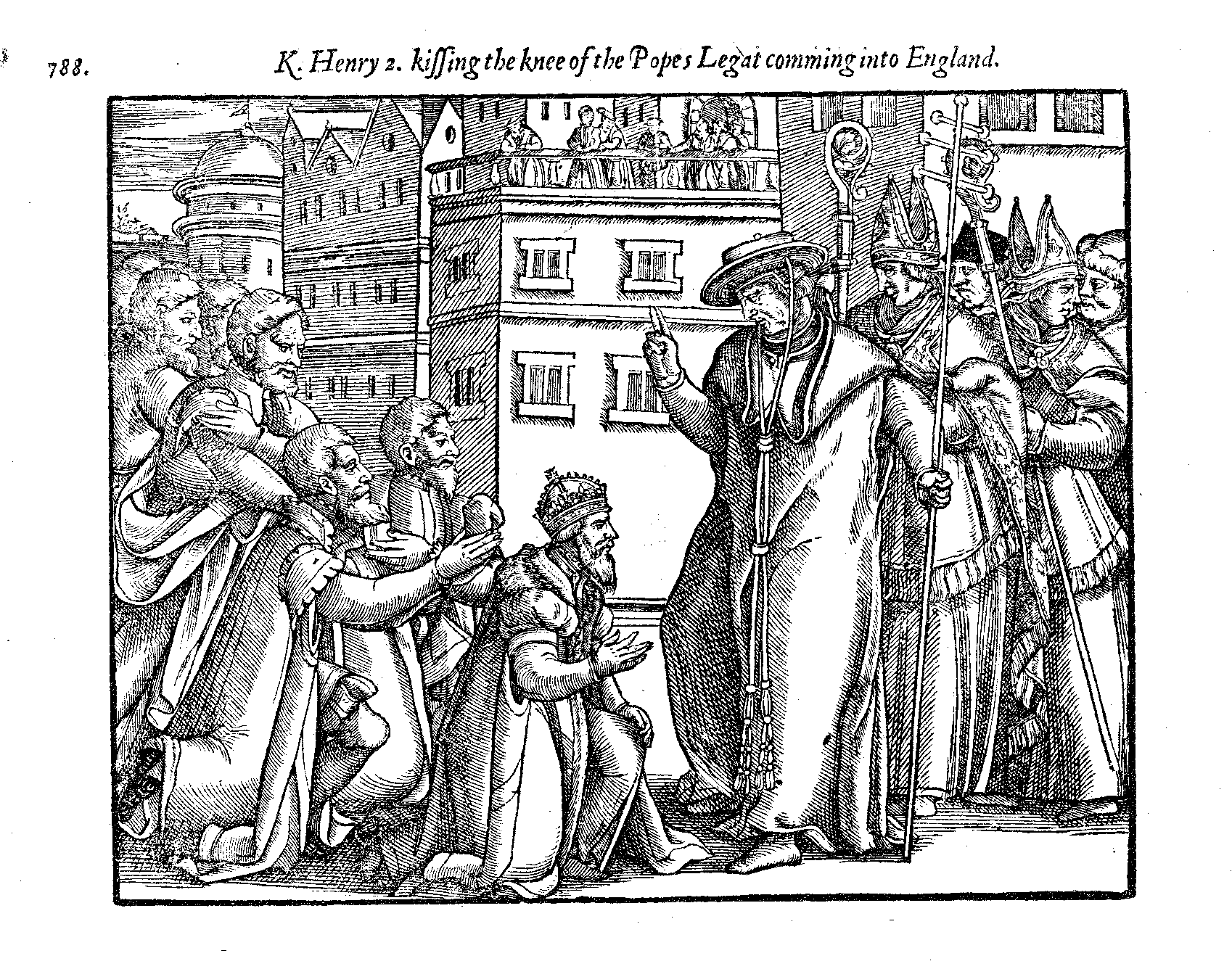
A woodcut showing Henry II of England greeting the Pope's legate.

A papal legate or apostolic legate (from the ancient Roman title legatus) is a personal representative of the Pope to foreign nations, to some other part of the Catholic Church, or to representatives of a state or monarchy. A legate is empowered in matters of Catholic faith and for the settlement of ecclesiastical matters.

The legate is appointed directly by the Pope, the Bishop of Rome and head of the Catholic Church. Hence a legate is usually sent to a government, to a sovereign, to a large body of believers (such as a national church), or to take charge of a major religious effort, such as an ecumenical council, a crusade to the Holy Land, or even against a heresy such as the Cathars.

The term legation is applied both to a legate's mandate and to the territory concerned (such as a state, or an ecclesiastical province). The relevant adjective is legatine.

== History ==
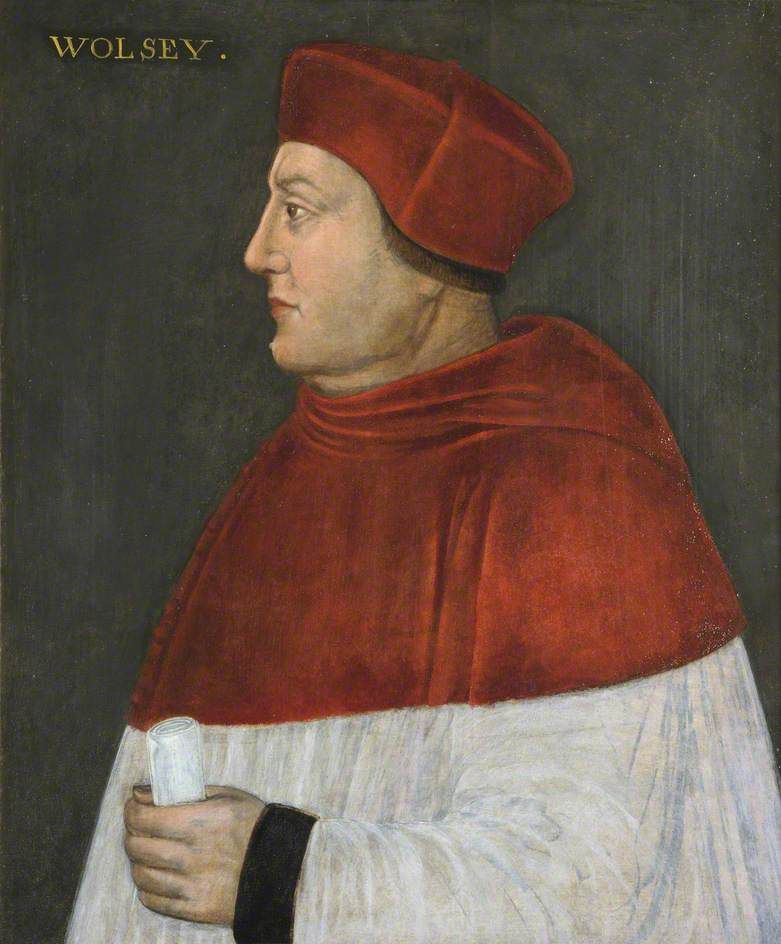
Cardinal Thomas Wolsey, papal legate to England during the reign of Henry VIII

In the High Middle Ages, papal legates were often used to strengthen the links between Rome and the many parts of Christendom. More often than not, legates were learned men and skilled diplomats who were not from the country they were accredited to. For example, the Italian-born Guala Bicchieri served as papal legate to England in the early 13th century and played a major role in both the English government and church at the time. By the Late Middle Ages it had become more common to appoint native clerics to the position of legate within their own country, such as Cardinal Wolsey acting as legate to the court of Henry VIII of England. The reason for this switch in policy could be attributed to a change in attitude on the eve of the Reformation; by this point, foreign men representing the papacy would be more likely to reinforce dissent than bring Christendom closer together.

Papal legates often summoned legatine councils, which dealt with church government and other ecclesiastical issues. According to Pope Gregory VII, writing in the Dictatus papae, a papal legate "presides over all bishops in a council, even if he is inferior in rank, and he can pronounce sentence of deposition against them". During the Middle Ages, a legatine council was the usual means that a papal legate imposed his directives.

The Second Vatican Council recognised that, in clarifying and updating the pastoral role of the bishops in the church, the role played by papal legates also needed to be revised.

== Diplomatic ranks ==
There are several ranks of papal legates in diplomacy, some of which are no longer used.

=== Apostolic nuncio ===
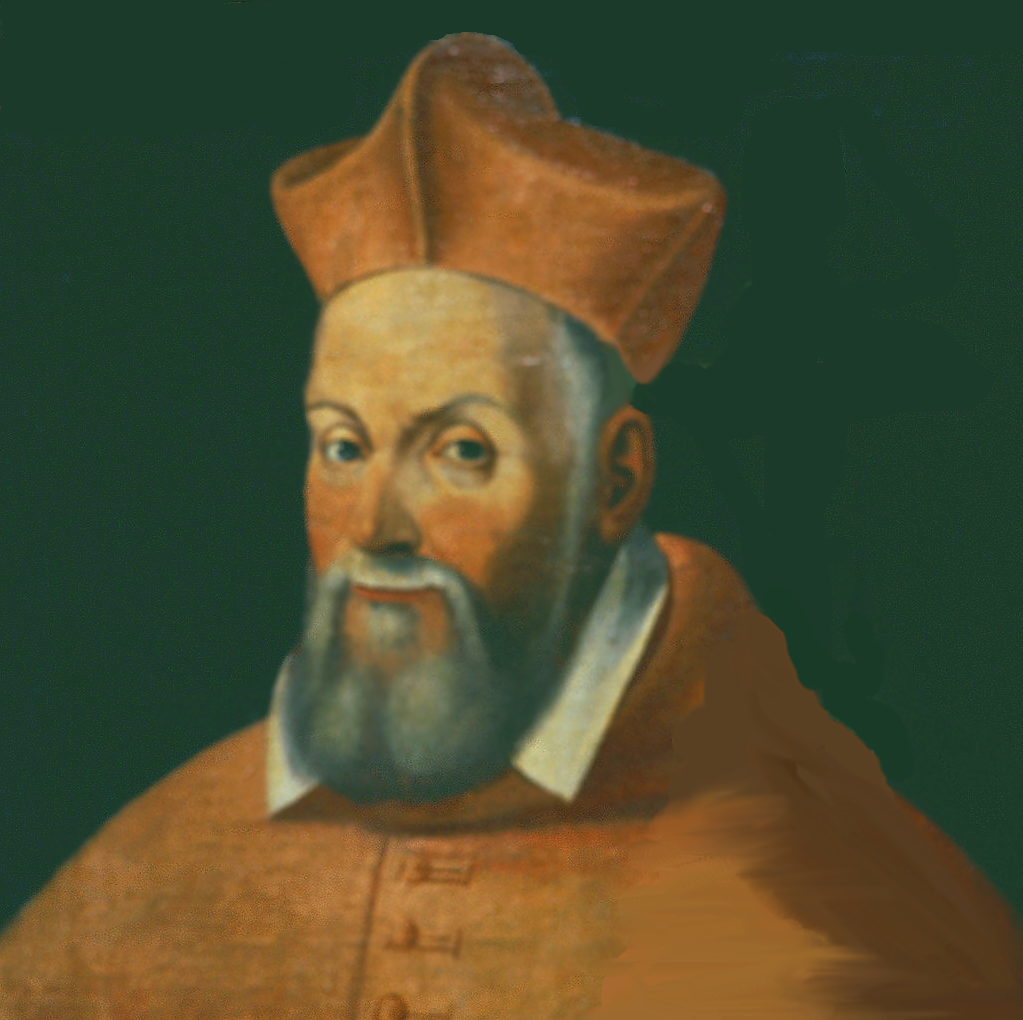
Cardinal Giovanni Francesco Commendone, sometime papal nuncio to Urbino, Ferrara, Venice, Parma, and England.

The most common form of papal legate today is the apostolic nuncio, whose task it is to strengthen relations between the Holy See and the Catholic Church in a particular country and at the same time to act as the diplomatic representative of the Holy See to the government of that country. An apostolic nuncio is generally equivalent in rank to that of ambassador extraordinary and plenipotentiary, although in Catholic countries the nuncio often ranks above ambassadors in diplomatic protocol. A nuncio performs the same functions as an ambassador and has the same diplomatic privileges. Under the 1961 Vienna Convention on Diplomatic Relations, to which the Holy See is a party, a nuncio is an ambassador like those from any other country. The Vienna Convention allows the host state to grant seniority of precedence to the nuncio over others of ambassadorial rank accredited to the same country, and may grant the deanship of that country's diplomatic corps to the nuncio regardless of seniority.

==== Pro-nuncio ====
Pro-nuncio was a term used from 1965 to 1991 for a papal diplomatic representative of full ambassadorial rank accredited to a country that did not accord him precedence over other ambassadors and ex officio deanship of the diplomatic corps. In those countries, the papal representative's precedence within the corps is exactly on a par with that of the other members of ambassadorial rank, so that he becomes dean only on becoming the senior member of the corps.

==== Apostolic delegate ====
For countries with which the Holy See has no diplomatic relations, an apostolic delegate is sent to serve as a liaison with the Catholic Church in that country, though not accredited to its government.

=== Legati ===
==== Legatus a latere ====
This highest rank (literally "from the (pope's) side", i.e. "intimately" trusted) is normally awarded to a priest of cardinal rank. It is an exceptional investiture and can either be focused or broad in scope. The legate a latere is the alter ego of the Pope, and as such, possesses full plenipotentiary powers.

==== Legatus natus ====
Literally "born legate", i.e. not nominated individually but ex officio, namely a bishop holding this rank as a privilege of his see, e.g. archbishops of Canterbury (pre-Reformation), Prague, Esztergom, Udine, Salzburg, Gniezno and Cologne. The legatus natus would act as the Pope's representative in his province, with a legatus a latere only being sent in extraordinary circumstances. Although limited in their jurisdiction compared to legati a latere, a legatus natus was not subordinate to them.

==== Legatus missus ====
Literally "sent legate", possessing limited powers for the purpose of completing a specific mission. This commission is normally focused in scope and of short duration.

== Gubernatorial legates ==
Some administrative (temporal) provinces of the Papal States in (mostly central) Italy were governed by a papal legate. This has been the case in Benevento, in Pontecorvo (of Campagna e Marittima/of Frosinone) and in Viterbo. In four cases, including Bologna, this post was awarded exclusively to cardinals; the Velletri post was created for Bartolomeo Pacca.

The title could be changed to Apostolic Delegate, as happened in Frosinone (for Pontecorvo) in 1827.

== See also ==
- Internuncio – a lower rank than Nuncio for a papal diplomatic representative, a title historically used at a time when states sent to some less important countries diplomatic representatives, called Envoys or Ministers, lower in rank than Ambassadors.
- List of papal legates to England
- Papal apocrisiarius
- Pontifical legate
