= Council of London in 1075 =

11th-century church council in Medieval England

The Council of London in 1075 was a council of the Catholic Church in England held by the new Norman archbishop of Canterbury Lanfranc five years after his installation. Other attendees included Gisa, Bishop of Wells and William the Norman (Bishop of London). The Council of London produced several decrees, these were known as the "Canons of the Council of London AD 1075".

A number of copies of the acts of the council survive, which derive from two earlier copies, one from Canterbury and one from Worcester.

The following "Canons of the Council of London AD 1075", translated from the original Latin, are taken from the old register of the church at Worcester, the original document has a short historical preface followed by the nine canons and then a section with signatures of the two archbishops, twelve bishops, and twenty-one abbots, these were preceded by the Archdeacon of Canterbury.

== Canons of the Council of London AD 1075 ==
The original text was in Latin. The following is an English translation:

Letter 11 Council of London 25 Dec. 1074-28 Aug. 1075

In the year of our Lord 1075, in the ninth year of the reign of William, glorious king of the English, a council of the whole land of England was assembled in the church of St. Paul the Apostle in London, namely of bishops, abbots and many ecclesiastics. The council was summoned and presided over by Lanfranc, archbishop of the holy church of Canterbury and primate of the whole island of Britain; the venerable men sitting with him were Thomas, archbishop of York, William, bishop of London, Geoffrey of Coutances, who though an overseas bishop was sitting with the others in the council because he had a great deal of property in England, Walchelin of Winchester, Hermann of Sherborne, Wulfstan of Worcester, Walter of Hereford, Giso of Wells, Remigius of Dorchester or Lincoln, Herfast of Elmham or Norwich, Stigand of Selsey, Osbern of Exeter, Peter of Lichfield. At that time the church of Rochester lacked a pastor. The bishop of Lindisfarne, that is Durham, for a canonically valid reason was unable to be present at the council.

1. [The first canon decreed where the bishops should all sit. They decided that the Archbishop of York ought to sit at the right hand of Archbishop of Canterbury and the Bishop of London on the left, then the Bishop of Winchester should sit next to the Archbishop of York. However, if the Archbishop of York was away then the Bishop of London should then sit on the right of York and Winchester on the left.] Because Councils had fallen out of fashion in England for many years past, some things were renewed which are known to have been defined by ancient canons too. So it was ordained according to the fourth Council of Toledo, and those of Milevis and Braga, that bishops should sit according to the time of their ordination, save those who by old custom, or by the privileges of their Churches, have seats by precedence. The old men were asked about this, what they had seen themselves or had received truly and probably from their elders, and for this answer delay was requested and granted till next day. So on the next day they stated unanimously that the Archbishop of York ought to sit at the right hand of Canterbury, the Bishop of London at the left, Winchester next York, but if York be away, London on the right, Winchester on the left.
2. Monks should conform to the rule of St. Benedict. That children and young people should have guardianship in all places and fit masters assigned them. Everyone should carry lights by night unless they have no property allowed by the authorities. If a person dies who is not allowed to have property by the authorities, but on their death is found to have property then let not the bells be tolled for him, nor the saving sacrifice be offered for his absolution, nor let him be buried in the cemetery.
3. By the decrees of Popes Damasus and Leo, and by the Councils of Sardica and Laodicea, whereby it is forbidden that bishops' sees should be in vills it was to towns, granted by royal favour and the Council's authority to the aforesaid three bishops to migrate from vills to cities - Hermann from Sherborne to Salisbury, Stigand from Selsey to Chichester, Peter from Lichfield to Chester. The case of some others who were in vills or hamlets, was postponed for the king's hearing, when he returned from a war overseas. (Note: After the conquest of England, William spent about four-fifths of his time in Normandy or France.)
4. By many decrees of the Roman pontiffs and different authorities of the sacred canons, that no one should keep or ordain any clerk or monk without letters dimissory (Note: Letters given by a bishop dismissing a person who is removing into another diocese, and recommending him for reception there.)
5. To restrain the arrogance of some unwise men it was decided by general decree that no one speak in the Council, save bishops and abbots, without leave from the metropolitan.
6. By the decrees of Gregory the Great and the Less that none take a wife from his own family or that of his deceased wife, or any be has as relation within the seventh degree on either side.
7. That no one should buy, or sell sacred orders or church office to the cure of souls because this crime was originally, condemned by the Peter the Apostle in the case of Simon Magus and afterwards forbidden under threat of excommunication by the holy fathers. (Note: The crime of buying or selling sacred orders was named simony, after Simon Magus)
8. Bones or dead animals should not be hung up anywhere to avoid disease. Sooth saying, divination, or any such works of the Devil should not be practised as all such things the sacred canons have forbidden, and those who practise them will be excommunicated.
9. That by the Councils of Elvira and Toledo XI no bishop or abbot or any of the clergy should judge a man to be put to death or to mutilation, nor favour with his authority those who so judge.

[There followed a list of the signatories, these were two archbishops, twelve bishops, and twenty-one abbots. The last abbots signature was preceded by that of the archdeacon of Canterbury]
