= Hugh de Cressy =

12th-century Anglo-Norman royal justice

- Died: 1189
- Occupation: Royal justice
- Spouse: Margaret de Chesney
- Children: Roger de Cressy
- Parent(s): Roger; Eustacia

Hugh de Cressy (Note: Sometimes Hugo de Creissi, Hugh de Creissi, or Hugh de Cressi) (died 1189) was an Anglo-Norman administrator and nobleman. Little is known of his ancestry and he first served two brothers of King Henry II of England before becoming a royal official. He was rewarded with a marriage to an heiress for his service to the king. In England he often served as a royal justice and witnessed documents, which showed his closeness to the king. On the continent, he recruited mercenaries for the royal army and was named constable of the castle of Rouen in the royal lands in France. He died in 1189 after giving lands to various monasteries before his death.

== Background and early life ==
Hugh's family was from Cressy, in Normandy, and his parents were named Roger and Eustacia. Nothing further is known about his parents, but he had a brother, Berengar, who married Isabel of Gressenhall, daughter of Wimar the Sewer. Hugh served William fitzEmpress, the brother of King Henry II of England, from the mid 1150s. William gave Hugh the manor of Harrietsham in Kent.

After William's death in 1164, Hugh passed into royal service, while also serving as seneschal to the new Earl of Surrey, Hamelin, the illegitimate half-brother of King Henry II. On the Cartae Baronum in 1166 he held one knight's fee in the barony of Giffard. In 1167 Hugh paid a fine that is recorded in the pipe rolls for the custody of his nephew's lands at Tickhill. In 1170, he was present at the coronation of Henry the Young King in June at Westminster Abbey, when Henry II had his heir crowned as a king during the elder Henry's lifetime. During the Revolt of 1173–74 by King Henry's sons, Hugh was a partisan of the king. The revolt was brought about by the desire of Henry's three oldest sons to gain some power during Henry's reign, and by mid 1174 the revolt had been defeated by the king. During the Revolt, Hugh fought at the Battle of Fornham near Fornham St Martin in Suffolk, a victory for royalist forces, but otherwise took little part in the revolt's suppression.

== Royal service ==
Hugh was close to King Henry II, witnessing a large number of royal charters and serving as a royal justice. In 1175 along with Ranulf de Glanville, Hugh served as a royal justice in northern England. He also took part of the great eyre of 1176 that was commanded after the Council of Northampton. Also in 1176, Henry II summoned Roger as a Serjeant-at-law, one of the first identifiable members of that order in the historical record. (Note: The others summoned by Henry were: 1168: Reginald de Warenne 1174: John de Cumin, William fitzRalph, and William fitzStephen 1176: William Basset and Roger fitzReinfrid 1179: Hugh de Gaerst, Ranulf de Glanvill, and Hugh Murdac 1182: William de Auberville and Osbert fitzHervey 1184: Ralph fitzStephen.) During the last 10 years of Henry's reign, Hugh witnessed 15 royal charters. (Note: Only three men witnessed more charters in this period – Ranulf de Glanville witnessed 33 and Walter de Coutances and William de Humez each witnessed 16.) In 1180 he was in charge of Rouen in Henry's possession of Normandy, being named constable of the Tower of Rouen. Later, in 1184, he further served the king by hiring mercenaries in Normandy for service with King Henry II's campaign in Poitou. He appears to have led military forces for the king as well, being recorded several times as a commander of part of the royal forces in Potiou. He is last recorded in England during the period around 1187.

Hugh married Margaret, one of the daughters and heiresses of William de Chesney, the founder of Sibton Abbey. Margaret was one of three daughters, but she inherited the bulk of her father's estates. Although Margaret was the eldest daughter, the reason she received the bulk of the estates was King Henry's desire to reward Hugh, as the king arranged the marriage as well as ensuring that most of her father's lands went to her. Through Margaret, Hugh gained the barony of Blythburgh in Suffolk, which he had control of by 1174. He also acquired lands at Rottingdean in Sussex from Margaret.

== Death and legacy ==
Hugh died in 1189 around Easter at Rouen. His heir was his son Roger de Cressy, who died in 1246. Towards the end of his life, sometime between 1186 and 1189, Hugh gave a church at Cressy to the priory at St Lo in Rouen. On his deathbed he granted lands at Walberswick to Blythburgh Priory for the salvation of the souls of his parents and other ancestors as well as the souls of King Henry and Henry's brother William fitzEmpress. Margaret survived Hugh and married Robert fitzRoger and lived until at least 1214, when she paid a fine to the king for the right to her inheritance after the death of her second husband.
