= Roger fitzReinfrid =

12th-century English sheriff and royal justice

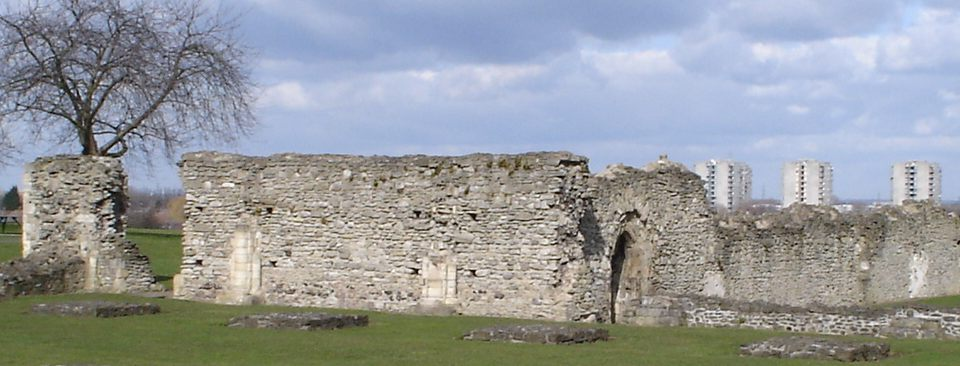
- Ruins of Lesnes Abbey in Bexley, where Roger donated property

Royal justice
- In office 1176–1196

Sheriff of Sussex
- In office 1176–1186

Sheriff of Berkshire
- In office 1186–1189

Personal details
- Died: 1196
- Spouse: Alice
- Relations: Brother Walter de Coutances; Brother or nephew John of Coutances
- Children: Gilbert fitzReinfrey; William
- Occupation: Royal administrator

Roger fitzReinfrid (sometimes Roger fitzReinfrey; died 1196) was a medieval English sheriff and royal justice. Probably born into a knightly family, Roger first was in the household of a nobleman before beginning royal service. His brother, Walter de Coutances, was a bishop and archbishop and likely helped advance Roger's career. Besides holding two sheriffdoms, Roger was entrusted with the control of a number of royal castles.

== Early life ==
Roger was the brother or brother-in-law of Walter de Coutances, who was Archbishop of Rouen from 1184 to 1207, and whose parents were named Reinfrid and Gonilla. Another relative was John of Coutances, who was either the brother of Walter and Roger, or their nephew. John went on to become Bishop of Worcester from 1196 to 1198. Possibly another brother of Roger's was Odo of Coutances, a canon at Rouen Cathedral. Roger and Walter's family was probably of knightly rank.

== Early career ==
In 1161, Roger paid scutage on property in Dorset, which was probably his inheritance. From 1168 to 1178, Roger was in the household of Richard de Lucy. Later he served as a royal justice. Another patron of Roger's was Simon de Senlis, the Earl of Huntingdon and Earl of Northampton, who gave a soke in London to Roger in July 1175. Roger was regularly employed by the king as a justice. In 1176, Henry II summoned Roger as a Serjeant-at-law, one of the first identifiable members of that order in the historical record. (Note: The others summoned by Henry were: 1168: Reginald de Warenne 1174: John de Cumin, William fitzRalph, and William fitzStephen 1176: William Basset along with Roger 1177: Hugh de Cressy 1179: Hugh de Gaerst, Ranulf de Glanvill, and Hugh Murdac 1182: William de Auberville and Osbert fitzHervey 1184: Ralph fitzStephen.) In 1177 Roger, along with Richard de Luci, the justiciar, and Gervase de Cornhill, assessed land taxes and heard judicial cases in Middlesex and Hampshire.

== Royal service ==
In 1173, Roger was granted custody of Windsor Castle, and retained control of Windsor until 1193, gaining the title of constable of the castle in 1179. In 1176, Roger was one of the 18 men named as justicias errantes, who were sent out in three panels of six men after the Assize of Northampton in January 1176. These panels were sent to hear cases and dispense justice as needed throughout the country. King Henry II of England named Roger as Sheriff of Sussex in 1176, which office he retained until 1187. Roger was also Sheriff of Berkshire from 1186 until the death of King Henry II in 1189.

After the death of King Henry, Roger's brother or brother-in-law Walter was put in charge of England while Henry's son Richard I was away on Crusade from 1191 to 1193. Roger profited from his brother's rise to power by receiving custody of Wallingford Castle, the Tower of London, and Bristol Castle.

Roger granted land to Launceston Priory for his and his wife's souls. He also held land at Ramsden Bellhouse, half a knight's fee, which he was granted by Gilbert Foliot, Bishop of London. The church on this land was later granted to Lesnes Abbey by Roger.

== Legacy ==
Roger's son Gilbert fitzReinfrey became a royal administrator. It appears, however, that Gilbert was illegitimate, as he did not inherit his father's lands, nor is the name of his mother known. Another son was William, who became a canon of Lincoln Cathedral, and was named Archdeacon of Rouen by Walter de Coutances.

Roger's wife was named Alice. Roger died in 1196, and his wife and mother were to be buried at St Mary Clerkenwell.
