= Reginald de Warenne =

12th-century Anglo-Norman nobleman and sheriff in England

- Born: Between 1121 and 1126
- Died: 1179
- Occupations: Feudal baron; Royal justice
- Spouse: Alice de Wormegay
- Children: William de Warenne; Gundrada; Alice; Possibly Muriel; Possibly Ela
- Parents: William de Warenne; Isabel de Vermandois

Reginald de Warenne (sometimes Rainald de Warenne; between 1121 and 1126 – 1179) was an Anglo-Norman nobleman and royal official. The third son of an earl, Reginald began his career as an administrator of his brother's estates and continued to manage them for his brother's successor, William, the second son of King Stephen. Reginald was involved in the process that led to the peaceful ascension of Henry fitzEmpress to the throne of England in 1154 and served the new king as a royal justice afterwards. He played a minor role in the Becket controversy in 1170, as a member of the party that met Becket on his return to England from exile in 1170.

Reginald married Alice, the heiress to the feudal barony of Wormegay in Norfolk. He died in 1179 and left a son and heir, William de Warenne, and at least two daughters.

== Origins ==
Reginald de Warenne was the third son of William de Warenne, the second earl of Surrey, and Isabel de Vermandois. Reginald, who was probably born between 1121 and 1126, had two brothers, William and Ralph, and two sisters: Gundrada, who married first Roger, Earl of Warwick and then William of Lancaster; and Ada, who married Henry, Earl of Huntingdon. Ada's husband was the only son of King David I of Scotland, and she was the mother of two kings of Scotland – Malcolm IV and William I. From their mother's first marriage, to Robert de Beaumont, Reginald was a half-brother of the twins Robert de Beaumont the Earl of Leicester, and Waleran de Beaumont, the Count of Meulan and Earl of Worcester. There was another Reginald de Warenne alive during Reginald's lifetime who may have been an illegitimate half-brother.

== Early career ==
Reginald first appears in the historical record in early 1138, signing some of his father William's charters as a witness. On William's death in May that year, his son William became the third earl of Surrey, and Reginald was one of the main administrators of his estates until William's death in 1148 at the Battle of Mount Cadmus during the Second Crusade. Reginald also had his own lands, granted from his brother's estates in Norfolk and Sussex. While William was on crusade, Reginald granted the right to form a merchant guild to the inhabitants of Lewes, as long as his brother agreed after his return. On William's death the earldom and estates passed to William's daughter Isabel. At the instigation of King Stephen of England, she married the King's second son, William, Count of Boulogne, who thus became Earl of Surrey. Reginald continued in his role as an administrator under the new Earl, eventually becoming his main advisor, and also began to serve the King, signing several royal charters as a witness.

Reginald was granted the castles of Bellencombre and Mortemer by a charter at Westminster in 1153. This charter, which Reginald was a witness to, laid out the rights that William, by then the only surviving son of King Stephen, would receive for not contesting the passage of the crown of England to Henry of Anjou after Stephen's death. Stephen died in 1154, and Henry succeeded him as Henry II; Reginald continued to serve as a royal official, witnessing several of the new King's charters.

== Royal service ==
In 1157 Reginald was one of the justices present when King Henry II decided a case between Hilary of Chichester, the Bishop of Chichester, and Walter de Luci, the Abbot of Battle Abbey. In 1164 he was present at the Council of Clarendon, which was part of the long struggle between Henry and the new Archbishop of Canterbury, Thomas Becket, over control of the English church. Reginald was also in the party which accompanied the King's daughter, Matilda, to Germany for her marriage to Henry the Lion, Duke of Saxony.

Reginald was one of the four main justices involved with the general eyre (Note: An eyre was an occasional circuit court, with justices sent out by the king on circuits of the shires to hear civil and criminal cases. England was divided into multiple circuits.) between 1168 and 1170, along with Richard of Ilchester, Guy the Dean of Waltham Holy Cross, and William Basset. (Note: Writing in 1942, Edward Warren argued that in 1168 Henry II summoned Reginald as a serjeant-at-law, but later researchers have not agreed with Warren's conclusions. According to Warren, the others summoned by Henry were: 1174: John de Cumin, William fitzRalph, William fitzStephen 1176: William Basset, Roger fitzReinfrid 1177: Hugh de Cressy 1179: Hugh de Gaerst, Ranulf de Glanvill, Hugh Murdac 1182: William de Auberville, Osbert fitzHervey 1184: Ralph fitzStephen.) Besides these administrative and judicial roles, Reginald was a baron of the exchequer in 1169 and held the office of sheriff of Sussex from 1170 to 1176, and was a member of the King's Council, or curia regis, in 1170.

In 1170, Reginald was involved in attempts to keep Thomas Becket, who had been in exile, from returning to England. Working with Reginald were Gervase de Cornhill, the Sheriff of Kent; Ranulf de Broc; and three senior ecclesiastics that Becket had excommunicated: Roger de Pont L'Évêque, the Archbishop of York; Gilbert Foliot, the Bishop of London; and Josceline de Bohon, the Bishop of Salisbury. Reginald was a member of the party that met Becket at Sandwich on 1 December 1170 when the archbishop returned to England. This group, led by Gervase of Cornhill, complained that the archbishop was sowing dissension in the land by his excommunication of Roger of York and the two bishops, but Becket managed to calm the officials by stating he would consider the matter and reply to them the next day. At the meeting the following day, the group was joined by several clergymen sent by the excommunicated ecclesiastics, but nothing was accomplished beyond further offers by Becket to consider alternative options. Reginald was involved in a subsequent attempt to resolve the differences between the King and Becket later in the month, which again came to nothing.

In 1173, Reginald worked for the King, along with Richard fitzNigel and Nicholas de Sigillo, to assess a land tax on parts of the royal estate. They assessed the tax in Buckinghamshire, Bedfordshire, Oxfordshire, Kent and Sussex. During the Revolt of 1173–1174 Reginald served the King as castellan of Hastings Castle.

== Death and legacy ==
Reginald married Alice, the daughter and heiress of William de Wormegay, Baron of Wormegay in Norfolk, who died in 1166. Reginald was fined just over 466 pounds by the King for the right to inherit his father-in-law's lands and become Lord of Wormegay, or Baron Wormegay. (Note: The sources do not define the exact basis for the king imposing this fine.) This lordship was assessed at fourteen and a quarter knight's fees and was located mostly in Norfolk and Suffolk. The centre of this land was Lynn, in Norfolk.

Reginald gave up his public duties in 1176. Although his considerable debts (including the levy for the Wormegay Barony) had been tacitly ignored while he was in the king's service, as soon as he retired the Exchequer demanded that he start to quickly repay them. Sometime between Michaelmas 1178 and the start of 1179, Reginald became a monk at Lewes Priory in Sussex, which had been founded by his family in the previous century. He died in 1179, still owing a large portion of the fine levied against him for the inheritance of his father-in-law's estates. His heir was his son William de Warenne, and he also had at least two daughters. One was Gundrada, who married three times: first to Peter de Valognes, son of Roger de Valognes; then to William de Courcy; and finally to Geoffrey Hose. Another daughter, Alice, married Peter, Constable of Mealton. A possible third daughter, Muriel, was a nun at Carrow Abbey, and another possible daughter, Ela, married Duncan the Earl of Fife.

The historian Edmund King has called Reginald "the fixer in that formidable family". Reginald gave lands and gifts to several monasteries. Among these were the Warenne family foundations of Lewes and Castle Acre Priory, with further gifts to Carrow, Clerkenwell Priory, and Binham Priory.
