= Ralph fitzStephen =

12th and 13th-century English sheriff and royal official

Sheriff of Gloucestershire
- In office 1171–75
- Monarch: Henry II of England

Ralph fitzStephen (sometimes Ralf fitzStephen; died either 25 July 1202 or c. 1204) was an English nobleman and royal official.

== Origins ==
Ralph had brothers named William fitzStephen, and Eustace. They were probably the sons of Stephen the chamberlain, who is mentioned as a royal chamberlain in the pipe roll for 1156–57.

== Career ==
Ralph was a royal chamberlain for King Henry II of England and King Richard I of England, serving in that office until at least 1191. His work would have involved not just household duties, but the financial aspects of the office, both accepting monies owed to the royal household and paying salaries and other expenses of the king's chamber. In 1170 he was appointed as one of the "tutors" to the eldest living son of the king, Henry. Ralph was a frequent witness on royal charters, and during the last years of Henry's reign was also responsible for the maintenance of Queen Eleanor of Aquitaine, who was incarcerated in house arrest by the king.

Ralph was Sheriff of Gloucestershire, from 1171 to 1175, succeeded by his brother William. (Note: William held office until 1189.) Ralph served as a royal justice for the southwest in 1176 and continued as a justice in other counties until 1190. He assessed the tallage, a tax, from 1176 to 1190 also. In 1184, Henry II summoned Ralph as a Serjeant-at-law, one of the first identifiable members of that order in the historical record. (Note: The others summoned by Henry were: 1168: Reginald de Warenne 1174: John de Cumin, William fitzRalph, William fitzStephen 1176: William Basset, Roger fitzReinfrid 1177: Hugh de Cressy 1179: Hugh de Gaerst, Ranulf de Glanvill, Hugh Murdac 1182: William de Auberville, Osbert fitzHervey.)

King Henry gave Ralph the manors of Wapley and Winterbourne in Gloucestershire. In the feudal inquest of 1166, Ralph listed him as holding half a knight's fee at the honour of Totnes, one fee from the bishop of Exeter, and two fees at Crich in Derbyshire that were part of Hubert fitzRalph's honour there. At some point, he held a fee at Blackwell, Derbyshire from Robert fitzRandulf, as he gave that fee as a marriage portion to his niece Idonea when she married William fitzRandulf. Sometime between 1186 and 1190, Ralph granted a third of a knight's fee at Potterspury in Northamptonshire to Geoffrey fitzPeter, another royal official.

== Family and death ==
Ralph married Maud or Matilda, the daughter of Robert de Calz. According to the historian Katharine Keats-Rohan, the marriage took place sometime before 1177, as on that date he was given the forestership of Sherwood Forest which had been held by Robert de Calz. But Julia Boorman in Ralph's entry in the Oxford Dictionary of National Biography says the marriage occurred around 1184 or 1185. Ralph controlled Sherwood Forest until 1197, as well as Chippenham Forest in Wiltshire from 1176 to 1190. Ralph may be the same as the Ralph fitzStephen who was given custody of Guildford Castle in Surrey in 1192 and 1193.

According to Keats-Rohan, Ralph died around 1204 and had no issue from his marriage. Boorman, however, states he died on 25 July 1202. According to Keats-Rohan, Maud/Matilda married Adam fitzPeter of Birkin after Ralph's death, but Boorman says that Maud/Matilda was the widow of fitzPeter when she married Ralph. Ralph gave gifts to Haverholme Priory, Darley Abbey, Gloucester Abbey, and Stanley Abbey. In 1225 the king recognised Richard of Gloucester as Ralph's nearest heir and confirmed his custody of Winterbourne. Boorman speculates that Richard might have been Ralph's son by a previous marriage before Maud/Matilda.
