= John of Tynemouth =

John of Tynemouth may refer to:

- John of Tynemouth (canon lawyer) (died 1221), English canon lawyer
- John of Tynemouth (geometer), 13th-century English geometer and mathematician
- John of Tynemouth (chronicler), 14th-century English chronicler
