= Peter de Ros =

12th-century Anglo-Norman monk and royal judge

Peter de Ros (died 1196 or 1197) was a medieval English monk and Archdeacon of Carlisle.

Peter was a royal justice as well as a monk of the cathedral chapter of Carlisle Cathedral. He became Archdeacon of Carlisle sometime before 17 June 1190, as he is named in a document of that date as holding that office.

During his time in office, Peter got into a dispute with Geoffrey the Archbishop of York. Geoffrey confiscated the revenues of Peter's office, along with the revenues of Henry Marshal the Dean of York, Burchard du Puiset the Treasurer of York Minster, and the canons Hugh Murdac and Adam of Thornover. Geoffrey refused to restore the incomes unless the offenders came barefoot into York Minster and begged for the archbishop's forgiveness. This all but Marshal did and they had their official revenues restored.

Peter was last listed as archdeacon in a document dated to 26 November 1194. He died in 1196 or 1197.
