= Simon of Apulia =

Italian-born prelate of the Catholic Church in England (died 1223)

- Bishop of Exeter
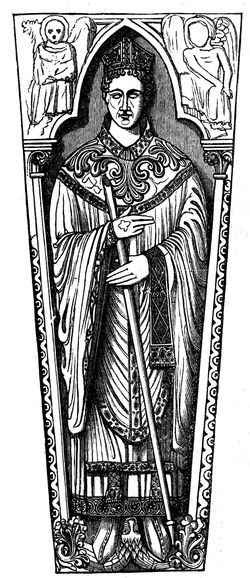
- Simon, Bishop of Exeter (died 1223); from his tomb at Exeter, showing rich mass-vestments.
- Church: Catholic
- Diocese: Exeter
- Elected: c. 13 April 1214
- Term ended: 9 September 1223
- Predecessor: Henry Marshal
- Successor: William Briwere
- Other post: Dean of York

Orders
- Consecration: 5 October 1214

Personal details
- Died: 9 September 1223
- Buried: Exeter Cathedral

Simon of Apulia (died 1223) was an Italian-born canon lawyer who served as Bishop of Exeter in Devon, England, from 1214 until his death in 1223.

== Life ==
Nothing is known of Simon's early life beyond the fact that he was a native of southern Italy and that he was a canon lawyer and a magister.

Simon was a canon of the cathedral chapter of York some time before being named Chancellor of the cathedral and then Dean of York in January 1194, after a lengthy election dispute. Originally, Geoffrey, Archbishop of York had wanted his brother Peter as dean, but then suggested Simon, who refused to give up his office of chancellor. Geoffrey then selected Philip of Poitou, but the cathedral chapter wanted Simon, and all parties appealed to Rome. He was appointed Dean of York by Pope Celestine III.

Simon was elected to the see of Exeter about 13 April 1214 and consecrated on 5 October 1214. The see had been vacant since 1206, when Henry Marshal the previous bishop had died. However, because of King John of England's dispute with Pope Innocent III, the vacancy was not filled until a settlement was reached between John and Pope Innocent. Simon was consecrated by Archbishop Stephen Langton at Canterbury.

Simon attended the Fourth Lateran Council, but was back in England in time to take part in King Henry III's coronation on 28 October 1216. Very little of his administrative records survives; only a few documents are still extant. Simon did set out the boundaries of the parishes in the city of Exeter. He was also a benefactor to his cathedral, giving it vestments and other ornaments.

Simon died on 9 September 1223. He was buried in Exeter Cathedral in the lady chapel. His nephew, also named Simon, was named archdeacon of Cornwall from 1218 to 1221.

== Citations ==
Catholic Church titles
Preceded by Henry Marshal	Bishop of Exeter; 1214–1223	Succeeded by William Briwere
