= Hamo (dean of York) =

12th and 13th-century English Dean of York

- Dean of York
- See: Diocese of York
- Appointed: 1216
- Term ended: after 24 August 1219
- Predecessor: William Testard
- Successor: Roger de Insula
- Other posts: Treasurer of York; Precentor of York

Personal details
- Died: after 24 August 1219

Hamo was a 12th- and 13th-century English cleric. He was the Diocese of York's dean, treasurer, and precentor, as well as the archdeacon of the East Riding. His background is unknown, but he was probably a canon of the cathedral chapter at York Minster by 1171. He claimed to have been treasurer of the chapter by 1189, but did not actually hold the office until 1199. Hamo clashed with his archbishop, Geoffrey several times, and when Geoffrey died, Hamo's fellow canons were forbidden by King John of England from electing Hamo to succeed Geoffrey. Hamo died sometime after 1219, when he was last attested as holding his final office, dean.

== Early career ==
Nothing is known of Hamo's background or early years. Hamo first appears as a prebendary of the cathedral chapter of York sometime between 1162 and 1174, but he was probably a canon at York before 1171. He may have held the prebend of Husthwaite. By 1177 he had been appointed to the office of precentor of York. (Note: David Carpenter argues that William of Eu, the previous holder of the office, did not die until between Easter 1178 and November 1181, which would push Hamo's entry into the office until after that time.) He held that office until at least 1195, perhaps as late as 1198, as he was mentioned in a document dated to between 1194 and 1198.

== Disputes with Geoffrey ==
In September 1189 Hamo claimed that he had been appointed to the treasurership in 1181, but did not actually hold the office until 1199. In 1192 the Archbishop of York, Geoffrey, tried to replace Burchard du Puiset, the treasurer of York, with Hamo, as part of Geoffrey's disputes with Burchard and other members of the cathedral chapter. The dispute over the treasurership was resolved by the gift of a church to Hamo by Burchard and Hamo's relinquishing of any claim to the office. (Note: The church was the one at Alne previously held by Burchard.)

Hamo probably was part of a deputation to Germany by members of the cathedral chapter when Geoffrey tried to interfere in the election of a dean, against the choice of the chapter. The king, Richard, was being held prisoner there and in order to secure the royal approval for the chapter's choice, the canons had to send a deputation to the king. They were successful and secured their choice over Geoffrey's. The historian Everett Crosby notes that Hamo was not a witness to any of Geoffrey's surviving charters from the 1190s, although Hamo's own charters are extant. Crosby feels that this is a sign of conflict between Geoffrey and the cathedral chapter at York during this period.

By 1199 Hamo was treasurer of York, an office he held along with the Archdeaconry of East Riding, as the two had been combined for over 100 years. Hamo was the final treasurer to hold the East Riding alongside the treasurership, being last-named in the office in 1216. Hamo may have been Dean of York by 1217, but had certainly been appointed by 1 March 18, when his presence is first documented. His last certain appearance as dean was on 24 August 1219, but he had been succeeded in office by Roger de Insula by early April 1220.

Besides those offices in the cathedral chapter, Hamo received the office of sacrist of the chapel of St Mary and Holy Angels before 22 November 1181, when he is recorded in that office. In September 1186, Hamo was one of the candidates for the archbishopric of York put forward by the cathedral chapter, but King Henry II did not approve of his candidature and he did not get elected. (Note: The other four candidates were Hubert Walter (the Dean of York), Laurence (the Archdeacon of Bedford), Roger Arundel, and Bernard (the prior of Newburgh Priory).) In 1208, he had a monetary interest in Bishop Wilton. When Archbishop Geoffrey died, King John wrote to the cathedral chapter at York, forbidding them to elect Hamo to the see. If they did so, John told them they would be out of favour, and the chapter seems to have taken this to heart as Hamo was not selected as Geoffrey's successor.

== Death and legacy ==
Hamo died sometime after 24 August 1219, when he last appears as dean. Hamo had a son also named Hamo, who is mentioned in the records between 1199 and 1215. (Note: Although a 4th-century church ruling forbade priests from marrying, it was mostly ignored until the 12th-century when papal reformers began to push for priests to not only remain unmarried but to be celibate as well. By the end of the 12th century most priests no longer married, but some continued to have concubines and children. Such children were considered illegitimate. It is not clear what the status of Hamo's son was, however.)
