= Honorius of Kent =

13th-century English priest and canon lawyer

- Archdeacon of Richmond
- Archdiocese: York
- Appointed: 1198
- Term ended: after 1208

Personal details
- Born: Honorius
- Died: after 1210

Honorius of Kent (sometimes known as Honorius Magister; died after 1210) was a medieval English Archdeacon of Richmond and canon lawyer.

== Early career ==
Honorius was given the title of magister, signifying that he had a university education. A native of Kent, he was a student at Paris sometime between 1185 and 1192. By 1192, he was teaching at Oxford, and in that year, he pleaded a case before the papal legates John of Cornwall and Robert of Melun at Oxford. Honorius, along with John of Tynemouth and Simon of Southwell, and perhaps Nicholas de Aquila, are the first known teachers of canon law at Oxford.

== Service to Geoffrey and Hubert Walter ==
Honorius was a clerk for Geoffrey, the Archbishop of York, serving Geoffrey from 1195, and held an unidentified prebend in the diocese of York. In 1198, Honorius was appointed Archdeacon of Richmond by Geoffrey, but King Richard I of England appointed Roger de Sancto Edmundo instead. Honorius was then expelled from office, but appealed to the papacy and eventually secured recognition of his tenure of office in 1202. While still involved in proving his case for holding the archdeaconry, he left Geoffrey's service and by 1202 at the latest was serving Hubert Walter, the Archbishop of Canterbury, who gave him two benefices. While in Walter's service, he was often associated with John of Tynemouth and Simon of Southwell. Honorius accompanied John in 1203 when both men attempted to mediate between Walter and Gerald of Wales. He was also employed by Walter at Rome, where he served as the archbishop's proctor at the Curia in a case involving the abbot of Thorney Abbey.

== Royal service and death ==
After Walter's death in 1205, Honorius was employed by King John as one of the king's proctors at Rome during the controversy over the election to succeed Walter at Canterbury. Later, though, in 1208, Honorius opposed the king and was again deprived of office, with his last mention in official records being in the Pipe Roll for 1208–1209. He died sometime after 1210.

== Writings ==
As a canonist, Honorius was the author of a treatise entitled Summa decretalium quaestionum, which exists in six or seven manuscripts. The Summa was written between 1186 and 1190. The work is divided into three parts covering procedures, laws relating to consecration and church offices, and marriage. Honorius wrote as part of an Anglo-Norman school of decretalists, and his Summa was the most commonly used work of that school. His arrangement of his work influenced many later decretalists. He also did glosses on Gratian's Decretum. He is also credited with another work, De iure canonico tractaturus, but this attribution is not secure. This last work survives in only one manuscript copy. The medieval chronicler Thomas of Marlborough called Honorius one of his teachers, along with Simon and John.
