= Burchard du Puiset =

12th-century Treasurer of York Minster and cleric

- Treasurer
- See: Diocese of York
- Appointed: 15 September 1189
- Term ended: after October 1194
- Predecessor: Geoffrey
- Successor: Eustace
- Other posts: Archdeacon of the East Riding; Archdeacon of Durham

Personal details
- Died: 6 January 1196

Burchard du Puiset (Note: Sometimes Bourchard du Puiset, or Bourchard of Le Puiset) (died 1196) was a medieval Anglo-Norman clergyman and treasurer of the diocese of York. Either the nephew or son of Hugh du Puiset, the Bishop of Durham, Burchard held a number of offices in the dioceses of York and Durham before being appointed treasurer by King Richard I of England in 1189. His appointment was opposed by the newly appointed Archbishop Geoffrey, leading to a long dispute between Geoffrey and Burchard that was not resolved until the mid-1190s. After the death of Hugh du Puiset, Burchard was a candidate for Hugh's old bishopric, but lost out in the end to another candidate. Burchard died in 1196.

== Background and early career ==
Burchard was a relative of Hugh du Puiset, the Bishop of Durham. Some sources name him as Hugh's nephew, but other sources call him Hugh's son, including the modern biographer of Hugh. (Note: The chronicler Roger of Howden states that Hugh du Puiset had three sons, and names only two of them. Roger specifically states that Burchard was Hugh's nephew, but there is no documentary evidence that Hugh's brother Evrard du Puiset had a son named Burchard.) G. W. S. Barrow, the author of the entry for Hugh in the Oxford Dictionary of National Biography, merely states that Burchard could possibly be the son of Hugh. (Note: Hugh du Puiset had at least two securely attested sons – Henry, who became a knight, and Hugh, who became the chancellor to King Philip II of France. Besides the possible case of Burchard, Hugh may have had another son, William, who was Archdeacon of Northumberland. Hugh had a brother named Burchard also, besides his eldest brother Evrard.) Burchard was among the most common witnesses to Hugh's charters, and Hugh's biographer calls Burchard the "intimate counsellor" of the bishop.

Burchard held a prebend in the cathedral chapter of York, although the exact prebend that he held is unknown. He then held the office of archdeacon for the East Riding, which he held along with the archdeaconry of Durham; all known mentions of his archdeaconry of the East Riding also call him archdeacon of Durham. He acquired the Durham archdeaconry before 24 May 1172, when he first appears holding the office, and held it until his death. Burchard also held a number of churches, including those at Heighington Alne, and Aycliffe. Hugh is thought to have wanted the archbishopric of York for Burchard, most notably in 1189.

In 1172, Burchard witnessed a charter of Henry the Liberal, Count of Champagne, written at Troyes. A further charter of Henry's in 1175 mentions a "Burchard archdeacon" who is named as a relative of Henry's. This may also be Burchard du Puiset.

== Treasurer of York ==
Burchard was appointed as treasurer of York by King Richard I of England on 15 September 1189, but his appointment was at first opposed by the newly chosen Archbishop of York, Geoffrey. Along with Burchard, Richard also appointed Henry Marshal the dean; and Roger of London the abbot of Selby Abbey. Because of Geoffrey's objections, his estates were confiscated by the king until he submitted. (Note: The historians Ralph Turner and Richard Heiser speculate that Richard's strategy in making these appointments was to keep Geoffrey distracted by problems within his diocese, and thus unable to challenge for the English throne. The two historians also suggest that Richard may have been making an example of Geoffrey, in a demonstration that he could be harsh even with his own relatives.) Burchard and Marshal retaliated by accusing the archbishop-elect of being a murderer as well as the son of a prostitute. (Note: That this sort of accusation was not uncommon in ecclesiastical affairs is borne out by G. V. Scammell's description of the charges as an "almost customary defamation".) When Geoffrey visited York in October 1189, both Burchard and Marshal requested their installation in their offices, but Geoffrey refused to do so until he himself was confirmed in his archbishopric by the papacy. Geoffrey's refusal to install the royal nominees meant the archbishop-elect was out of favour with Richard, and the king refused to allow Geoffrey's officials to travel to Rome to request confirmation of the archbishopric.

Geoffrey accepted Burchard's appointment in December 1189, but then excommunicated Burchard in January 1190. The excommunication, which was shared with Henry Marshal, was retaliation for a dispute with the archbishop-elect that happened during a church service. The actual dispute occurred on 5 January 1190 when Burchard and Marshal were conducting vespers, either early or on time, depending on whose side was telling the story. Geoffrey appeared in the middle of their service and attempted to perform the same service, either late or on time, again depending on who was relating the story. When Burchard and Marshal finished their service, they put out all the lights in the church, leaving the archbishop in the dark. Despite that, he finished the service but then complained to the cathedral chapter of York about the incident. Attempts to mediate a dispute led nowhere, and the citizens of York soon became involved. Geoffrey attempted to keep the townspeople from abusing his two opponents, but Burchard was eventually forced to take refuge in the tomb of William of York, an earlier Archbishop of York. Hugh du Puiset then intervened with the king, and Geoffrey once more lost the royal favour. The king sent Burchard to Rome, along with Reginald fitzJocelin the Bishop of Bath, to attempt to secure the deposition of Geoffrey from York. Although Burchard's efforts in Rome in mid-1190 contributed to a papal prohibition on Geoffrey's consecration by Pope Clement III, Geoffrey was not deposed. Burchard did secure his own absolution from the excommunication placed by Geoffrey in January.

Burchard, along with Marshal and other members of the chapter, was often opposed to the actions of their archbishop. They objected to the archbishop having given a large part of York's treasury towards Richard's ransom, (Note: Richard was held captive in Germany while returning from crusade and was only released after the payment of a ransom, which was 150,000 marks. To raise this sum, all of Richard's subjects were taxed at the rate of 25% for both their incomes and their possessions. These payments were required from both laymen and the clergy.) and to some of the archiepiscopal appointments in the church of York. Burchard and the others charged Geoffrey with simony, extortion, and neglect of his duties, and the archbishop, in return, excommunicated the ringleaders more than once, and locked the canons out of church. The disputes flared up in 1192, with Burchard facing an effort by Geoffrey to replace him in the treasurership with Hamo, but the dispute was resolved by the gift of a church to Hamo by Burchard and Hamo's relinquishing of any claim to the treasurership. (Note: The church was the one at Alne previously held by Burchard.) At another dispute, Geoffrey had confiscated the revenues of Burchard's offices, along with the revenues of Marshal, Peter de Ros the Archdeacon of Carlisle, and the canons Hugh Murdac and Adam of Thornover. Geoffrey refused to restore the incomes unless the offenders came barefoot into York Minster and begged for the archbishop's forgiveness. This all but Marshal did, and they had their official revenues restored.

== Later life ==
Burchard continued to hold the treasurership until at least October 1194, when he is last mentioned in the office. In 1195, after the death of Hugh du Puiset, Burchard was a candidate for the see of Durham, perhaps as part of a plan by his relative to pass the office on to his family. In June 1195, both Burchard and his rival, Philip of Poitou, were at the royal court in Le Mans, presumably both attempting to secure the bishopric. Philip was appointed to the see in November 1195.

Burchard died on 6 January 1196.
