= Roger of London =

12th-century English abbot of Selby Abbey

- Abbot of Selby Abbey
- Appointed: 16 September 1189
- Term ended: January 1198
- Predecessor: Gilbert de Vere
- Successor: Richard
- Other post: Prior of Selby Abbey

Personal details
- Died: January 1198

Roger of London was an English Benedictine monk and Abbot of Selby Abbey from 1189 to 1195.

Roger was Prior of Selby Abbey before his appointment as abbot at the council of Pipewell on 16 September 1189. Roger was appointed by King Richard I of England, who also appointed two other men to offices within the diocese of York: he made Henry Marshal the Dean of York and Burchard du Puiset the treasurer of York Minster treasurer. Geoffrey, the archbishop of York and illegitimate half-brother of the king, objected to these appointments, and as a result Geoffrey's estates were confiscated by the king until he submitted. The historians Ralph Turner and Richard Heiser speculate that Richard's strategy in making these appointments was to keep Geoffrey distracted by problems within his diocese, and thus unable to challenge for the English throne.

Roger was blessed as abbot on 6 December 1189. He died in January 1198.
