= Simon of Wells =

13th-century Bishop of Chichester

- Bishop of Chichester
- Elected: April 1204
- Predecessor: Seffrid II
- Successor: Nicholas de Aquila
- Other post: Archdeacon of Wells

Orders
- Consecration: 11 July 1204

Personal details
- Died: 21 August 1207 France

Simon of Wells (Note: Or Simon Sutwell or Simon de Wells or Simon FitzRobert or Simon de Camera) (died 1207) was a medieval Bishop of Chichester, England.

== Life ==
Simon was the son of Robert and was in the household of Hubert Walter, Archbishop of Canterbury in 1194. His father was usually known as Robert of Whatley and held land in Somerset. Some sources state that he was related to the brothers Hugh of Wells bishop of Lincoln and Jocelin of Wells bishop of Bath and Wells, but this is unlikely. By 1198 he was Archdeacon of Wells. He was also Provost of Beverley and a prebend of London and Salisbury. He was in Normandy with King John of England in both 1199 and 1203, when the king was campaigning against King Philip Augustus of France. By 1201 he was serving the king as a clerk of the chamber, or camera, which led to one of his names. Also in 1201, King John tried to give him the church of Faversham, but the church was owned by the monks of St Augustine's Abbey Canterbury. The monks appealed to Rome and kept Simon from receiving the church. The next year, in 1202, Hubert Walter asked the king to allow Simon to have custody of Fleet Prison, as well as being the guardian of the heir of Robert of Leveland, who was going on crusade. He was elected to the see of Chichester between 4 April and 9 April 1204, and consecrated on 11 July 1204.

After Simon's election, he concentrated on building in his cathedral city, walling Chichester, and recovering lost lands of the diocese. He did continue to work for the king up until the death of Hubert Walter, but after that event, he no longer appears in royal service. He died 21 August 1207 while returning from pilgrimage to Santiago de Compostela at St Giles in the south of France. Besides his profession of obedience to the archbishop of Canterbury, 12 genuine documents survive from his episcopate.

== Citations ==
Catholic Church titles
Preceded by Seffrid II	Bishop of Chichester; 1204–1207	Succeeded by Nicholas de Aquila
