= Nicholas de Sigillo =

12th-century Anglo-Norman ecclesiastic and royal administrator

- Archdeacon of Huntingdon
- Appointed: c. 1164
- Term ended: after 1187
- Predecessor: Henry of Huntingdon
- Successor: Robert de Hardres
- Other post: Royal clerk

Personal details
- Born: Nicholas

Nicholas de Sigillo was a medieval Anglo-Norman administrator and clergyman in England. Perhaps beginning his career as a royal official during the reign of King Stephen of England, he had certainly entered royal service by 1157 when he was serving Stephen's successor King Henry II, and was a witness on a number of royal charters from 1157 to 1159.

Sometime before 1166 Nicholas was appointed to the archdeaconry of Huntingdon. While in office there, he attempted to reform both the administrative and religious practices of his archdeaconry. In 1173 Nicholas once more served Henry, this time assessing royal taxes. He last appears alive in 1187 when he is still named as an archdeacon. He may be the Nicholas who gave a still extant first volume of the Bible to Lincoln Cathedral.

== Early career ==
Nicholas derived his name from his office, as he was clericus de sigillo, the next highest office in the royal chancery after the chancellor. It is unknown when he first held royal office, but it is possible it was during the reign of King Stephen of England (reigned 1135–1154). One document of Stephen's reign states that he was master of Stephen's writing chamber. He held a prebend in the diocese of Lincoln by the middle of the 1150s.

Sometime between 1148 and 1160 Robert de Chesney, the Bishop of Lincoln granted a church to Nicholas to hold for life, on the condition that he would lose possession of the church if he either became a monk or if he was elevated to a bishopric. In 1157 Nicholas was a royal administrator as he was involved with King Henry II's invasion of Wales. In the years 1157 through 1159 he was a witness to the king's charters.

== Archdeacon ==
Sometime between 1164 and 1166 he was appointed Archdeacon of Huntingdon, in succession to the medieval chronicler Henry of Huntingdon. The most likely date of his appointment is 1164 or early 1165. After his appointment, John of Salisbury wrote to him, congratulating Nicholas on his new office. John also commented that Nicholas would need to change his opinion of the chances that archdeacons had of reaching salvation now that he held that office.

Nicholas, as part of his duties as archdeacon, heard disputes between clergy over church property. One such dispute was heard sometime between 1164 and 1185 by Nicholas, along with the synod of his archdeaconry, over land in Woodstone parish that was disputed between the parish and the Fens monastic house of Thorney Abbey. Between 1164 and 1166 Nicholas put canons from Malton Priory in Yorkshire as the clergy of the church at King's Walden in Hertfordshire. Nicholas also instituted a set of "constitutions" or regulations for the clergy of his archdeaconry. This was part of Nicholas' efforts to reform the administrative and ecclesiastical affairs of his office.

== Later years ==
In 1173 Nicholas was once again working for the king, when he, along with Richard fitz Nigel and Reginald de Warenne, assessed a land tax on the royal demesne. These three men assessed the tax in the counties of Buckinghamshire, Bedfordshire, Oxfordshire, Kent and Sussex. Nicholas is last mentioned in the historical record in 1187, as an archdeacon without territorial title. During the reign of King John, a legal case documents that Nicholas gave a messuage to his niece (or possibly a granddaughter) Emma. Nicholas may be the same Nicholas whose death was commemorated on 13 March at Lincoln Cathedral and gave a gift of the first volume of the Great Bible to the cathedral, where it remains as Lincoln, MS 1; the second volume is now at Trinity College, Cambridge.
