= Richard Blund =

13th-century Bishop of Exeter

- Bishop of Exeter
- Arms of Richard Blund, Bishop of Exeter: Lozengy or and sable
- Elected: c. 30 January 1245
- Term ended: 26 December 1257
- Predecessor: William Briwere
- Successor: Walter Branscombe

Orders
- Consecration: 22 October 1245 by Boniface of Savoy

Personal details
- Died: 26 December 1257
- Denomination: Catholic

Richard Blund (or Richard Blundy; died 1257) was a medieval Bishop of Exeter.

== Life ==
Blund's family was an important one in the city of Exeter, as his brother Hilary was mayor of Exeter twice, from 1224 to 1230 and from about 1234 to 1235. Because Richard is given the title of magister or master, it is assumed that he attended a university, but which one is unknown. He was a canon of Exeter Cathedral.

Blund was elected about 30 January 1245 and consecrated on 22 October 1245 at Reading by the Archbishop of Canterbury, Boniface of Savoy. Little is known of his activities as bishop, although the medieval chronicler Matthew Paris considered him a good choice for bishop.

Blund died on 26 December 1257. After his death, a number of his clerks used his seal to forge letters giving away the bishop's property and awarding benefices.

== Citations ==
Catholic Church titles
Preceded by William Briwere	Bishop of Exeter; 1245–1257	Succeeded by Walter Branscombe
