= Walter Branscombe =

13th-century Bishop of Exeter

- Bishop of Exeter
- Arms of Walter Branscombe: Or, on a chevron sable three quatrefoils of the field two keys in chief and a sword in base argent
- Elected: 23 February 1258
- Installed: 14 April 1258
- Term ended: 22 July 1280
- Predecessor: Richard Blund
- Successor: Peter Quinel
- Other post: Archdeacon of Surrey

Orders
- Ordination: 9 March 1258
- Consecration: 10 March 1258 by Boniface of Savoy

Personal details
- Born: c. 1220
- Died: 22 July 1280
- Buried: Exeter Cathedral
- Denomination: Catholic

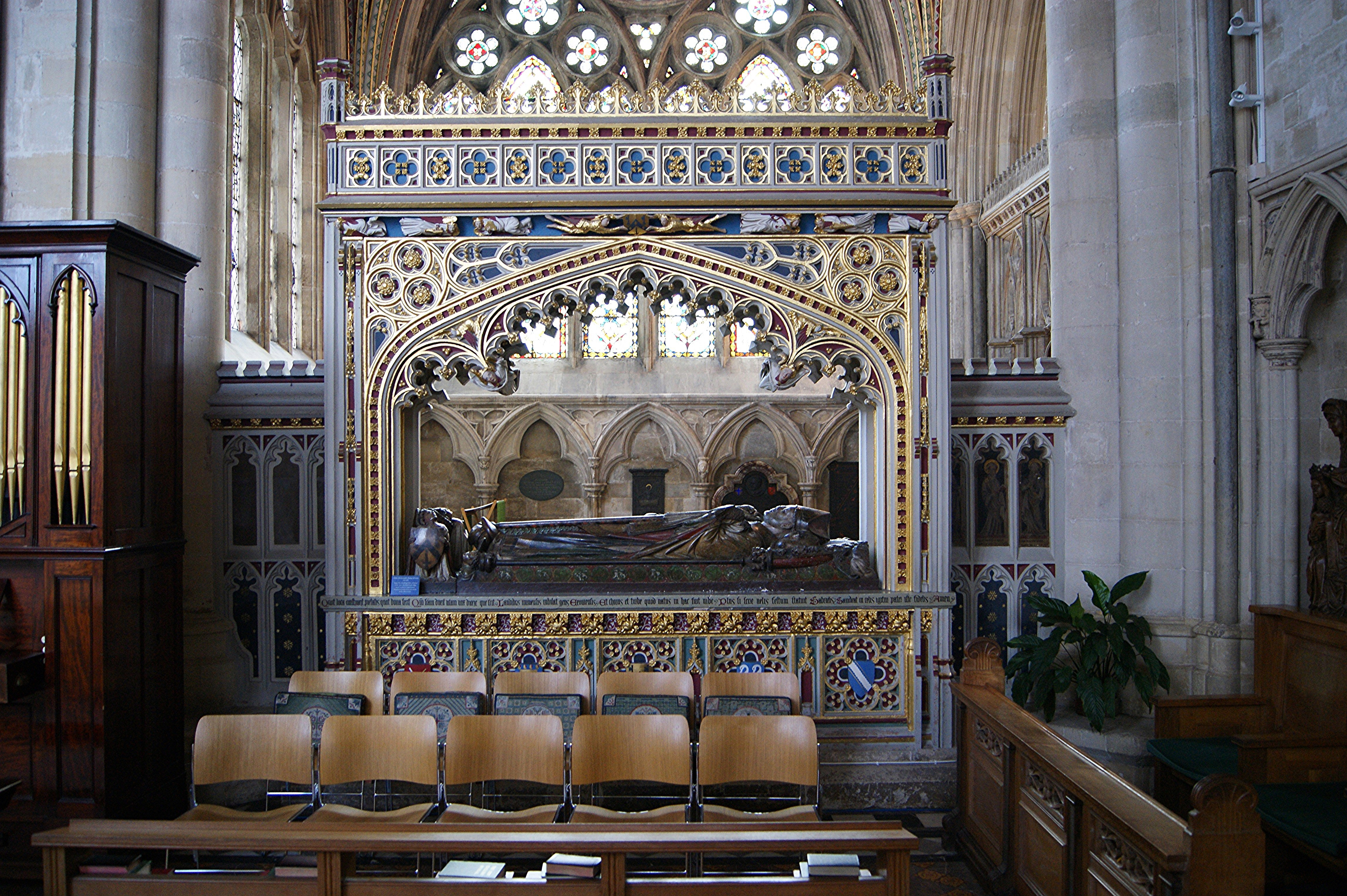
Monument with effigy of Walter Branscombe, Exeter Cathedral. The effigy is contemporary with the bishop, but the chest-tomb and canopy were added in the 15th century to match the monument of Bishop Edmund Stafford (1344–1419) on the opposite side of the Lady Chapel

Walter Branscombe (Note: Also spelled Bronscombe, Branescombe, Bronescombe, or Bronescomb) (c. 1220–1280) was Bishop of Exeter from 1258 to 1280.

== Origins ==
Nothing for certain is known of Walter Branscombe's origins and education, but he is thought to have been born in Exeter in about 1220. In the opinion of William George Hoskins he was a member of the family of de Branscombe seated at the manor of Edge in the parish of Branscombe east Devon, situated about 16 miles east of Exeter; although others appear to dispute this. John Prince (1643–1723), in his Worthies of Devon, says he was a native of Exeter, and "born there of poor and mean parentage". Prince appears to be quoting an earlier authority, Bishop Francis Godwin (1562–1633), who writes of Walter Bronscombe: "Patre natus Exoniensi cive, sed tenuissimae sortis et ex plebe infimâ ("He was born to a father who was a citizen of Exeter, but of the least and lowest of the common people"), and it is not clear that the Branscombe family, who filled various positions of responsibility and authority in the fourteenth century, married into the high Devonshire families of Courtenay and Champernowne, held land at Colyton, and took their name from the parish ever lived at Edge, Branscombe which, from the reign of King Edward III, was home to the Wadham family.

== Career ==
Branscombe held a prebend in of St Nicholas's College at Wallingford Castle, as well as a number of other benefices. He also was archdeacon of Surrey. In 1250, he acted as King Henry III of England's representative at the papal curia, and was appointed the king's proctor the next year. Besides being a royal clerk, he was often named as a papal chaplain also. Before 1254 he became a canon of Exeter Cathedral.

Branscombe was elected to the see of Exeter on 23 February 1258 and consecrated on 10 March 1258. He was ordained a priest on 10 March 1258, with both rites being performed by Boniface of Savoy, the Archbishop of Canterbury. He was enthroned at Exeter on 14 April 1258.

Maurice Powicke's opinion was that, having been trained in the royal service, Branscombe settled down to become an assiduous diocesan bishop. He faced some problems at the start of his time as bishop, for right after the death of the previous bishop, Richard Blund, a number of Blund's officials and clerks had used Blund's seal to forge letters giving away benefices as well as Blund's property. This left Branscombe with debts and administrative issues. He also continued to perform diplomatic missions for the king, as he was at Paris in 1258 and 1263. He attended a general council of the church held at Lyons in the summer of 1274.

Branscombe's register of his diocesan administration is the earliest episcopal one surviving from Exeter. He was a founder of a number of churches in his diocese, and issued sets of instructions for his cathedral church as well as others in his diocese. His last years were occupied with a dispute with Edmund the Earl of Cornwall over the earl's infringement of ecclesiastical rights.

Branscombe died on 22 July 1280 at Bishopsteignton. He was buried in Exeter Cathedral, where his tomb, with the bishop's effigy, still survives. It remained unscathed during the Exeter Blitz, being protected by sand bags.

== Citations ==
Catholic Church titles
Preceded by Richard Blund	Bishop of Exeter; 1258–1280	Succeeded by Peter Quinel
