= John of Tynemouth (canon lawyer) =

13th-century English priest and canon lawyer

- Archdeacon of Oxford
- Diocese: Diocese of Lincoln
- Installed: c. 1211
- Term ended: 1221
- Predecessor: Walter Map
- Successor: Matthew

Personal details
- Profession: canon lawyer clergyman

John of Tynemouth (died 1221) was a medieval English clergyman and canon lawyer. He was among the first teachers of canon law at what later became Oxford University, where he was by 1188. By the late 1190s John had joined the household of the Archbishop of Canterbury, Hubert Walter. Besides his position in the household, he also held a number of ecclesiastical positions, which earned him a substantial income. After Walter's death, John continued to serve as a lawyer as well as hold clerical offices. He died in 1221. A number of his writings survive.

== Legal career ==
The first mention of John occurs in 1188 when he was teaching at Oxford. This record notes that he witnessed a legal case decided by delegated judges for the Bishop of Lincoln. Along with a few other instructors, including Simon of Southwell, Honorius of Kent, and possibly Nicholas de Aquila, John was among the first securely attested legal teachers at Oxford. While at Oxford he lectured on the Decretum Gratiani and was one of the teachers of Thomas of Marlborough, later writer of the Chronicon Abbatiae de Evesham, or Chronicle of the Abbey of Evesham. It is not quite clear when John taught Thomas, but Thomas attests in his Chronicon that John was one of Thomas' teachers. Nothing else is known of John's early life or where he studied law, but presumably like other early English canon lawyers, he studied somewhere on the Continent before returning to England to teach or practice. It is possible that he served as a canon of Lincoln Cathedral during the 1190s, but this is not securely attested. By the late 1190s, John was a member of the household of Hubert Walter, the Archbishop of Canterbury. Besides Walter, another of his patrons was Walter de Coutances, the Archbishop of Rouen.

In 1203 John was employed in pleading at Rome on Hubert Walter's behalf in a case against Gerald of Wales. While returning from Rome, John was captured and held for ransom. He informed his captors that Gerald would also be passing by, thus ensuring Gerald's capture. Gerald's revenge was to inform the kidnappers that John's income was over 100 marks a year, which meant that the kidnappers required a large ransom before releasing John. John was eventually rescued by John Bellesmains, a fellow Englishman and former Archbishop of Lyon.

John held the rectorship of Upminster, Essex, by 1204. By 25 June 1206, John was holding the prebend of Langford Ecclesia in the Diocese of Lincoln; it is unclear when he relinquished this position. Sometime between 1210 and 1212 he became Archdeacon of Oxford in the Diocese of Lincoln, perhaps during 1211. His predecessor in office was the chronicler Walter Map.

In 1203 the medieval chronicler Thomas of Marlborough, who was a monk of Evesham Abbey, pleaded a case for Evesham before Hubert Walter and later, in his chronicle, he noted that John, Simon of Southwell, and Honorius of Kent, by now all canon lawyers in the archbishop's household, sided with the abbey. He also described the three men as magistri mei in scholis (roughly, "my school teachers"). Surviving evidence shows that Simon and John frequently found themselves on opposing sides of cases, which suggests a rivalry between the two over their expositions of canon law.

During the papal interdict on England during King John's reign, John of Tynemouth remained in England. He also served as a papal judge-delegate on several occasions. He died in 1221, between 25 March and August. This date of death is only recorded in a medieval work, the Annals of Dunstable, often felt to be the work of another canonist, Richard de Mores.

== Writings ==
Some of John's writings, dealing with canon law, still survive. They show him to have been steeped in canon law and quite knowledgeable. In his writings, he often cited earlier canonists or theologians as well as contemporary writers. A number of the glosses on a late-twelfth-century copy of Gratian's Decretum are ascribed to John. These take the form of notes from his lectures that were later added to the margins of copies of the Decretum. This combined work is now at Gonville and Caius College at Cambridge University, catalogued as manuscript (MS) 283/676. Another set of student notes from his lectures, this time entitled Quaestiones, survives as part of British Library MS Royal E.VII. This work includes lectures notes not only from John's classes, but from Simon and Nicholas' as well. He was also addressed as magister, testifying to his learning.

== Identification ==
Knorr writing in the Oxford Dictionary of National Biography considers that John of Tynemouth (canon lawyer) may be the same person as John of Tynemouth (geometer). Knorr regards this as possible, but unlikely.
