= Simon of Southwell =

13th-century English priest and canon lawyer

- Treasurer of Lichfield Cathedral
- Diocese: Diocese of Lichfield
- Installed: 1203

Personal details
- Profession: Canon lawyer; clergyman

Simon of Southwell (Note: Sometimes Simon of Sywell or Simon of Siwell) was a medieval English canon lawyer and canon who became treasurer of the cathedral chapter of Lichfield Cathedral. He served in the household of Hubert Walter, who was Archbishop of Canterbury from 1193 to 1205. Pope Celestine III appointed Simon as a papal judge-delegate, and Simon also served Walter in Rome on two legal cases. A number of the glosses on a late-twelfth-century copy of Gratian's Decretum are ascribed to Simon.

== Early career ==
Simon was treasurer of the cathedral chapter in 1203. He also held a prebend at Lichfield until 1209. Previously he had been a lecturer in canon law at Bologna, Paris and at Oxford. In Paris, Simon argued a case before Peter the Chanter that dealt with papal mandates, and his arguments won over Peter to his side of the discussion.

While at Oxford, Simon, along with John of Tynemouth, Honorius of Kent, and possibly Nicholas de Aquila are the first securely attested lecturers on law known for Oxford. Simon may also have studied canon law at Bologna.

== Service to Hubert Walter ==
Simon served in the household of Hubert Walter, who was Archbishop of Canterbury from 1193 to 1205. Simon served along with other canon lawyers including John of Tynemouth and Honorius of Kent. He had previously been with the household of Hugh, Bishop of Lincoln, transferring to Walter's household about 1195.

Pope Celestine III appointed Simon as a papal judge-delegate, and Simon also served Walter in Rome on two legal cases. In 1202, while Walter was on the continent, Simon was named as administrator of the diocese of Canterbury during the archbishop's absence.

In 1203, Thomas of Marlborough, who was a monk of Evesham Abbey, pleaded a case for Evesham before Archbishop Walter, and later, in his chronicle, he noted that Simon, John of Tynemouth, and Honorius, all canon lawyers from the archbishop's household, sided with the abbey. He also described the three men as magistri mei in scholis. Surviving evidence shows that Simon and John frequently found themselves on opposing sides of cases, which suggests a rivalry between the two over their expositions of canon law. Thomas appears to have studied under Simon, John, and Honorius at Oxford.

One of the cases that Simon pleaded for the archbishop was Walter's case against Gerald of Wales, who had been elected to the Bishopric of St David's in Wales. Walter opposed Gerald's appointment, and Simon, along with John of Tynemouth and another canon lawyer, were sent to Rome to argue Walter's case against Gerald.

== Teachings ==
Like John of Tynemouth, a number of the glosses on a late-twelfth-century copy of Gratian's Decretum are ascribed to Simon. These take the form of notes from his lectures that were later added to the margins of copies of the Decretum. This combined work is now at Gonville and Caius College at Cambridge University, catalogued as manuscript (MS) 283/676. Another set of student notes from his lectures, this time entitled Quaestiones, survives as part of British Library MS Royal E.VII. This work includes lecture notes not only from Simon's classes, but from John and Nicholas' as well.
