= William Briwere =

13th-century Bishop of Exeter

- Bishop of Exeter
- Appointed: c. 25 November 1223
- Predecessor: Simon de Apulia
- Successor: Richard Blund
- Other post: Precentor of Exeter Cathedral

Orders
- Consecration: 21 April 1224

Personal details
- Died: 24 October 1244
- Denomination: Catholic

William Briwere (Note: Sometimes Brewer or de Briwere) (died 1244) was a medieval Bishop of Exeter.

== Early life ==
Briwere was the nephew of William Brewer, a baron and political leader during King Henry III of England's minority. Nothing else is known of the younger Briwere's family or where he was educated. He owed the office of precentor at Exeter Cathedral to his uncle's influence, receiving that office about 1208.

Briwere was nominated around 25 November 1223 and consecrated on 21 April 1224. His elevation had been supported by Hubert de Burgh as a means of drawing Briwere's uncle over to the side of de Burgh.

== Crusading bishop ==
Briwere participated in the Sixth Crusade as a proxy for his uncle, who died before he was able to fulfill his crusading vows. The elder Briwere had taken the cross in 1189, but was excused temporarily because of his administrative duties. The nephew had released for his use 4000 marks that had been deposited with the Templars in the Holy Land by his uncle. Briwere went on the crusade with Peter des Roches, who was Bishop of Winchester. An army of other crusaders accompanied them to the East, although whether they were English or mercenaries recruited on the Continent is unclear. The contingent left from Brindisi in August 1227.

Both bishops were influential advisors to Frederick II the Holy Roman Emperor. Pope Gregory IX had ordered that no one collaborate with Frederick, who was at the time excommunicate, but both bishops ignored the papal orders and worked closely with Frederick's agents and Frederick himself. The financial resources both bishops brought were especially appreciated by the crusaders.

Both bishops witnessed the treaty on 18 February 1229 with the Sultan of Cairo that restored Jerusalem to the Christians, the Treaty of Jaffa. Briwere visited Jerusalem after this. How quickly Briwere returned to England is uncertain. Some historians have it that he was back in England by 1229. Others, however, point out that he is not attested as being in England until April 1231, and maintain that he travelled with des Roches, who dawdled in Italy for a time.

== Time in England ==
While bishop, Briwere introduced the Dominican Order into his diocese. He also set up the offices of dean and chancellor of the Exeter Cathedral chapter, allowing the chapter to elect those officers. He also issued a set of statutes for the diocese, based on those recently issued for the diocese of Salisbury.

Briwere was also employed by the king on diplomatic missions, going twice to France and also escorting Henry's sister Isabella to her marriage to the Holy Roman Emperor Frederick II in 1235.

Briwere died on 24 October 1244. He had sought permission from the pope to resign before his death, but Pope Innocent IV only granted the permission after Briwere's death.

Excavations in the quire of Exeter Cathedral in 2023 found a number of stone-lined tombs including one identified as Briwere's.

== Citations ==
Catholic Church titles
Preceded by Simon de Apulia	Bishop of Exeter; 1223–1244	Succeeded by Richard Blund
