= John the Chanter =

12th-century Bishop of Exeter

- Bishop of Exeter
- Appointed: 1184
- Term ended: 1 June 1191
- Predecessor: Bartholomew Iscanus
- Successor: Henry Marshal

Orders
- Consecration: 5 October 1186

Personal details
- Died: 1 June 1191
- Buried: Exeter Cathedral
- Denomination: Catholic

John the Chanter (died 1 June 1191) was a medieval Bishop of Exeter.

== Life ==
John's exact background is unclear, though biographer John Prince refers to him as "a native" of Devon. Liskeard lawyer Frederick Caunter states that he was born in Exeter, and was said to be a great-grandson of Condor, Earl of Cornwall. He may be the same person as the John Planeta, who was a clerk of Thomas Becket's during Becket's exile, but the connection is not proven. Antiquaries Thomas Duffus Hardy and John Le Neve say he was originally Sub-Dean of Salisbury, though all that is known for certain is that he was elderly when he was consecrated as Bishop.

According to antiquary Richard Izacke, John was installed Bishop of Exeter in 1184 and served for six years. He was consecrated on 5 October 1186. According to Caunter, "he appears to have been of good repute" and carried out a number of repairs to the cathedral during his short time as bishop. He was present at King Richard I's coronation in 1189.

John died on 1 June 1191. He was buried in an altar tomb under the south tower of Exeter Cathedral, which survives to this day. The Caunter family traditionally claim a connection to John, though Frederick Caunter considered this unlikely.

== Citations ==
Catholic Church titles
Preceded by Bartholomew Iscanus	Bishop of Exeter; 1184–1191	Succeeded by Henry Marshal
