= Walter de Coutances =

12th-century English justiciar and Archbishop of Rouen

- Archbishop of Rouen
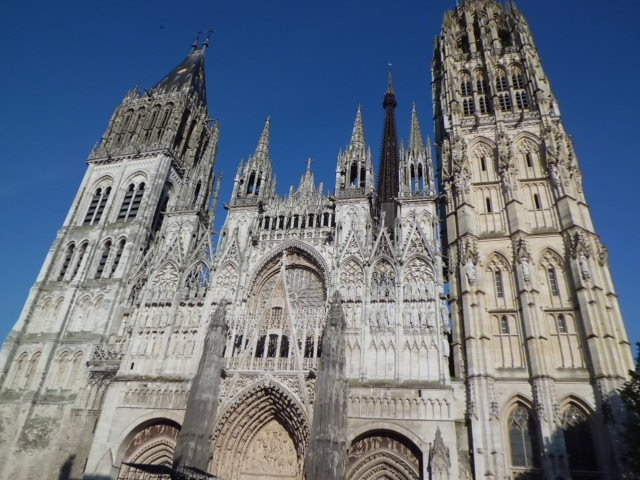
- The front of Rouen Cathedral. The left tower (except the last storey) and the side doors (except the tympans) date from the 12th century, and already existed in Coutances' lifetime.
- Appointed: 17 November 1184
- Term ended: 16 November 1207
- Predecessor: Rotrou
- Successor: Robert III Poulain
- Other posts: Bishop of Lincoln; Archdeacon of Oxford

Orders
- Ordination: 11 June 1183
- Consecration: 3 July 1183 by Richard of Dover, Archbishop of Canterbury

Personal details
- Born: Cornwall, England
- Died: 16 November 1207

Chief Justiciar of England de facto
- In office 1191–1193
- Monarch: Richard I
- Preceded by: William Longchamp
- Succeeded by: Hubert Walter

Walter de Coutances (Note: Coutances is a town of Normandy.) (Note: Also called Walter of Rouen, or Walter of Coutances.) (died 16 November 1207) was a medieval Anglo-Norman bishop of Lincoln and archbishop of Rouen. He began his royal service in the government of Henry II, serving as a vice-chancellor. He also accumulated a number of ecclesiastical offices, becoming successively canon of Rouen Cathedral, treasurer of Rouen, and archdeacon of Oxford. King Henry sent him on a number of diplomatic missions and finally rewarded him with the bishopric of Lincoln in 1183. He did not remain there long, for he was translated to Rouen in late 1184.

When Richard I, King Henry's son, became king in 1189, Coutances absolved Richard for his rebellion against his father and invested him as Duke of Normandy. He then accompanied Richard to Sicily as the king began the Third Crusade, but events in England prompted Richard to send the archbishop back to England to mediate between William Longchamp, the justiciar whom Richard had left in charge of the kingdom, and Prince John, Richard's younger brother. Coutances succeeded in securing a peace between Longchamp and John, but further actions by Longchamp led to the justiciar's expulsion from England, replaced in his role by Coutances, even though he never formally used the title. He remained in the office until late 1193, when he was summoned to Germany by the king, who was being held in captivity there. Coutances became a hostage for the final payment of Richard's ransom on the king's release in February 1194.

Coutances took no further part in the English government after returning from Germany. Instead, he became involved in Norman affairs, including a dispute with Richard over the ownership of Andely manor, an archiepiscopal property that Richard desired as a fortress. Eventually, the archbishop surrendered it to the king in return for two other manors and the seaport of Dieppe. Richard went on to build the castle of Gaillard on the former archiepiscopal manor. After Richard's death, Coutances invested Prince John as Duke of Normandy, but was forced to pay 2100 Angevin pounds to secure contested rights from the new king. After John lost control of Normandy in 1204, the archbishop did not resist the new government of King Philip II of France. Coutances died in November 1207 and was buried in his cathedral.

== Early life ==
Coutances was born in Cornwall, to Reinfrid and Gonilla. His brother was Roger fitzReinfrid, (Note: It is possible that Roger was a brother-in-law instead of a brother. Roger is occasionally called Roger FitzReinfrey.) a layman and royal justice during the reign of King Henry II of England. Although the medieval chronicler and churchman Gerald of Wales related that his friend was descended from Trojan heroes who escaped the Sack of Troy and ended up in Cornwall, that was a flattering invention on Gerald's part. Coutances' family was of the knightly class, and probably from Normandy originally.

Coutances was usually given the title of magister, which signified that he had received an education in a school; most likely, he attended the schools of Paris. Gerald of Wales said that Coutances was dedicated to learning and considered him to be a talented courtier.

== Service to King Henry ==
Coutances started his career as a clerk to King Henry II of England in the royal chamber. He probably owed the position to his brother, who was already in royal service. Coutances may have been associated with the Beaumont family faction at court before beginning work for the king, but this is not certain.

By 1169 Coutances held a canonry in Rouen Cathedral. During the 1170s a group of royal clerks rose to prominence, among them Coutances, Walter Map, Ralph Diceto, John of Oxford, Richard of Ilchester, and Geoffrey Ridel. Coutances was the chaplain to Henry the Young King, eldest living son of King Henry, but when the younger Henry rebelled against his father in 1173, Coutances returned to King Henry's service. He became Archdeacon of Oxford, perhaps by 1173, certainly by 14 March 1176. He was named vice-chancellor when Ralph de Warneville became Chancellor of England, which occurred in 1173. In 1176 and 1177, King Henry sent Coutances on diplomatic missions to Flanders and the French royal court. Arnulf, the Bishop of Lisieux, alleged that Henry allowed Coutances to use all the administrative machinery of Normandy to drive Arnulf from his diocese, so that Coutances might become bishop there. This happened in early 1178, but the only real evidence for this effort on Coutances' part comes from Arnulf's correspondence, and as Coutances was back in England by July 1178, it does not appear that the attempt was a sustained one.

On his return to England, Coutances was given custody of the abbeys of Wilton and Ramsey, which were being held by King Henry pending the election of new abbots. He thus acquired the right to collect the abbeys' revenues in the name of the king, who had the regalian rights to that income. In 1180, Henry sent Coutances to France on another diplomatic mission. In February 1182, Coutances witnessed King Henry II's will, made before the king travelled to Normandy.

== Bishop of Lincoln and Archbishop of Rouen ==
Coutances was elected to the see of Lincoln on 8 May 1183, selected by King Henry over three other candidates. He was ordained a priest on 11 June 1183 and consecrated bishop on 3 July 1183 at Angers by Richard of Dover, the Archbishop of Canterbury. He was enthroned at Lincoln Cathedral on 11 December 1183. While at Lincoln, Coutances took part in the election of Baldwin of Forde as the new Archbishop of Canterbury, which took place at a council held in Westminster in 1184. Writing about Coutances' time at Lincoln, Gerald of Wales accused the bishop of increasing the debt of the diocese of Lincoln and of squandering its resources. Coutances helped the schools in the city of Lincoln, acting as the patron for scholars such as John of Tynemouth and Simon of Southwell.

On 17 November 1184, Coutances was translated to the diocese of Rouen, becoming Archbishop of Rouen. The original election to Rouen had taken place in the summer. King Henry had initially rejected the Rouen cathedral chapter's nominees and put forward three English bishops as the royal candidates. The king also indicated his preference that Coutances be elected, a choice that was confirmed by the pope in November. Coutances hesitated about the translation to Rouen, as the see there was poorer than Lincoln, but as an archbishopric rather than a bishopric, it was of a higher status. The medieval chronicler William of Newburgh wrote that eventually Coutances' ambition overcame his greed, and he agreed to the translation. He was received at Rouen on 3 March 1185. Coutances remained in Henry's service, however, and continued to attend the royal court frequently. During the final 10 years of Henry's reign, only Ranulf de Glanville witnessed more royal charters, and only William de Humez, the constable, equalled the 16 charters that Coutances witnessed.

In the later part of 1186, after the death of King Henry's son Geoffrey—who was Duke of Brittany—King Philip II of France demanded that Geoffrey's daughters be placed in the French king's custody, and that the duchy of Brittany, which Geoffrey had ruled in right of his wife, be surrendered into French royal custody. Coutances was one of the negotiators sent by King Henry to secure a settlement, but they had to settle for a temporary truce. In January 1188, Coutances took the cross when he pledged to go on Crusade along with King Henry and King Philip of France.

At Whitsun in 1189, Coutances was a member of a commission appointed by the papal legate John of Anagni to arbitrate the dispute between King Henry II of England and his son, Richard, who King Philip II of France supported. Henry and Richard's conflict stemmed from Richard's desire to secure his inheritance to the throne of England, which he believed his father was trying to give to his youngest brother, John. The commission met near Le Mans. Richard and Philip insisted that Richard should be married to Philip's sister Alice, that Henry name Richard as Henry's heir, and that Richard's youngest brother John, should go on crusade with Richard. Henry rejected those terms, and neither Philip nor Richard would negotiate, even under the legate's threat of an interdict on France.

== Service to King Richard ==
Shortly after Richard took the throne, he sought absolution for his sins in rebelling against his father from Baldwin of Forde and Coutances. The two archbishops absolved Richard in a ceremony in Sées. Coutances also invested Richard as Duke of Normandy in a ceremony held in Rouen, before accompanying Richard to England, where he participated in the new king's coronation, on 3 September 1189.

In 1189, Coutances held an ecclesiastical synod which legislated, among other things, that the clergy should not hold secular offices, even though Coutances himself had held and continued to hold such offices. On 9 November 1189 Richard appointed Coutances to a commission tasked with deciding the dispute between Baldwin of Forde and the monks of his cathedral chapter over Baldwin's plan to create a church dedicated to Thomas Becket, the murdered Archbishop of Canterbury, and to staff this church not with monks, but with canons. The monks of Canterbury Cathedral objected to Baldwin's plan, fearing that it was part of a plot to transfer the right of election from the monastic cathedral chapter to the new church's canons. Sitting on the commission with Coutances were Hugh de Puiset, the Bishop of Durham, Godfrey de Lucy, the Bishop of Winchester, Hubert Walter, the Bishop of Salisbury, Peter de Leia, the Bishop of St David's, Richard fitzNigel, the Bishop-elect of London, William Longchamp, the Bishop-elect of Ely, and some abbots. The commission travelled to Canterbury, and on 29 November 1189, managed to secure a compromise between the parties, which lasted until Hubert Walter, by then Archbishop of Canterbury, revived the plan. In the compromise, Baldwin agreed to give up the idea of a new monastic foundation around Canterbury and the monks agreed to submit to the archbishop's authority.

When Richard left England in late 1189, the archbishop accompanied him to Normandy and then to Sicily, where Richard began the Third Crusade. In October 1190, Coutances was one of the negotiators between the city of Messina and the crusaders, and later was a guarantor of the peace treaty between King Richard and Tancred, the King of Sicily. The archbishop was also appointed one of the treasurers of the crusading army.

While Richard was still in Sicily, word reached the king of the disputes between William Longchamp, whom Richard had left in England, and John, Richard's younger brother. On 2 April 1191, Richard sent Coutances back from Sicily to England. The archbishop landed in England on 27 June, after a short detour to Rome, where Coutances received a release from his crusading vow. He had a number of royal documents authorising him to settle the disputes, and on 28 July, a settlement was reached that left Longchamp in control, although John still retained sufficient power to make Longchamp's grip on the government somewhat insecure. In September, however, Longchamp imprisoned Richard's bastard half-brother, Geoffrey, Archbishop of York, who was attempting to return to England after having been banished by the king. The imprisonment renewed memories of the murder of Thomas Becket almost 20 years earlier, and Geoffrey was quickly released. Longchamp was brought to a council, headed by Coutances and a number of the clerical and lay lords of England, which took place on 5 October 1191 at Loddon Bridge on the River Thames. Longchamp was deposed and exiled, largely because Coutances had a royal document ordering the magnates to obey Coutances' if the archbishop's advice was resisted by Longchamp, which it had been. Although the medieval chronicler Richard of Devizes accused Coutances of duplicity, and of trying to play both sides against the other, the evidence suggests that Coutances was genuinely trying to solve the dispute in the king's interest. Longchamp fled to Normandy, and Coutances excommunicated him.

== Acting Justiciar ==
After Longchamp's exile, Coutances was named head of a council of regency, which is sometimes equated to the post of Chief Justiciar, although he never referred to himself as such nor is he titled that in any official document. Most modern historians, however, name him as justiciar. He held that power until about 25 December 1193, when Hubert Walter was appointed Justiciar.

Coutances had long experience in the chancery, but little experience with judicial matters. Most of his efforts while in the justiciarship were centred on raising Richard's ransom. As evidence of this emphasis on raising money, Coutances sent out few itinerant justices during his time in power. Six groups of justices were sent out in 1192, but in 1193, none were sent out, and even the justices based in Westminster held few sessions. Of those justices appointed, like his predecessor in the justiciarship, Coutances used justices from a wide range of backgrounds, and many of those sent out on itinerant rounds were local to the area, rather than the increasingly professional justices used under Coutances' successor Hubert Walter. The justiciarship during this period was less connected to justice and was more closely tied to the Exchequer, or treasury of England, and most of the power in the office derived from its control of the Exchequer.

A new note in Coutances' administration was his custom of issuing writs not in his own name, as had previously been the practice, but in the king's name. The archbishop also stressed that his decisions were made with the advice and consent of many of the leading nobles of the realm, as well as the barons of the Exchequer. This was a reaction against Longchamp's authoritarian method of government.

The archbishop supervised the election of a new Archbishop of Canterbury, as Baldwin of Forde had died while on Crusade in 1190. Although both Longchamp and Coutances were considered as possible candidates and rivals for the see, the cathedral chapter of Canterbury elected the Bishop of Bath, Reginald fitzJocelin, in November 1191. Reginald died a month later, and the see remained vacant until March 1193, when the king's candidate, Hubert Walter, was elected.

During 1191, the citizens of the city of London managed to acquire from Coutances and Prince John the recognition that the city was self-governing, something they had been attempting to secure for a number of years. This, however, was not the grant of a complete charter of liberties, which did not occur until 1199. In February 1193, Coutances summoned a council to Oxford, to address problems of administration and defence after the recently received news of Richard's captivity in Germany. The council also took oaths of fealty to Richard. Prince John, however, hearing that Richard was in captivity, immediately went to France and swore homage to King Philip for Richard's lands, and then returned to England and raised a rebellion. Coutances proceeded to besiege Windsor Castle, which was held by Prince John's men. When John heard that Richard was going to be freed, he left England and went to France.

In February 1194, Coutances was in Germany, at the court of the German emperor, along with Longchamp, who brought letters to Richard, still in captivity. On 4 February, Coutances became a hostage to the German emperor as surety for the payment of the outstanding portion of Richard's ransom, and the king was released. The king never paid the final instalment of his ransom, and the archbishop had to pay 10,000 marks for his own release. From that point onwards, Coutances was no longer involved with English politics or government and spent the rest of his career on Norman affairs. His record of charter witnessing bears this out; between 1189 and 1194, Coutances was among the most prolific of the witnesses to the king's English charters, but not after 1194.

== Return to Normandy ==
Coutances returned to Normandy, and in December 1195, attempted to secure compensation for the losses his archdiocese had sustained in the warfare between King Richard and King Phillip. He sought compensation from both kings but obtained no satisfaction, and felt so ill-treated by the kings that he abandoned his see. The English and the French kings had required clergymen to guarantee the January 1196 Treaty of Louviers that the two kings arranged for themselves, with Richard nominating Coutances as his surety, or guarantor that the conditions of the treaty would be fulfilled. Part of the treaty laid out that if the archbishop laid an interdict or excommunicated anyone in the lands of King Philip or any subject of King Richard in the archdiocese of Rouen, then the archiepiscopal manor of Andeli should be forfeit to either king until after a special tribunal had determined if the archbishop's punishment was valid.

When Coutances returned to his diocese in July 1196, he found that the king had seized the manor of Andely independently of the treaty provisions, and when the archbishop refused to relinquish it to the king, Richard began to fortify the manor. He also built a castle there, now Château Gaillard. On 7 November 1196, Coutances set off for Rome, to protest the seizure to the pope. Richard sent a royal embassy, and eventually a settlement was reached. The archbishop was ordered to remove the interdict he had placed on the duchy, and in return for the manor received two others and the seaport of Dieppe. The various lands that Coutances' received in exchange for Andely were worth £1,405 a year. This episode marked the end of Coutances' service to the Angevin kings; for the rest of his life the archbishop focused on protecting and guarding the archiepiscopal properties and rights.

== Service to King John ==
When Richard died on 6 April 1199, the archbishop invested Richard's youngest brother John as duke of Normandy on 25 April 1199. At the ceremony, John pledged to protect the Norman church, and soon afterwards confirmed the grant of Dieppe and the other manors to the archdiocese. John contested the right of the archbishop to some jurisdictional rights, however, as well as forest rights, forcing Coutances to pay 2,100 Angevin pounds to secure most of the contested rights. In May 1200, Coutances was involved in the peace treaty of Le Goulet between King John and King Philip of France, but took no active part in the Angevin defence of Normandy.

In September 1201, one of Coutances' suffragan bishops, Lisiard, the Bishop of Sées died. King John objected when the cathedral chapter attempted to elect one of their own members as his successor. Coutances refused to recognise the result of the election, and the chapter divided into two parties, one favouring the elected chapter member, the other party another choice. Both parties appealed to the papacy, which eventually approved of the election of the Archdeacon of Sées, Silvester. Coutances had the right to consecrate the bishop; however, he refused to do so, arguing that the king's choice had been disregarded. Pope Innocent III then ordered another Norman archbishop to consecrate Silvester, but the king refused to allow Silvester to take possession of his see. This led Innocent to order Normandy laid under an interdict, but eventually Silvester was allowed to take possession of Sées.

In May 1202, Pope Innocent III wrote to Coutances, urging him to impose religious punishments on any rebels against King John's rule in the duchy of Normandy. When John lost the duchy in 1204, Coutances did not resist the government of King Philip II, although he did not make his complete peace with Philip until March 1207. In 1206/07, Coutances, along with his suffragan bishops, petitioned Philip for special legal procedures relating to patronage, which Philip granted.

== As archbishop ==
Although Coutances was absent from Rouen for most of the period between 1190 and 1194, he remained an active archbishop. He secured the continued immunity of clergy from secular jurisdiction and supervised the administration of the archdiocese. He began the custom of keeping records in registers of episcopal judgements from about 1200, and he appointed the first officials of Rouen. He also oversaw the rebuilding of Rouen Cathedral, which had begun in 1155, and restarted the work after a fire in 1200. His relations with his cathedral chapter were evidently excellent, as they remembered him as "a magnificent benefactor of the church of Rouen".

== Death and legacy ==
Coutances died on 16 November 1207 and was buried at Rouen Cathedral, (Note: His death was commemorated on 14 November at Beaulieu and on 20 November at St. Evroul.) in the chapel of Saints Peter and Paul. The inventory of his personal possessions made after his death included a large number of jewels and vestments. He also owned a large library, which contained not only religious works but also legal texts on canon law and works of classical authors such as Juvenal and Ovid.

Coutances' nephew, John of Coutances, became Archdeacon of Oxford and Dean of Rouen under Walter's influence, and later Bishop of Worcester. (Note: The election of John to Worcester in 1196 may have been an attempt by King Richard to mend his relationship with the archbishop, which had been damaged during the dispute over Andali.) Other nephews were William, successively a canon at Lincoln Cathedral and an archdeacon at Rouen, and Richard, also an archdeacon at Rouen.

The historian John Gillingham called Coutances "one of the great fixers" of his time. Two other historians have argued that it was probably Coutances' judgement and stability that persuaded the king to trust him. The medieval poet John of Hauville dedicated a satirical poem in 1184 to Coutances called Architrenius. It was on the tribulations of a poor scholar.

== Citations ==
Political offices
Preceded by William Longchamp	Chief Justiciar de facto 1191–1193	Succeeded by Hubert Walter
Catholic Church titles
Preceded by Geoffrey Plantagenet	Bishop of Lincoln; 1183–1184	Succeeded by Hugh of Avalon
Preceded by Rotrou	Archbishop of Rouen; 1184–1207	Succeeded by Robert III Poulain
