= John of Tynemouth (geometer) =

13th-century English mathematician

John of Tynemouth was a 13th-century mathematician and geometer. Little is known of John's background, but he authored De curvis superficiebus or Liber de curvis superficiebus Archimenidis, a tract about Archimedes' measurements of spheres. This is an important work in the history of medieval geometry, as it helped transmit Archimedes' ideas to other medieval scholars. The work itself follows closely Archimedes' own reasoning, but with enough differences to lead modern historians to believe that John's work was dependent on a Greek text from late antiquity.

De curvis survives in over 12 manuscripts, and was used by a number of other medieval scholars, including Robert Grosseteste, Jordanus de Nemore, Gerard of Brussels, and Roger Bacon.

Certain stylistic choices in De curvis suggest that John was also responsible for a number of other works:

- De circulo quadrando, a revision of another of Archimedes' works, the De quadratura circuli, which is now in Florence at the Biblioteca Nazionale;
- De quadratura circuli;
- De figuris isoperimetris, now in Oxford University's Bodleian Library as manuscript Digby 174;
- a paraphrase of Euclid's Elements from the translation of Adelard of Bath, later cited by Roger Bacon;
- Quaelibet media proportionalia.

Wilbur Knorr, writing in the Oxford Dictionary of National Biography, considers the idea that the John of Tynemouth who wrote these works could be the same person as the canon lawyer John of Tynemouth, who died in 1221. Knorr regards this as possible, but unlikely.
