= Philip of Poitou =

12th- and 13th-century Bishop of Durham

- Bishop of Durham
- Elected: January 1196
- Appointed: November 1195
- Predecessor: Hugh de Puiset
- Successor: Richard Poore
- Other post: Archdeacon of Canterbury

Orders
- Ordination: 15 June 1196
- Consecration: 20 April 1197 by Pope Innocent III

Personal details
- Died: 22 April 1208
- Denomination: Roman Catholic

Philip of Poitou (sometimes Philip of Poitiers; died 22 April 1208) was Bishop of Durham from 1197 to 1208, and prior to this Archdeacon of Canterbury.

== Early life ==
Philip's origins and early life are unknown, although it is believed he may have had a university education. The first records of him are in 1191, when he was accompanying Richard I on the Third Crusade, in documents relating to Richard's marriage on Cyprus. Philip was with Richard's party when the king was captured in Germany. He was appointed Archdeacon of Canterbury prior to March 1194 by Richard I, having previously been a royal clerk. An attempt was made to appoint him as Dean of York, but political factors prevented this.

== Bishop ==
Philip was appointed as Bishop of Durham in November 1195. He was formally elected by the chapter in January 1196. The pope confirmed the election on 13 April 1196, and he was ordained a priest on 15 June 1196. On 20 April 1197 he was finally consecrated as bishop, by the pope in Rome. Prior to his consecration, he obtained a licence to operate a mint in Durham, and installed his nephew Aimeric (or Aimery) as the Archdeacon of both Durham and Carlisle.

Philip, along with Wiliam de Rupierre, Bishop of Lisieux, went to Rome in the early part of 1197 to argue before Pope Celestine III about contested lands in France. It was in the course of this successful negotiation that the pope consecrated him as bishop. In 1198 Philip was sent to Germany to attend the election of a successor to Emperor Henry VI.

Philip was present at the coronation of King John in 1199, and attempted to protest the fact that the coronation took place without the Archbishop of York. After the coronation, he was employed by John on diplomacy with Scotland. In 1201 he went on pilgrimage to Santiago de Compostela. After his return, he was involved in the resolution of the dower rights of Richard's queen, Berengaria of Navarre, but afterwards was not at the king's court for almost three years.

In 1207, Philip quarrelled with King John over the right of John to tax tenants of the Church. Philip denied that John had such a right, but, along with Archbishop Geoffrey of York, had his lands confiscated. Both Geoffrey and Philip went to the court of the king and begged to be forgiven. Philip had to pay a fine for forgiveness.

As bishop, Philip quarreled with the monks of his church over the right of the bishop to name clergy to serve churches. At one point, the monks were besieged in the cathedral, and the prior of the monks was excommunicated. Some sources blame the bishop's nephew Aimeric for fanning the flames of the quarrel, but Philip also violently disputed the monks' side. Eventually a settlement was reached.

== Death and legacy ==
Philip died on 22 April 1208. It is said the monks refused him a Christian burial, his body ending up in an obscure grave with no religious ceremony. However, his gravestone is recorded in the chapter-house.

== Citations ==
Catholic Church titles
Preceded by Hugh de Puiset	Bishop of Durham; 1195–1208	Succeeded by Richard Poore
