= Hugh Murdac =

12th-century English clergyman

- Archdeacon of Cleveland
- Church: Catholic
- In office: 1201
- Successor: William of Ely
- Previous post(s): Canon of York Minster; Prebend of Driffield

Hugh Murdac was an English clergyman and canon of York Minster in the 12th and 13th centuries.

Murdac was the nephew of Henry Murdac, the Archbishop of York. Hugh was a canon of the cathedral chapter of York Minster before 1153, holding the prebend of Driffield. He last occurs as a simple canon in 1198. In 1201 he was elected Archdeacon of Cleveland by the cathedral chapter but his election was opposed by Geoffrey, the archbishop. Geoffrey excommunicated Murdac and appointed William of Ely instead.

Geoffrey and Murdac clashed at least one other time. Geoffrey had confiscated the revenues of a number of the officials of the cathedral chapter. These included Burchard du Puiset - Treasurer, Henry Marshal - Dean of York, Peter de Ros - Archdeacon of Carlisle, and another canon, Adam of Thornover. Geoffrey refused to restore the incomes unless the offenders came barefoot into York Minster and begged for the archbishop's forgiveness. This all but Marshal did and they had their official revenues restored.

Murdac is probably the same person as a king's clerk who occurs in documents from 1178, 1179, and 1184. The occurrence in 1179 is as a royal justice.

Murdac founded the priory of St Andrew at York.
