= Henry Marshal (bishop of Exeter) =

12th and 13th-century Bishop of Exeter

- Bishop of Exeter
- Appointed: c. 10 February 1194
- Term ended: 24/27 October 1206
- Predecessor: John the Chanter
- Successor: Simon de Apulia
- Other post: Dean of York

Orders
- Consecration: c. 28 March 1194

Personal details
- Died: 24/27 October 1206
- Buried: Exeter Cathedral
- Denomination: Catholic
- Parents: John Marshal and Sybil of Salisbury

Henry Marshal (died 24/27 October 1206) was a medieval Dean of York and Bishop of Exeter. He was a younger son of John Marshal and his wife Sybilla of Salisbury, and thus a younger brother of William Marshal and a member of the Marshal family.

== Dean of York ==
Henry was appointed Dean of York on 16 September 1189. He may not have been originally intended for the church, as he was not even in subdiaconal orders when nominated Dean of York, at which time he would probably have been in his thirties. In fact, on the same day he was nominated, he was ordained deacon and subdeacon.

Henry's appointment angered Geoffrey, Archbishop of York. When Henry came to York, he was installed as a canon, because only the archbishop had the right to install him dean. However, when Archbishop Geoffrey arrived, he also refused to install him, because he was himself waiting for the confirmation of his election by the Pope. As a result, on 5 December, Henry, along with treasurer Bouchard du Puiset, was among the ones to unsuccessfully appeal to the Pope against Geoffrey's election. After Geoffrey's position was confirmed, he, under request of his brother king Richard the Lionheart, confirmed the offices of dean and treasurer to Henry and Bouchard. The stability of the situation, however, did not last long, and on 5 January 1190 the two were excommunicated by Geoffrey after a heated argument.

== Bishop of Exeter ==
In February 1194, when Richard the Lionheart returned to England from the third crusade, an election was held to nominate a new bishop of Exeter, a title vacant since 1191. Richard chose Henry for the position, most likely because he was the brother of William Marshal, who had defended his interests. Hubert Walter, Richard's regent and Archbishop of Canterbury, would have also approved the election as he and Henry came from the same circle. Marshal was nominated about 10 February 1194 and consecrated about 28 March 1194. When king John Lackland succeeded Richard, Henry paid 300 marks for tax exemption and for the confirmation of his properties.

Even if his appointment was forced, Henry was to be considered a good college man. He financed the construction of the cathedral church, he gifted vestments and ornaments and patronized different men. He was generous to the canons, and settled a jurisdictional dispute with the archdeacon of Exeter in their favour. He built different chapels and had connections with William Brewer, who founded different abbeys. Henry also supposedly finished the construction of Exeter Cathedral.

Henry Marshal died in 1206, on 24/27 October. His tomb in Exeter Cathedral is still extant and has the bishop's effigy on it.

== Citations ==
Catholic Church titles
Preceded by John the Chanter	Bishop of Exeter; 1194–1206	Succeeded by Simon de Apulia
