= Geoffrey (archbishop of York) =

Illegitimate son of Henry II (c.1152–1212)

- Archbishop of York
- Appointed: August 1189
- Term ended: 12 December 1212
- Predecessor: Roger de Pont L'Évêque
- Successor: Walter de Gray
- Other posts: Bishop of Lincoln-elect; Archdeacon of Lincoln

Orders
- Ordination: 23 September 1189
- Consecration: 18 August 1191 by Bartholomew, the Archbishop of Tours

Personal details
- Born: c. 1152
- Died: 12 December 1212 Grandmont, Normandy
- Buried: Notre Dame du Parc, Rouen, Seine-Maritime, France
- Parents: Henry II of England; Ykenai (possibly)

Lord Chancellor
- In office 1181–1189
- Monarch: Henry II
- Preceded by: Ralph de Warneville
- Succeeded by: William Longchamp

Geoffrey (Note: He was sometimes called Geoffrey Plantagenet, fitzPlantagenet, or fitzRoy.) (c. 1152 – 12 December 1212) was an illegitimate son of King Henry II of England who became bishop-elect of Lincoln and archbishop of York. The identity of his mother is uncertain, but she may have been named Ykenai. Geoffrey held several minor clerical offices before becoming Bishop of Lincoln in 1173, though he was not ordained as a priest until 1189. In 1173–1174, he led a campaign in northern England to help put down a rebellion by his legitimate half-brothers; this campaign led to the capture of William, King of Scots. By 1182, Pope Lucius III had ordered that Geoffrey either resign Lincoln or be consecrated as bishop; he chose to resign and became chancellor instead. He was the only one of Henry II's sons present at the king's death.

Geoffrey's half-brother Richard I nominated him archbishop of York after succeeding to the throne of England, probably to force him to become a priest and thus eliminate a potential rival for the throne. After some dispute, Geoffrey was consecrated archbishop in 1191. He soon became embroiled in a conflict with William Longchamp, Richard's regent in England, after being detained at Dover on his return to England following his consecration in France. Geoffrey claimed sanctuary in the town, but he was seized by agents of Longchamp and briefly imprisoned in Dover Castle. Subsequently, a council of magnates ordered Longchamp out of office, and Geoffrey was able to proceed to his archdiocese. The archbishop spent much of his archiepiscopate in various disputes with his half-brothers: first Richard and then John, who succeeded to the English throne in 1199. Geoffrey also quarrelled with his suffragan bishops, his cathedral chapter, and other clergy in his diocese. His last quarrel with John was in 1207, when the archbishop refused to allow the collection of a tax and was driven into exile in France. He died there five years later.

== Early life ==
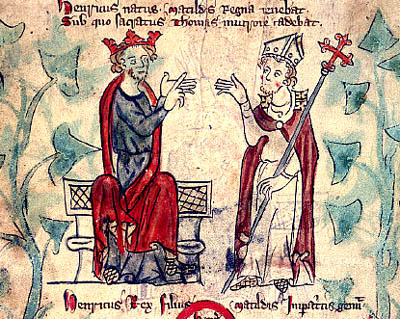
Henry II with Thomas Becket, from a 13th-century illuminated manuscript

Geoffrey was probably born in about 1152, before his father Henry, later Henry II of England, married Eleanor of Aquitaine, (Note: Henry also held the duchies of Normandy and Aquitaine and the counties of Maine, Touraine and Anjou in France. These lands were central to Henry's power and he spent much time outside England in his continental possessions. King Richard I, who succeeded Henry in 1189, also spent most of his time outside England. Although John, Richard's younger brother who became king in 1199, lost Normandy, he still retained the other possessions and continued to spend much time on the continent.) and was likely named after his paternal grandfather, Geoffrey of Anjou. Although he is often given the surname "Plantagenet" in modern histories, that name was not in use during his lifetime. The date of his birth is determined by statements of Gerald of Wales that he was barely 20 when elected bishop in 1173, and by the fact that he was about 40 when consecrated archbishop in 1191. His mother's identity is unclear. The medieval chronicler Walter Map claimed she was a whore named Ykenai, and that he was not actually Henry's son. (Note: Her name is sometimes spelled Hikenai.) This is the only contemporary source that gives her name, and as Map was hostile to Geoffrey, the information must be judged carefully. Instead, Ykenai may have been a daughter of a knight. (Note: Other speculations on her background have included her being a Welsh hostage at Henry's court or that she was either a servant or a daughter of one of the royal servants, but not of noble blood.) Another possibility for Geoffrey's mother is Rosamund Clifford, but most of the evidence for this is circumstantial. (Note: In 1191 Geoffrey was irate at the destruction of Rosamund's shrine at Godstow Abbey. Geoffrey was also fond of Godstow for his entire life, and while archbishop attempted to add Clementhorpe Priory to the endowment of Godstow. Another piece of circumstantial evidence is the name Map gives for Geoffrey's mother. Ykenai may be derived from Acquigny, and Acquigny Castle was likely held by members of the Clifford family. Further, William Longespée, the son of another reputed child of Rosamund, tried to claim land near Akeny in 1228.) It is assumed that Geoffrey was the eldest of Henry's children, legitimate or illegitimate. (Note: Geoffrey should not be confused with Henry's legitimate son Geoffrey, Duke of Brittany, who was born in 1158 and died in 1186.)

Henry II had eight children from his marriage to Eleanor of Aquitaine, including the future kings Richard and John. Geoffrey was brought up with his father's legitimate children. There is no evidence that Henry tried to deny Geoffrey's paternity, although Walter Map said that Henry's acknowledgment was done "improperly and with little discretion". Geoffrey had a brother named Peter, who appears to have been his maternal half-brother, as Peter is generally considered unlikely to have been Henry's son. (Note: Peter is called Geoffrey's "half-brother" by the historian Diana Greenway, but she does not state whether or not he was Geoffrey's maternal or paternal half-brother. Peter is not mentioned by Henry's biographer as a son of the king.)

Geoffrey was Archdeacon of Lincoln in the diocese of Lincoln by September 1171, and probably retained that office until he was confirmed as bishop-elect in 1175. He also held a prebend, an income from land owned by a cathedral chapter, in the diocese of London, but there is little evidence that he executed the duties of either office. There are some indications that he studied canon law at a school in Northampton, and that he taught in Paris during the early 1170s. He also acted as a papal judge-delegate at that time. Pope Alexander III initially refused to confirm Geoffrey's selection as Bishop of Lincoln in about May 1173, prompting Geoffrey to travel to Rome in October 1174 to secure confirmation of this office. He was confirmed in the office of bishop by July 1175, but he was not ordained at that time, as he was under the canonical age for holding a bishopric. Geoffrey's youth was one of Alexander's objections to Geoffrey's election, and the pope only confirmed the office under duress. Another potential problem was Geoffrey's illegitimacy, which normally disbarred a person from holding ecclesiastical office, but that was dealt with by the granting of a papal dispensation.

In 1173 and early 1174 Geoffrey fought a military campaign in northern England in support of his father's attempts to subdue the Scots, who were supporting the rebellion by Geoffrey's legitimate half-brothers against their father. The campaign resulted in the capture of William the Lion, the King of Scots, at the Battle of Alnwick and also helped to compel Hugh du Puiset, the Bishop of Durham, to pledge fealty to Henry II. During the campaign, Geoffrey captured several castles held by Roger Mowbray, a supporter of the Scottish king. It was after this campaign that Henry said of Geoffrey "My other sons are the real bastards. ... This is the only one who's proved himself legitimate!" After Geoffrey was confirmed as bishop by Pope Alexander in 1175, the bishop-elect made a ceremonial visit to Lincoln on 1 August 1175. He subsequently went to study at Tours, where he probably befriended Peter of Blois, a medieval poet and diplomat who dedicated a later work on St Wilfrid to Geoffrey. The bishop-elect made several gifts to the cathedral at Lincoln, including two bells for the bell tower. While Geoffrey was the bishop-elect at Lincoln, it appears that Adam, Bishop of St Asaph, carried out the episcopal duties in the diocese of Lincoln, as Geoffrey had not been consecrated and was unable to perform those functions. Nevertheless, he managed to recover some lands of the diocese that had been lost as well as redeeming pawned ecclesiastical items. Although he aided the finances of his diocese with these recoveries, in 1180 he taxed his diocese heavily enough to earn him a rebuke from his father. In 1181 Pope Lucius III became concerned that Geoffrey was never going to be ordained or consecrated, and demanded that the bishop-elect's position be regularised, either through consecration as bishop or through resignation.

== Chancellor ==
Geoffrey formally resigned the see of Lincoln on 6 January 1182, at Marlborough in England, rather than be ordained as Pope Lucius III had ordered. Henry had named him Chancellor of England in 1181, after Geoffrey indicated he was going to resign the bishopric in February 1181. (Note: This took the form of a ceremony of resignation, although the formal date of his resignation was not until the second ceremony in England in 1182.) Although Geoffrey resigned the episcopal office, he continued to hold benefices in plurality, which was normally contrary to canon law. These offices included the Treasurer of York from 1182, the Archdeaconry of Rouen from 1183, and probably the Archdeaconry of East Riding. Henry also gave him two continental castles, one in Anjou and one in Touraine, along with lands in England and Normandy worth 1000 marks a year. Although Geoffrey held the office of Chancellor, he appears in only few documents, mainly between 1182 and 1185. After 1185, he does not appear in any contemporary documents until 1187, and it is possible that he spent some time outside his father's domains. Peter of Blois wrote that several monarchs considered Geoffrey as a possible successor for their kingdoms in Italy or the Holy Land, and that he was actually offered the throne of Jerusalem by Heraclius, the Patriarch of Jerusalem. It is possible that Geoffrey's non-appearance in documents was due to his absence from his father's domains in pursuit of these ambitions. During Geoffrey's term of office as Chancellor, Walter de Coutances served as his "seal-keeper"; the need for someone to perform this function adds further evidence to the likelihood that Geoffrey's time as Chancellor was spent on unrelated duties for his father. William Longchamp fulfilled the same assistant role for the archdeaconry at Rouen.

Following the declaration of war on Henry by Prince Richard and King Philip II of France in 1187, Geoffrey was given command of a quarter of the English royal army. He and his father were driven from Le Mans, Henry's birthplace, in 1189. Geoffrey did not attend the subsequent conference at which Henry submitted to Philip immediately before Henry's death, unwilling to witness his father's humiliation, but he did help nurse him during his final days. Henry made a bedside wish that Geoffrey be made either Archbishop of York or Bishop of Winchester, and Geoffrey used his father's seal to make appointments to York after Henry's death. Geoffrey then escorted Henry's body to Fontevrault Abbey for burial. He was the only one of Henry II's sons present at his death.

== Archbishop ==
=== First difficulties ===
Richard named Geoffrey Archbishop of York on 20 July 1189, within days of taking the throne; the formal election took place on 10 August. What happened with the vacant archbishopric of York after Richard took the throne, and why, as well as the exact chronology of events, is complicated by the contradictory nature of the main contemporary accounts. Gerald of Wales states that Geoffrey was reluctant to accept York, but another chronicler, Benedict of Peterborough relates that Geoffrey quickly took control of the archiepiscopal estates. However the election occurred, Geoffrey's consecration did not take place until much later, and soon after his election, he either resigned or was stripped of his office of Chancellor. A further complication was that the cathedral chapter had earlier elected the Dean of York, Hubert Walter, as archbishop.

Richard probably gave York to Geoffrey in the hope of forcing him to become a full priest, and thus eliminate a potential rival for the throne. Richard also required Geoffrey to swear that he would remain outside England for three years during the time Richard expected to be out of the country on crusade. The king subsequently released Geoffrey from the oath, the initial swearing of which was apparently another of Richard's efforts to keep Geoffrey's possible ambitions towards the English throne in check. But the cathedral chapter at York disputed Geoffrey's appointment, claiming that because the Dean of York, Hubert Walter, and some others of the chapter had not been present, the election was invalid. Walter's election to York was supported by Richard's mother, Eleanor, whom a chronicler claimed hated Geoffrey as the product of one of her husband's affairs. Richard consequently retained his control over the estates of the archbishopric, and did not confirm the election until a council held at Pipewell on 16 September. At that council Richard also appointed three men to offices within the diocese of York: he made Henry Marshal the dean; Burchard du Puiset, a relative of Hugh du Puiset, (Note: Burchard is called variously the nephew or the son of Hugh by modern historians.) became treasurer; and Roger of London the abbot of Selby Abbey. Geoffrey objected to these appointments, and as a result, his estates were confiscated by the king until he submitted and became a priest. The historians Ralph Turner and Richard Heiser speculate that Richard's strategy in making these appointments was to keep Geoffrey distracted by problems within his diocese, and thus unable to challenge for the English throne. The two historians also suggest that Richard may have been making an example of Geoffrey, in a demonstration that he could be harsh even with his own relatives.

Geoffrey's ordination as a priest took place at Southwell on 23 September 1189, in a ceremony performed by John, the Bishop of Whithorn. Geoffrey then went to York, but until his election was ratified by the pope, he refused to allow Burchard to take up his office. This stance was supported by most of the York cathedral chapter. Geoffrey was then sent by Richard to escort William the Lion from Scotland to Canterbury. It was at Canterbury that papal assent to Geoffrey's election was secured in December, when Giovanni d'Anagni, the papal legate, not only confirmed the election, but rejected the various appeals made by the cathedral chapter against Geoffrey. But the king forced Geoffrey to allow the royal appointments and pay a fine of £2000 before his lands were restored, although Geoffrey was allowed some time to make the full payment. (Note: Gerald of Wales relates a story that Richard changed the text of the agreement from the agreed-upon 2000 marks to £2000, thus increasing the amount Geoffrey owed by a third.)

In early 1190, Geoffrey ordered a halt to religious ceremonies in the cathedral and excommunicated Henry Marshal and Burchard in retaliation for a dispute during an earlier church service. Richard, who was in Normandy preparing to go on the Third Crusade, ordered Geoffrey to the king's presence in Normandy. Although Hugh du Puiset, who was Justiciar, was hampering Geoffrey's attempts to collect revenue for the earlier fine, Richard insisted on immediate full payment. When Geoffrey was unable to pay, Richard re-confiscated his lands, increased the amount of the fine, and demanded a promise that Geoffrey would not visit England for three years. The dispute was settled once more when the pope stepped in and ratified Geoffrey's election, thus enabling a reconciliation between the king and the archbishop at Tours in June. Geoffrey's estates were returned to him in July after paying 800 marks of his fine.

=== Consecration and more difficulties ===
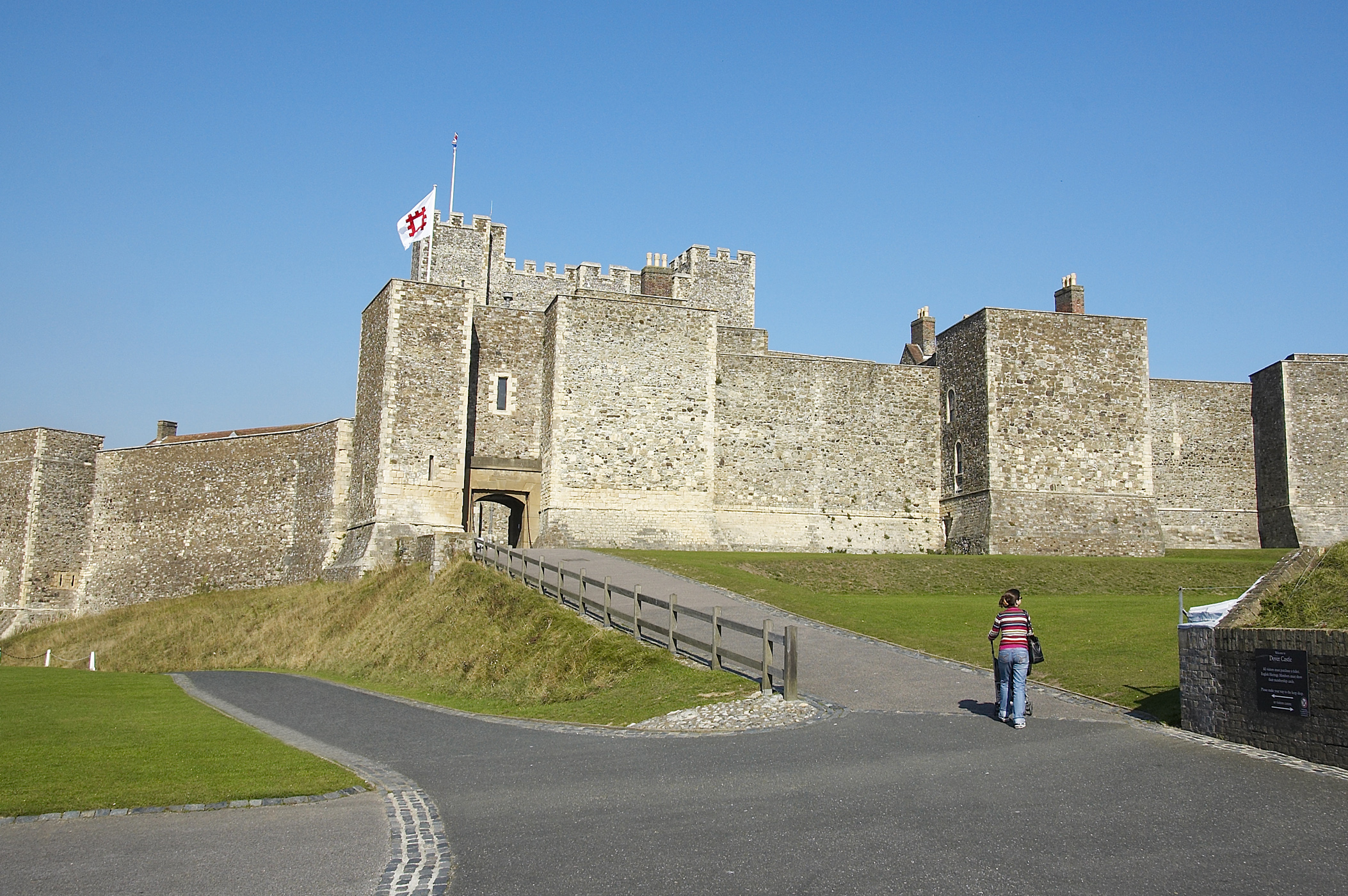
Dover Castle, where Geoffrey was briefly imprisoned

Geoffrey was consecrated on 18 August 1191, at Tours in France, by Barthelemy de Vendôme, the Archbishop of Tours, after the papacy agreed to allow the consecration. This permission was secured by the intervention of the king and his mother, Queen Eleanor. Turner and Heiser see the presumed motivation behind Eleanor and Richard's support as part of an effort to secure a counter-weight to the power exercised in England by the Chancellor, William Longchamp, about whom complaints had reached Richard in Sicily. Geoffrey received his pallium, the symbol of an archbishop's authority, at his consecration. In September 1191, after the consecration, he attempted to go to York, but was met at Dover by agents of Longchamp, and even though he took refuge in the priory of St. Martin in Dover, was dragged from sanctuary and imprisoned in Dover Castle. Longchamp claimed that Geoffrey had not sworn fealty to Richard, but this was probably just an excuse to eliminate a rival. Another complication was that the English bishops had appealed to the papacy because Geoffrey had not been consecrated by the Archbishop of Canterbury, and Longchamp could therefore claim to have been acting on behalf of the other bishops in ordering Geoffrey's arrest. But the actions of Longchamp's agents were considered excessive and there was soon an outcry against the Chancellor's arrest of Geoffrey, even though Longchamp claimed that his orders had been exceeded by his agents. One cause of the outrage was the obvious parallel with the murder of Thomas Becket, who had been dragged from an altar and martyred. The archbishop was released and took part in a council held at Loddon Bridge, between Reading and Windsor; Longchamp was excommunicated and deposed from the chancellorship, and Hugh of Lincoln, the Bishop of Lincoln, excommunicated those who had dragged Geoffrey from sanctuary. Geoffrey was then enthroned at York on 1 November 1191.

While still embroiled in his conflict with Longchamp, Geoffrey began feuding with Hugh du Puiset, probably over Geoffrey's authority in Puiset's diocese of Durham, one of those subject to York. The dispute dragged on for years, with many appeals to Rome and the king. York had been vacant for several years, and Puiset had grown used to having untrammelled authority in the northern archdiocese. After Geoffrey's consecration, he summoned Puiset to a provincial synod in late September 1191, at which the bishop was charged with various irregularities. Puiset appealed to Rome and refused to attend the synod, and was excommunicated in December by Geoffrey. An attempt in March 1192 by Queen Eleanor and Hubert Walter to settle the issue came to nothing when Geoffrey insisted on a pledge of obedience from Puiset, who in turn demanded an admission from Geoffrey that the excommunication had been unjust. Further appeals to Rome led to an eventual settlement in October 1192, when the bishop finally acknowledged Geoffrey's authority over Durham.

Geoffrey caused offence by his attempts to have his episcopal cross carried before him in the diocese of Canterbury, thus implying that his diocese was superior or at least equal to Canterbury in rank. In pursuit of this rivalry between York and Canterbury, Geoffrey was the first archbishop of York to style himself "Primate of England", in opposition to the Canterbury title of "Primate of all England". (Note: The rivalry, usually known as the Canterbury–York dispute, began shortly after the Norman Conquest and did not end until the 14th century.) He also attempted to subordinate Clementhorpe Priory to Godstow Abbey, which provoked an appeal from Prioress Alice of Clementhorpe to the papacy. Probably owing to Pope Celestine III's dislike of Geoffrey, Hubert Walter was given a papal legateship that included Geoffrey's province, something that had not been usual in the preceding years, and which presented Geoffrey with some difficulties in his dealings with the ecclesiastical hierarchy. But Geoffrey was on friendly terms with Prince John; the historian G. V. Scammell has suggested that Geoffrey's consecration allowed John to feel that Geoffrey was no longer a rival for the throne, thus paving the way for good relations between the two half-brothers.

Geoffrey long faced opposition from some members of his cathedral chapter, led by Henry Marshal, Burchard du Puiset, and Roger of London. They objected to his having given a large part of York's treasury toward Richard's ransom, (Note: Richard was held captive in Germany while returning from crusade and was only released after the payment of a ransom, which was 150,000 marks. To raise this sum, all of Richard's subjects were taxed at the rate of 25% for both their incomes and their possessions. These payments were required from both laymen and the clergy.) and to some of his appointments in the church of York. Charges of simony, extortion, and neglect of his duties were lodged against Geoffrey, who, in return, excommunicated the ringleaders more than once, and locked the canons out of church. Geoffrey also faced difficulties with his appointees to the office of Dean of York; his first choice, his half-brother Peter, was opposed by the cathedral chapter. Geoffrey's second choice, Simon of Apulia, the chancellor of York, refused to give up the office when Geoffrey decided to award it to a third man, Philip of Poitou. Simon was supported by the cathedral chapter, who elected him to the office despite Geoffrey's opposition. An appeal was made to the papacy by Geoffrey while Simon travelled to King Richard in Germany. The king refused to allow the appeal and tried to summon Geoffrey to Germany to resolve the issue. Geoffrey was unable to leave York because of disturbances within the cathedral clergy, and Simon managed to secure papal confirmation as Dean of York.

=== Quarrels with John, Hubert Walter and Richard ===
When Prince John rebelled in 1193, Geoffrey and Hugh du Puiset put aside their feud to quash the uprising. Geoffrey strengthened Doncaster's defences and went to the aid of Puiset, who was besieging Tickhill Castle. In 1194, Geoffrey went into debt to the crown for the sum of 3000 marks to buy the office of Sheriff of Yorkshire for himself. Later that year, Geoffrey began to quarrel with Hubert Walter over the primacy of England, which Canterbury claimed, and York disputed. Walter's decision to have his episcopal cross carried before him in the diocese of York in March 1194 was symbolic of his claim to primacy over York and all of England. Geoffrey responded by having his own cross carried before him in the diocese of Canterbury the following month. King Richard did not reprimand Geoffrey for this act of provocation, and even went so far as to restore some of his confiscated estates. Before Richard left England in May 1194, he appointed Walter as Justiciar; that summer, Walter began an investigation into Geoffrey's actions, which led to Geoffrey's estates being confiscated once again. Geoffrey appealed to the king, who was then in Maine; Richard over-ruled Walter, restored Geoffrey's estates, and pardoned him in return for a payment of 1000 marks and the promise of 1000 more to follow.

In January 1195, Geoffrey was ordered to appear in Rome to answer various charges, under the threat of suspension from office if he did not appear by 1 June. Further quarrels with his cathedral clergy followed, including an instance of the cathedral chapter throwing chrism on a dungheap in protest. Geoffrey protested to the king after Richard forbade Geoffrey's projected journey to Rome, and in retaliation, the king confiscated Geoffrey's estates once more. This left Geoffrey vulnerable when Walter held a legatine council at York in June 1195. Geoffrey had managed to secure a postponement of his case at Rome until 1 November, but was still unable to attend, which led Pope Celestine to order that Geoffrey's suspension should be performed by Hugh of Lincoln. Hugh protested, and as a result, Celestine himself suspended Geoffrey on 23 December 1195, finally forcing Geoffrey to answer the charges against him. He travelled to Rome in 1196, where his accusers were unable to substantiate their claims, and he was restored to office by the pope.

Geoffrey quarrelled with Richard in 1196 in Normandy while the archbishop was attempting to return to England. Richard forbade him from administering York, and Geoffrey returned to Rome until 1198. An attempt at reconciliation with Richard came to nothing after Geoffrey refused to approve the king's appointments in the diocese of York without some guarantees that they would be approved by the papacy. Ultimately Pope Innocent III on 28 April 1199 ordered that Geoffrey was to be restored to his lands as soon as he had paid his debts to the king. Innocent further ordered that any royal appointments in York would require papal approval.

== Under John ==
After John succeeded Richard in 1199, he decided to restore Geoffrey to the archiepiscopal estates, but continued to receive the income until the archbishop returned from Rome. Some of Geoffrey's opponents who were officials in his diocese resigned their offices, and for a short time peace reigned in York. But the perceived arrogance of Geoffrey's officials offended the cathedral chapter at York, and this further conflict was not resolved until March 1200. For most of the remainder of 1199, Geoffrey was frequently with the king, and the two appear to have been on good terms, a state of affairs that continued throughout the first half of 1200.

In October 1200, Geoffrey refused to allow the collection of carucage, a tax on land, on his property, and his lands were confiscated in retaliation. He then excommunicated the new sheriff of Yorkshire, James of Poterne, who had ravaged Geoffrey's lands in revenge. In November 1200, Geoffrey and John were reconciled at Hugh of Lincoln's funeral, which allowed Geoffrey to regain his confiscated estates, but the archbishop's continued refusal to allow the collection of carucage led to the truce falling apart. In January 1201, John made peace with his half-brother, but it did not last, as Geoffrey continued to refuse to allow the tax to be collected. John then renewed the demand for the payment for the office of sheriff due from Richard's reign, which forced Geoffrey to rescind his excommunication and offer another payment in return for peace, which occurred in May 1201. But it was short-lived; disputes over the appointments in the diocese of York broke out, but with the support of Pope Innocent, Geoffrey was able to secure the appointment of a few of his own candidates. Geoffrey also quarrelled with some of the monasteries in his diocese, with the usual claims and counterclaims going to the papacy for judgement. Among the religious houses Geoffrey had disagreements with were Guisborough Priory, Meaux Abbey, and Fountains Abbey. Most of these conflicts arose from disputed appointments to offices, but the quarrel with Meaux involved claims of tithe exemption by that house.

Geoffrey submitted to John in 1206, and his lands were returned to him. But in 1207, Geoffrey led the clergy of England in their refusal to pay royal taxation and was forced into exile. Geoffrey excommunicated anyone who attempted to collect the tax in his archdiocese, but the king confiscated Geoffrey's estates in retaliation. Geoffrey once again secured the support of Pope Innocent, who ordered John to restore Geoffrey's possessions, but in the meantime, the archbishop had fled to France. A medieval chronicler, Geoffrey of Coldingham, stated that the English church considered Geoffrey a martyr because of his stand against King John.

== Death and legacy ==
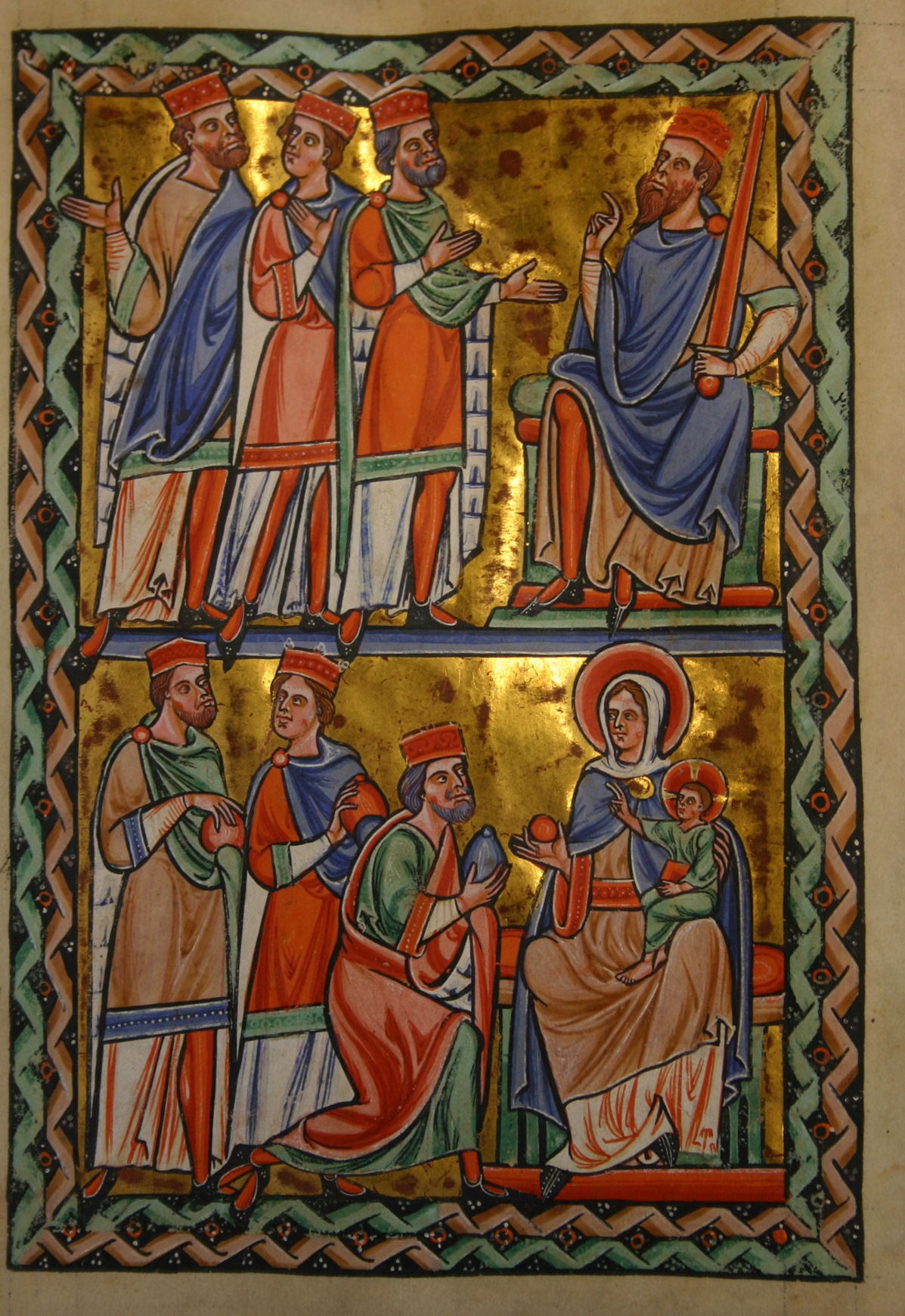
Scenes from the Life of Christ in the Leiden St Louis Psalter made for Geoffrey

Geoffrey died while still in exile at Grandmont in Normandy on 12 December 1212. He was buried at a Grandmontine monastery near Rouen, where he had been living for a few years. His tomb was still extant in 1767, when the inscription on it was recorded by an antiquary. He may have become a monk before his death.

Although his archiepiscopate was mainly marked by the conflicts in which he engaged, Geoffrey also managed to institute some administrative reforms in his diocese, creating the office of chancellor. He also inspired loyalty from some of his household members, many of whom witnessed his charters, and although he made enemies of several of the suffragan bishops, clergy, and religious houses in his diocese, he also secured the friendship and support of other clergy, including Pope Innocent III and Hugh of Lincoln. Although Walter Map declared that Geoffrey was "full of faults and devoid of character", he remained loyal to his father until Henry's death. A modern-day historian, Thomas Jones, summed up Geoffrey's character with the phrase "quarrelsome and undiplomatic". Another historian, J. C. Holt, stated that Geoffrey was through his career "a perpetual source of danger, quarrelling now with de Puiset, now with the Yorkshire sheriffs, ever ready to attack the judicial and fiscal superiority of the Crown."

Geoffrey's ambitions may have included becoming King of England, which may account for some of the harshness that his two legitimate half-brothers displayed towards him. His military abilities, displayed in the rebellion of 1173–1174, as well as his custody of castles near Tours, would have also fed into Richard's disquiet over Geoffrey's possible intentions. Geoffrey was known to be ambitious, which led the historian D. L. Douie to call him a "formidable bastard". The historian Ralph Turner said of Geoffrey that "he sought power and wealth despite the handicap of his birth" and that he had "inherited the bad temper of the other Plantagenets".

Geoffrey was a patron of scholarship, and employed scholars throughout his life, one of whom, Honorius of Kent, Geoffrey appointed Archdeacon of Richmond. Honorius was subsequently employed by Hubert Walter and wrote a legal work on canon law. The Leiden St Louis Psalter (Note: It is in Latin on parchment containing 185 folios with 23 miniatures, now at Leiden in the University Library under catalogue MS. lat. 76A.) is a lavishly illuminated psalter made for the archbishop, probably in northern England in the 1190s, which passed into the hands of Blanche of Castile after Geoffrey's death, and, as religious manuscripts often were, was used to teach the future saint King Louis IX of France how to read, as recorded by a 14th-century inscription. After the king's death, it passed through several royal owners, regarded as a relic of the saint, before reaching the University Library at Leiden in 1741.

== Citations ==
Political offices
Preceded by Ralph de Warneville	Lord Chancellor; 1181–1189	Succeeded by William Longchamp
Catholic Church titles
Preceded by Robert de Chesney	Bishop of Lincoln; 1173–1183	Succeeded by Walter de Coutances
Preceded by Roger de Pont L'Évêque	Archbishop of York; 1181–1212	Succeeded by Simon Langton
