= Nicholas de Aquila =

13th-century Bishop of Chichester

- Bishop of Chichester-elect
- Appointed: 1209
- Quashed: c. 1214
- Predecessor: Simon of Wells
- Successor: Richard Poore
- Other post: Dean of Chichester

Personal details
- Died: after 26 May 1220
- Denomination: Catholic

Nicholas de Aquila (Note: Or Nicholas de l'Aigle or Gilbert de l'Aigle;) (died after 1220) was a medieval Bishop of Chichester-elect.

== Life ==
Aquila was a canon lawyer. He may be the master of the school at Avranches in 1198, but was Dean of Chichester before February 1201. He was nominated as bishop in 1209, but was never consecrated. His election was quashed about 1214. He was named Dean of Avranches by 1211 and died sometime after 26 May 1220.

== Citations ==
Catholic Church titles
Preceded by Simon of Wells	Bishop of Chichester election quashed 1209–1214	Succeeded by Richard Poore
