= William Basset (12th-century judge) =

12th-century Anglo-Norman sheriff

William Basset (c. 1134–c. 1185) was an Anglo-Norman administrator and justice.

Basset was the son of Richard Basset, a royal justice and his wife Matilda Ridel. In 1159 he served as under-sheriff to his brother Ralph, who was Sheriff of Warwickshire and Leicestershire. In 1163–1164 William served as Sheriff alone. He continued in office until 1170. He served as a justice on eyres as well as in the curia regis from 1168 to 1183. In 1177 he was appointed Sheriff of Lincolnshire and continued to hold that office until 1185.

Basset's legal opinions are cited in the Tractatus de legibus et consuetudinibus regni Anglie, or Glanvill, a treatise on legal procedures in England.

Basset held lands at Sapcote, in Leicestershire, besides other lands in Buckinghamshire and Warwickshire. Besides his judicial functions, he also served in the Exchequer, with his last appearance there being on 31 May 1185.

Basset had a son and heir Simon. William Basset died around 1185. Basset gave lands to Launde Priory, which had been founded by his parents.
