= William FitzRalph =

- Continental domains of the Angevins, the most northern being the Duchy of Normandy, governed by William FitzRalph.
- Tenure: 1178 - 1200
- Predecessor: Richard of Ilchester
- Successor: Guérin de Glapion
- Other names: Guillaume fils Raoul
- Years active: 1169 - 1200
- Born: 1140; Derbyshire
- Died: 1200 (aged 59–60)
- Residence: Caen
- Offices: Seneschal of Normandy, High Sheriff of Nottinghamshire, Derbyshire and the Royal Forests
- Issue: Robert FitzRalph, Matilda de Salicosa Mara, Avice
- Parents: Ralph FitzGeremund and Hawise

William FitzRalph was the High Sheriff of Nottinghamshire, Derbyshire and the Royal Forests from 1169 to 1177. After, he was the seneschal of Normandy for 22 years under two dukes of Normandy, Henry II and Richard I, from 1178 to 1200.

== Life ==
William FitzRalph owned land in Derbyshire and was the High Sheriff of Nottinghamshire, Derbyshire and the Royal Forests from 1169 until 1177. FitzRalph was appointed the seneschal of Normandy in 1177 and was in office from 1178. He took over the position permanently from Richard of Ilchester, who stepped down acting seneschal to return to the English exchequer.

FitzRalph resided in and owned Caen, where in January 1183 he presided over Henry II of England's court there, Caen also being the home of the Exchequer of Normandy. He held court in Argentan, Bernai, Longueville, Neufchâtel, Saint-Wandrille, and Rouen.

When Richard I of England became duke in 1189, FitzRalph's position was reconfirmed, making him the only seneschal of Richard's French possessions to keep his office; Stephen of Tours was replaced in Anjou by Payn de Rochefort, Peter Bertin was made seneschal of Poitou, and Helie de la Celle was made seneschal of Gascony.

The prestige of the office of seneschal of Normandy increased during FitzRalph's tenure, and began to fulfill the same functions as the Justiciar of England. Charles Haskins believed that the seneschal had enhanced importance partly due to FitzRalph's personality, as he became second only to the sovereign in all administrative matters, however, Jacques Boussard's viewed the power and eminence of the position as resulting from Richard of Ilchester's work in reorganising the exchequer.

FitzRalph continued as seneschal until his death in 1200. William Marshal stated that FitzRalph was "brave and wise but too old to fight" after a French courtier jokingly suggested that he should be one of King Henry's champions.

At an unknown date, William FitzRalph had a son, Robert FitzRalph, who became Archdeacon of Nottingham around 1185 and later became Bishop of Worcester on 1 July 1190. William seems to have a considerable interest in pious works. Through Robert he granted to Darley Abbey st Michael's Church, Derby, and the chapel of Alvaston. However, in the case of Dale (Stanley Park) Abbey in Derbyshire, a Premonstratensian house where he was celebrated as founder, he left a large part of the actual work to his daughter Matilda and her husband, Geoffrey de Salicosa Mara, and also charged them £100 for the "gift" of Stanley, which he had purchased for them and they transferred to the new abbey.

In 1938, the leaden seal-die of William FitzRalph was found at Exton, Rutland.
