= Bassett (surname) =

Bassett is an English surname which may refer to:

- Alexander Hunter Bassett (1795–1880), American planter and local leader
- Angela Bassett (born 1958), American actress
- Ann Bassett (1878–1956), American rancher
- Anne S. Bassett, Canadian psychiatrist
- Arthur Bassett (rugby) (1914–1999), Welsh rugby player
- Arthur Basset (1597–1673), English Member of Parliament
- Arthur Bassett (died 1586), English Member of Parliament
- Billy Bassett (1869–1937), English football player and director
- Billy Bassett (Welsh footballer) (1912–1977), Welsh footballer
- Bo Bassett (born 2007), American wrestler
- Caitlin Bassett (netball) (born 1988), Australian netball player
- Carling Bassett-Seguso (born 1967), Canadian tennis player
- Charles Bassett (1931–1966), American astronaut
- Charles Bassett (basketball) (fl. 1927–1933), American basketball coach
- Charley Bassett (1863–1942), baseball player
- Charlie Bassett (circa 1847–1896), American lawman and saloon keeper
- Douglas Bassett (media executive) (born 1940), Canadian media executive
- Burwell Bassett Jr. (1764–1841), American politician and Virginia plantation owner
- Christopher Bassett (1753–1784), Welsh Methodist cleric
- Cyril Bassett (1892–1983), New Zealand recipient of the Victoria Cross
- Dave Bassett (born 1944), English football manager
- Dave Bassett (songwriter), American songwriter and producer
- Deborah Bassett (born 1965), Australian rower
- Desireé Bassett (born 1992), American musician
- Ebenezer Bassett (1833–1908), American diplomat
- Edgar R. Bassett (1914–1942), United States Navy officer, pilot, and Navy Cross recipient
- Edward Bassett (1863–1948), American urban planner, "father of American zoning"
- Edward Charles Bassett (1921–1999), American architect
- George Bassett (1818–1886), British confectioner and mayor of Sheffield
- Glenn Bassett (1927–2020), American tennis player and coach
- Hubert Bassett (1867–1943), English cricketer
- Isabel Bassett (born 1939), Canadian broadcaster and politician
- Jack Bassett (1905–1989), Welsh rugby full back
- James Bassett (author) (1912–1978), American newspaper editor and author
- John Bassett (disambiguation)
- Johnnie Bassett (1935–2012), American electric blues guitarist, singer, and songwriter
- Johnny Bassett (born 1935), English progenitor of Beyond the Fringe
- Josh Bassett (born 1992), English rugby union player
- Joshua Bassett (born 2000), American actor and singer
- Joshua Bassett (academic) (c. 1641–1720), English academic, master of Sidney Sussex College, Cambridge
- Laura Bassett (born 1983), English footballer
- Leslie Bassett (1923–2016), American composer of classical music
- Mabel Bassett (1876–1953), Oklahoman Commissioner of Charities and Corrections
- Marnie Bassett (1889–1980), Australian historian and biographer
- Mary T. Bassett (born 1952), commissioner of the New York City Department of Health and Mental Hygiene
- Michael Bassett (born 1938), former member of the New Zealand House of Representatives
- Mo Bassett (1931–1991), American football player
- Nathan Bassett (born 1976), Australian rules footballer
- Nick Bassett, American musician
- Ollie Bassett (born 1998), Northern Irish association footballer
- Paddy Bassett (1918–2019), New Zealand agricultural scientist
- Preston Bassett (1892–1992), American engineer
- Ralph Basset (died c. 1127), royal justice and administrator
- Richard Bassett (disambiguation)
- Ronald Bassett (1924–1996), British novelist
- Ronnie Bassett Jr. (born 1995), American stock car racing driver
- Samuel Symons Bassett (1840–1912), Australian winemaker and founder of Romavilla Winery
- Spencer Bassett (1885–1917), English footballer
- Ted Bassett (1889–1970), English footballer
- Ted Bassett (businessman) (1921–2025), American executive in law enforcement and horse racing
- Wayne R. Bassett Sr. (1915–1988), American politician and librarian
- William Bassett (disambiguation)
- Zered Bassett (born 1984), American skateboarder

== Fictional characters ==
- Earl Bassett, a hired hand in the film Tremors
- Madeline Bassett, a P. G. Wodehouse character
- The title protagonist of Mike Bassett: England Manager, a 2001 satirical movie
- Watkyn Bassett, a P. G. Wodehouse character

== See also ==
- Justice Bassett (disambiguation)
- Senator Bassett (disambiguation)
- Basset (surname)
- Bassitt, a surname
