= Basset (surname) =

Basset is a surname of French origin. Notable people with the surname include:

- Alfred Barnard Basset (1854–1930), British mathematician
- André Basset (1895–1956), French linguist and orientalist, son of René Basset and brother of Henri Basset
- Anne Basset (1520 before 1558), English lady-in-waiting, reputed to have been a mistress of King Henry VIII
- Basset family includes wealthy landowners in Cornwall
- David Basset (1687–1701), merchant active in Newfoundland and New England
- Frances Basset, 2nd Baroness Basset (1781–1855), British peeress
- Francis Basset (disambiguation)
- Henri Basset (1892–1926), French linguist and historian, son of René Basset and brother of André Basset
- Jean Basset (died 1707), French Catholic priest in China
- Jean Basset (died 1715), French Catholic priest in New France
- Jean-Marie Basset (born 1943), French chemist
- John Basset (1462–1528), courtier in the reign of Henry VIII
- John Basset (1518–1541), servant to Thomas Cromwell, Lord Privy Seal
- John Basset (writer) (1791–1843), English writer on Cornish mining
- René Basset (1855–1924), French orientalist, father of André and Henri Basset
- Sarah Basset or Sally Bassett (died 1730), slave in Bermuda executed by burning for attempted murder
- William Basset (disambiguation)

== See also ==
- Bassett (surname)
