= Bassot =

Bassot (English: /bæˈsoʊ/, French: [baso]) is a French surname. Notable people with the surname include:

- Jean Michel Bassot (born 1959), French footballer
- Sylvia Bassot (1940–2014), French politician

== See also ==
- Basset (surname)
