= William Basset =

William Basset may refer to:

- William Basset (12th-century judge) (c. 1134–c. 1185), Anglo-Norman administrator and justice
- William Basset (divine) (1644–1695), English divine
- William Basset (13th-century judge) (died 1249), English judge

== See also ==
- Basset (surname)
- William Bassett (disambiguation)
