= Geoffrey Ridel =

Geoffrey Ridel may refer to:

- Geoffrey Ridel, Duke of Gaeta (died 1084), 11th-century south Italian duke
- Geoffrey Ridel (bishop of Ely) (died 1189), 12th-century English bishop
- Geoffrey Ridel (royal justice) (died 1120), 12th-century English judicial official
