= Marmousi model =

Seismic measurement model

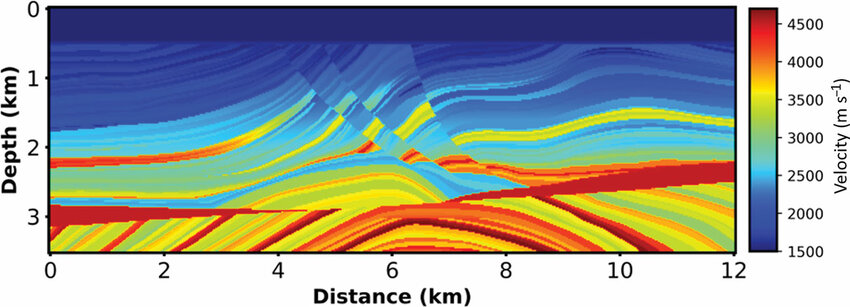
Marmousi2 velocity-model

The Marmousi model (mar moo’ sē) is a complex 2D structural model and its seismic response devised by the Institut Français du Petrole, with strong horizontal and vertical velocity changes. Since its inception in 1988, Marmousi has become a standard to compare depth-migration and velocity determination models and to this day remains one of the most published geophysical data sets.

== Model Generation ==
Based on a section in the Cuanza Basin a geometric model with 160 layers was generated using the MIMIC™ module of the SIERRA package. Realistic velocity and density distributions were defined by incorporating horizontal and vertical velocity gradients. The velocity gradient is higher in the shallower detrital series to represent strong compaction. The resulting model was transformed into a 2D velocity/density grid with dimensions of 9200 meters by 3000 meters and a grid size of 4 meters.

== Geology ==
The Marmousi model is created based on a profile through the North Quenguela in the Cuanza Basin (Angola). The mode includes a deltaic sediment interval deposited on a saliferous evaporitic series. The sediment thickens from west to east, with the eastern part exhibiting normal growth faults due to continuous lateral salt creep. The basin also contains presaliferous folded carbonate platform deposits, which are potential sites for structural hydrocarbon traps.

=== History ===
The geological history of the basin can be divided into two distinct phases. The first phase involves continuous platform sedimentation, followed by slight folding and erosion of the deposited marls and carbonates. The second phase begins with the deposition of an isopachous saliferous evaporitic series, followed by the accumulation of clayey-marly sediments rich in organic matter. The subsequent deposition consists of thick shaly-sandy detrital sediments influenced by continuous lateral salt creep, resulting in slanting growth faults. These growth faults remain active throughout the deposition of the detrital series.

=== Petroleum Prospects ===
In the detrital series, hydrocarbon traps are formed by structures associated with salt tectonics, such as residual salt cushion and inversion of depocenters caused by salt movement. The hydrocarbons in the sands originated from post-evaporitic source rock series and migrated upwards. The lower ante-saliferous series contains significant anticlinal structures, which were supplied with hydrocarbons from the overlying source rock series after the disappearance of salt due to lateral creep. The available data from three wells traverse an unfaulted sedimentary series without shaly-marly source rocks.

== Marmousi2 ==
In 2006 researchers from Houston (USA) updated the Marmousi model to fit the continuous advancements in computer hardware capabilities since the late 1980s, calling it Marmousi2. Based on the original Marmousi structure, the new model has been expanded in width and depth and was transformed into a fully elastic model, with high-frequency, high-fidelity, elastic, finite-difference synthetics. These simulations encompassed various shot records, including streamer, OBC, and VSP multicomponent data, with offsets of up to 15 km. Over time, the Marmousi2 model and dataset have proven to be valuable assets in various geophysical research applications, such as velocity analysis calibration, seismic migration, full-waveform inversion, AVO analysis, impedance inversion, multiple attenuation, and multicomponent imaging.
