= Richard Bassett =

Richard Basset or Bassett may refer to:

- Richard Basset (died between 1135 and 1144), royal judge and sheriff during the reign of King Henry I of England
- Richard Basset, 1st Baron Basset of Weldon (died 1314), English noble
- Richard Bassett (priest) (1777–1852), Welsh cleric
- Richard Bassett (Delaware politician) (1745–1815), American lawyer and politician
- Richard Bassett (Indiana politician) (1846–1905), Indiana Baptist minister and state legislator
- Richard H. Bassett (1900–1995), American impressionist painter
- SS Richard Bassett, American ship, launched 1942, named after the Delaware politician
