= Jean Basset =

Jean Basset may refer to:

- Jean Basset (died 1707), French Catholic priest in China
- Jean Basset (died 1715), French Catholic priest in New France

== See also ==
- Jean-Marie Basset (born 1943), French chemist
- John Basset (disambiguation)
