= Susannah Scott =

Canadian-American chemist

Susannah Lesley Scott
- Education: Iowa State University; University of Alberta
- Scientific career
- Workplaces: University of California, Santa Barbara; University of Ottawa; French National Centre for Scientific Research
- Thesis: Reactions of some chromium-oxygen complexes containing superoxo, hydroperoxo, oxo, and mu-peroxo ligands (1991)

Susannah L. Scott is a Canadian-American chemist who is Professor of Surface Chemistry and the Duncan and Suzanne Mellichamp Chair in Sustainable Catalysis at the University of California, Santa Barbara. Her research considers the design of heterogeneous catalysts for the efficient conversion of feedstocks and catalysts that improve the environment. She serves as an Executive Editor of ACS Catalysis and is a Fellow of American Association for the Advancement of Science.

== Early life and education ==
Scott earned a bachelor's degree in chemistry at the University of Alberta. She moved to Iowa State University for her doctoral work, where she studied oxygen activation and oxidation mechanisms catalysed by transition metals. She worked under the supervision of James (Jim) Espenson and Andreja Bakac. After completing her doctorate, Scott joined the French National Centre for Scientific Research as a NATO Postdoctoral Fellow where she worked with Jean-Marie Basset.

== Research and career ==
In 2001, Scott joined the faculty at the University of Ottawa, where she was named a Canada Research Chair. Scott moved to the University of California, Santa Barbara in 2003.

Scott's research considers the design of heterogeneous catalysts for the efficient conversion of feedstocks and catalysts that improve the environment. The design of heterogenous catalysts is limited because of the lack of information about the identities of the active sites. To overcome these shortcomings, Scott has created model catalysts with precisely controlled local structures. She has created models of the active sites for the polymerisation of olefin and metathesis.

Scott makes use of advanced spectroscopic methods to evaluate reaction mechanisms. In particular she makes use of infrared and X-ray absorption spectroscopy. In 2014, she founded the Mellichamp Academic Initiative in Sustainable Manufacturing and Product Design (SMDP), which studies the extraction and manufacture of fuels and other materials. She is interested in renewable feedstocks and environmentally-degradable materials. She has developed low temperature catalysists that can upcycle polyethylene, allowing the conversion of used plastics into high-value materials. She was named the Duncan & Suzanne Mellichamp Academic Initiative Professor in 2014.

In 2020, Scott was elected chair of the University of California, Santa Barbara Academic Senate. That year she was appointed chair of the Gordon Research Conferences on Catalysis, which is due to be held in New Hampshire in 2022.

== Awards and honours ==
- 2000 YWCA Women of Distinction Award
- 2009 Elected Fellow of the American Association for the Advancement of Science
- 2017 University of Pennsylvania Grace Hopper Distinguished Lecturer
- 2018 University of Amsterdam John van Geuns Lecturer
- 2019 Colorado State University Boulder Scientific Lecturer
- 2020 University of California, Berkeley Eastman Visiting Lecturer

== Selected publications ==
- Valbona Celo; Lean, David Robert Samuel; Susannah L Scott (2005). "Abiotic methylation of mercury in the aquatic environment". Science of the Total Environment. 368 (1): 126–137. doi:10.1016/j.scitotenv.2005.09.043. PMID 16226793. Wikidata Q81355113.
- Brandon J O'Neill; David H K Jackson; Anthony J Crisci; et al. (2013). "Stabilization of copper catalysts for liquid-phase reactions by atomic layer deposition". Angewandte Chemie International Edition. 52 (51): 13808–13812. doi:10.1002/anie.201308245. PMID 24282166. Wikidata Q30702690.
- Zhang, Fan; Zeng, Manhao; Yappert, Ryan D.; Sun, Jiakai; Lee, Yu-Hsuan; LaPointe, Anne M.; Peters, Baron; Abu-Omar, Mahdi M.; Scott, Susannah L. (2020-10-22). "Polyethylene upcycling to long-chain alkylaromatics by tandem hydrogenolysis/aromatization". Science. 370 (6515): 437–441. Bibcode:2020Sci...370..437Z. doi:10.1126/science.abc5441. ISSN 0036-8075. PMID 33093105. S2CID 225042321.
- Chamas, Ali; Moon, Hyunjin; Zheng, Jiajia; Qiu, Yang; Tabassum, Tarnuma; Jang, Jun Hee; Abu-Omar, Mahdi; Scott, Susannah L.; Suh, Sangwon (2020-03-09). "Degradation Rates of Plastics in the Environment". ACS Sustainable Chemistry & Engineering. 8 (9): 3494–3511. doi:10.1021/acssuschemeng.9b06635.
