= Geoffrey Ridel (royal justice) =

12th-century Anglo-Norman nobleman and royal official

Geoffrey Ridel (died 25 November 1120) was a landholder and royal justice during the reign of King Henry I of England.

Ridel is mentioned in the 1086 Domesday Book as holding land in Norfolk, and is probably also the same Geoffrey who held land in Derbyshire in Domesday. The mention in the Norfolk section of Domesday notes that Ridel had journeyed with William Bigod, brother of Roger Bigod, back from Apulia. Ridel and William's arrival in England can be dated to between 1075 and 1086. Ridel may have been born in southern Italy or Sicily, as a Ridel family was well known there in the 11th and 12th centuries. Another Geoffrey Ridel (active between 1061 and 1084) was a supporter of Robert Guiscard and was appointed Duke of Gaeta. Other possibilities for his origin include the county of Perche, where a Geoffrey Ridel was a witness to a charter of the Count of Perche around 1080.

Ridel married Geva, who is often stated to have been an illegitimate daughter of Hugh, Earl of Chester. However, there is no contemporary evidence stating that she was, and her illegitimacy is inferred from the fact that she did not inherit her father's lands. Ridel's lands were centered on Great Weldon in Northamptonshire, which had belonged to Robert de Buci in Domesday Book.

Ridel first appears as a witness to Henry's documents in 1105. In 1106, Ridel served as a royal justice hearing a case concerning the rights of the Archbishop of York to the church at Ripon. Along with Ridel, Ralph Basset, Ranulf Meschin, and Peter de Valognes served on the panel of judges. In 1111, Ridel was an advisor to Queen Matilda, who had been left as regent of England while Henry was in Normandy.

The chronicler Henry of Huntingdon called Ridel "justice of all England", although this title was also given to Ralph Basset, Richard Basset, and Robert Bloet, and should not be equated to the title of Chief Justiciar. Instead, the phrase probably indicated that Ridel, along with the others, was a royal justice who had powers that were not restricted to any one part of England, but that extended over the entirety of the kingdom.

Ridel died in 1120 in the shipwreck of the White Ship. His heiress was his daughter Matilda, who married Richard Basset, son of Ralph Basset. Ridel probably also had two other daughters, Mabel and another daughter who married William Blund. Mabel married Richard de St Medard. Geva survived Ridel and later founded the monastic house of Canwell Priory in Staffordshire.

Ridel's brother, Matthew, was a monk of Mont Saint-Michel and was elected abbot of Peterborough Abbey in 1102 but died on 21 October 1103. Ridel acquired the manor of Pytchley in Northamptonshire, which belonged to Peterborough, through the offices of his brother. After Matthew's death, the next abbot attempted to regain the manor, but Ridel successfully retain control, although he was required to pay rent for the property.
