= Justice Bassett =

Justice Bassett may refer to:

- James P. Bassett (born 1956), associate justice of the New Hampshire Supreme Court
- Norman L. Bassett (1869–1931), associate justice of the Maine Supreme Judicial Court

== See also ==
- Richard Basset (died between 1135 and 1144), 12th-century English judge
