= William Bassett =

William Bassett may refer to:

- William Bassett (fl. 1552–53), MP for Maldon
- William Bassett (died 1553), MP for Derbyshire
- William Bassett (died 1586) (1507–1586), MP for Glamorgan
- William Bassett (died 1601), MP for Staffordshire
- William Bassett (Royalist) (died 1656), MP for Bath
- William Bassett (d. 1667), early New England colonist
- William Bassett (died 1693) (1628–1693), MP for Bath
- William Bassett Jr. (1624–1703), whose daughter Elizabeth Proctor was accused of witchcraft in the 1692 Salem witch trials
- William H. Bassett (born 1935), American actor
- William Bassett (USAF officer), a USAF officer who, contrary to a received order, decided not to launch missiles armed with nuclear warheads while stationed at Okinawa during the 1962 Cuban Missile Crisis
- Billy Bassett (William Isiah Bassett, 1869–1937), English footballer, director and club chairman for West Bromwich Albion
- Billy Bassett (Welsh footballer) (William Edward George Bassett, 1912–1977)

== See also ==
- William Basset (disambiguation)
