= École Supérieure de Chimie Physique Électronique de Lyon =

French engineering school

Coordinates: 45°47′03″N 4°52′08″E

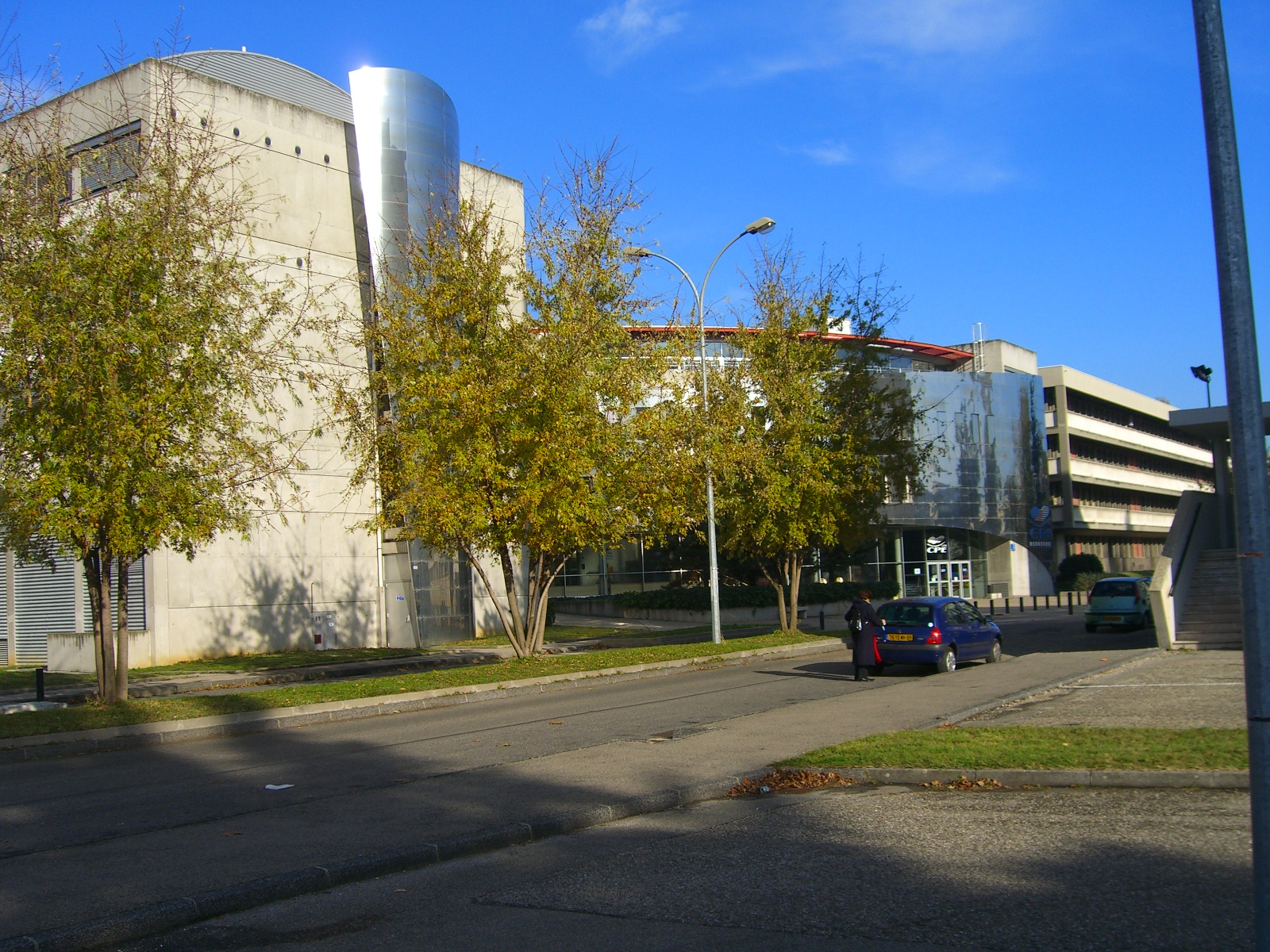
- CPE main building
- Type: Grande école
- Established: 1883
- President: Bernard Bigot
- Director: Gérard Pignault
- Administrative staff: 400
- Students: 1,650
- Location: Lyon, France
- Website: www.cpe.fr

École Supérieure de Chimie Physique Électronique de Lyon or CPE Lyon is a French grande école located in Villeurbanne, near Lyon.

== Degrees ==
CPE Lyon offers two diplôme d'ingénieur (French: [diplom dɛ̃ʒenjœʁ]) and two Master's level degrees, in two disciplines and three diplomas.

The chemistry and chemical engineering degrees involve the conception, synthesis and manufacture of new and valuable molecules that can be "first on the market". They also involve a focus on environmental issues, sustainability and management.

The electronics, telecommunications, maths and computer science degrees include a global education in electronics, microelectronics, computer science, image and signal processing, telecommunications, applied math and management.

CPE Lyon also conducts research in organic chemistry, analytical sciences, chemical and process engineering, microelectronics and image processing.

Selected students can prepare a PhD in one of the research laboratories (50 new students per year on average).

== History ==
In 1883, the École Supérieure de Chimie Industrielle de Lyon (ESCIL) was founded by Jules Raulin, a student of Louis Pasteur. In 1919 1912 Nobel Prize in Chemistry winner Victor Grignard became a director. In that same year, the Institut de Chimie et Physique Industrielles de Lyon (ICPI) was founded by Professor Lepercq. In 1933, the École Supérieure de Chimie Industrielle de Lyon (ESCIL) was awarded the Légion d'Honneur by the Ministry of War, for service to the nation.

In 1993, Hubert Curien, former chairman of the European Space Agency (ESA), former president of the CERN and former minister was appointed President of ESCIL. One year later, in 1994, the École Supérieure de Chimie Industrielle de Lyon (ESCIL) and the Institut de Chimie et Physique Industrielles de Lyon (ICPI) merged to form the current École Supérieure de Chimie Physique Électronique de Lyon (CPE-Lyon).

In 2005, Jean Dercourt, Secretary of the French Academy of Sciences, was appointed President of the École Supérieure de Chimie Physique Électronique de Lyon (CPE-Lyon).

== Notable alumni ==
Notable alumni of the École Supérieure de Chimie Physique Électronique de Lyon include, among many others:

=== Notable scientists ===
- Yves Chauvin (ESCIL 1954) : 2005 Nobel Prize in Chemistry
- Jean-Marie Basset (ESCIL 1965): Member of the French Academy of Sciences (Académie des sciences), received in 1991 the award from Max Planck Society
- Emile Kuntz (ESCIL 1965): awarded in 2005 with the Chéreau Lavet Prize - Prize of the French Academy of Technologies
- Jean Fréchet (ICPI-C 1966): Henry Rapoport Chair of Organic Chemistry at the Department of Chemistry, University of California, Berkeley
- Jean Jouzel (ESCIL 1968): glaciologist and climatologist

=== CEOs and industrialists ===
- Laurent de la Clergerie (ICPI-E 1994): Founder and Chairman of the Management Board of LDLC.com
- Bruno Bonnell (ESCIL 1981): Founder of Infogrames Entertainment, SA, Chairman of the Board, Acting Chief Financial Officer, Chief Creative Officer of Atari, Inc. and deputy La république en marche in the French parlement.
- Marcel Mérieux (ESCIL 1891): Student of Louis Pasteur and founder of Institut Mérieux that became Sanofi. Institut Mérieux is a parent company of bioMérieux.
- Aiman Ezzat: CEO of Capgemini

Others

- Marcelle Lafont (1930) - chemical engineer, Resistance heroine and politician.
- Jean-Christophe Rolland (ICPI-E 1991): Rowing Gold medal at the 2000 Sydney Olympic Games

== Facts & Figures ==
- 75% of the students spend at least one year abroad
- 75 Companies (average) attend the yearly CPE Lyon Student Recruiting Event (Journée Entreprise)
- 11 Research Laboratories in cooperation with the CNRS, Université Claude Bernard Lyon 1
- 24 000 m^{2} dedicated to the Education, R&D
- 500 publications per year
- 50 PhD graduations per year
- 30 patents per year
- 3,37M€ revenues from contracts with the Industry in 2005

== International Exchanges ==
For many years CPE Lyon has partnered with 90 universities abroad including:

- Queen's University
- Polytechnique Montréal
- Université de Montréal
- McGill University
- University of Toronto
- McMaster University
- University of Waterloo
- Université de Sherbrooke
- University of British Columbia
- Yuan Ze University
- Tianjin University of Technology
- École Polytechnique Fédérale de Lausanne
- ETH Zurich
- Universidad Industrial de Santander
- Georgia Institute of Technology
- University of Würzburg
- Hamburg University of Technology
- University of Stuttgart
- University of Ulm
- University of Jena
- Technical University of Munich (TUM)
- University of Karlsruhe (TH)
- Universidad Politecnica de Madrid
- Universidad de Salamanca
- Heriot-Watt University
- University College London
- University of Birmingham
- University of Durham
- University of Hull
- University of Newcastle
- University of Nottingham
- Eindhoven University of Technology
- Norwegian University of Science and Technology
- KTH Royal Institute of Technology
- North Carolina State University
- Oregon State University
- Purdue University
- Tufts University
- University of California, Berkeley
- University of Illinois Urbana-Champaign
- University of Illinois Chicago
- University of North Carolina at Chapel Hill
- University of Notre Dame
- University of Pittsburgh
- Texas A&M University
