= John Basset =

John Basset may refer to:

- John Basset (1462–1528), courtier in the reign of Henry VIII
- John Basset (1518–1541), servant to Thomas Cromwell, Lord Privy Seal
- John Basset (writer) (1791–1843), English writer on Cornish mining

== See also ==
- Basset family, English gentry
- John Bassett (disambiguation)
- Jean Basset (disambiguation)
- John Bassette (1941–2006), American folk singer and songwriter
