= John Bassett =

John Bassett may refer to:

- John Bassett (by 1503 – 1550 or 1551) of Uley in Gloucestershire, Member of Parliament (MP) for Midhurst
- John Bassett (died 1551), of Llantrithyd, Wales, MP for Old Sarum
- John D. Bassett (1866–1965), American industrialist
  - John D. Bassett High School in Bassett, Virginia
- John F. Bassett (1939–1986), Canadian tennis player, businessman, and film producer, son of John W. H. Bassett
- John Spencer Bassett (1867–1928), American academic and minority rights proponent
- John W. H. Bassett (1915–1998), Canadian media proprietor
  - John Bassett Theatre in Toronto
- Jack Bassett (1905–1989), Welsh rugby union player
- Johnnie Bassett (1935–2012), American electric blues guitarist and singer
- Johnny Bassett (born 1935), jazz musician credited with putting Beyond the Fringe together

== See also ==
- John Basset (disambiguation)
- John Bassette (1941–2006), American folk singer and songwriter
- John Bassett Moore (1860–1947), American lawyer
