= Stanton St. John =

Village in Oxfordshire, England

Coordinates: 51.777°N 1.162°W

Stanton St John
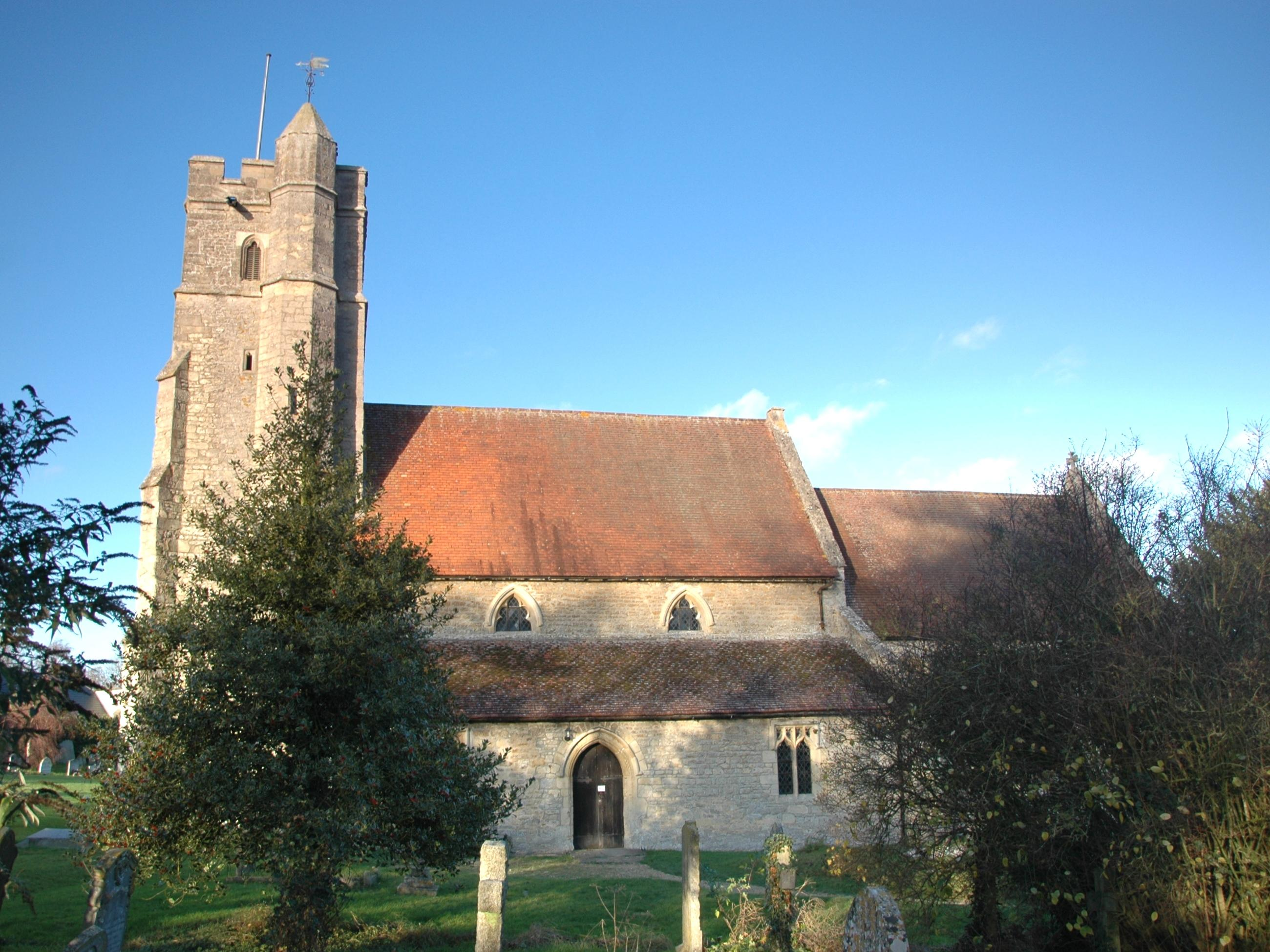
- St John the Baptist parish church

- Location within Oxfordshire
- Area: 10.93 km^{2} (4.22 sq mi)
- Population: 456 (2021 census)
  - Density: 42/km^{2} (110/sq mi)
- OS grid reference: SP5709
- Civil parish: Stanton St John
- District: South Oxfordshire
- Shire county: Oxfordshire
- Region: South East
- Country: England
- Sovereign state: United Kingdom
- Post town: Oxford
- Postcode district: OX33
- Dialling code: 01865
- Police: Thames Valley
- Fire: Oxfordshire
- Ambulance: South Central
- UK Parliament: Henley and Thame
- Website: stantonstjohn.com

Stanton St John is a village and civil parish in Oxfordshire, England, about 4.5 miles (7 km) northeast of the centre of Oxford. The village is 330 feet (100 m) above sea level on the eastern brow of a group of hills northeast of Oxford, in a slight saddle between two of the hills.

== Archaeology ==
The course of the former Roman road that linked Dorchester on Thames with Alchester passes through the western part of the parish. In 1953 excavations up to 300 yards (270 m) east of the parish church found evidence of Roman occupation.

== Manor ==
The Domesday Book records that in 1086 William the Conqueror's half-brother Odo, Bishop of Bayeux held the manor of Stanton St John and Ilbert de Lacy was his principal tenant. De Lacy also held the manor in the adjacent parish of Forest Hill, but in about 1100 de Lacy's son forfeited both manors. After 1526 the manor of the village was granted to New College, Oxford.

== Parish church ==
The Church of England parish church of Saint John the Baptist was built in the 12th century. The arcade between the nave and north aisle dates from this period and is in the Transitional style between Norman architecture and Early English Gothic. The chancel arch is also Transitional, but may have been rebuilt in about 1700. The chancel was rebuilt around the beginning of the 14th century and is a high quality example of the transition from Early English (its side windows) to the Decorated Gothic (its east window, which has unusual tracery). The south aisle was built late in the 14th century, with a clerestory above its arcade to light the nave.

In the 15th century all but one of the windows in the north aisle were replaced with Perpendicular Gothic ones and the bell tower was built. The church furniture includes four early 16th century benches whose bench ends have unusual carvings of poppyheads, human heads and grotesque animals. The tower has a ring of five bells. Ellis and Francis Knight of Reading cast the treble and fourth bells in 1652. Michael Darbie, an itinerant bellfounder, cast the third bell in 1656. Henry III Bagley of Chacombe, Northamptonshire cast the second bell in 1716, possibly at his foundry at Witney. Abraham II Rudhall of Gloucester cast the tenor bell in 1724, completing the current ring.

== Economic and social history ==
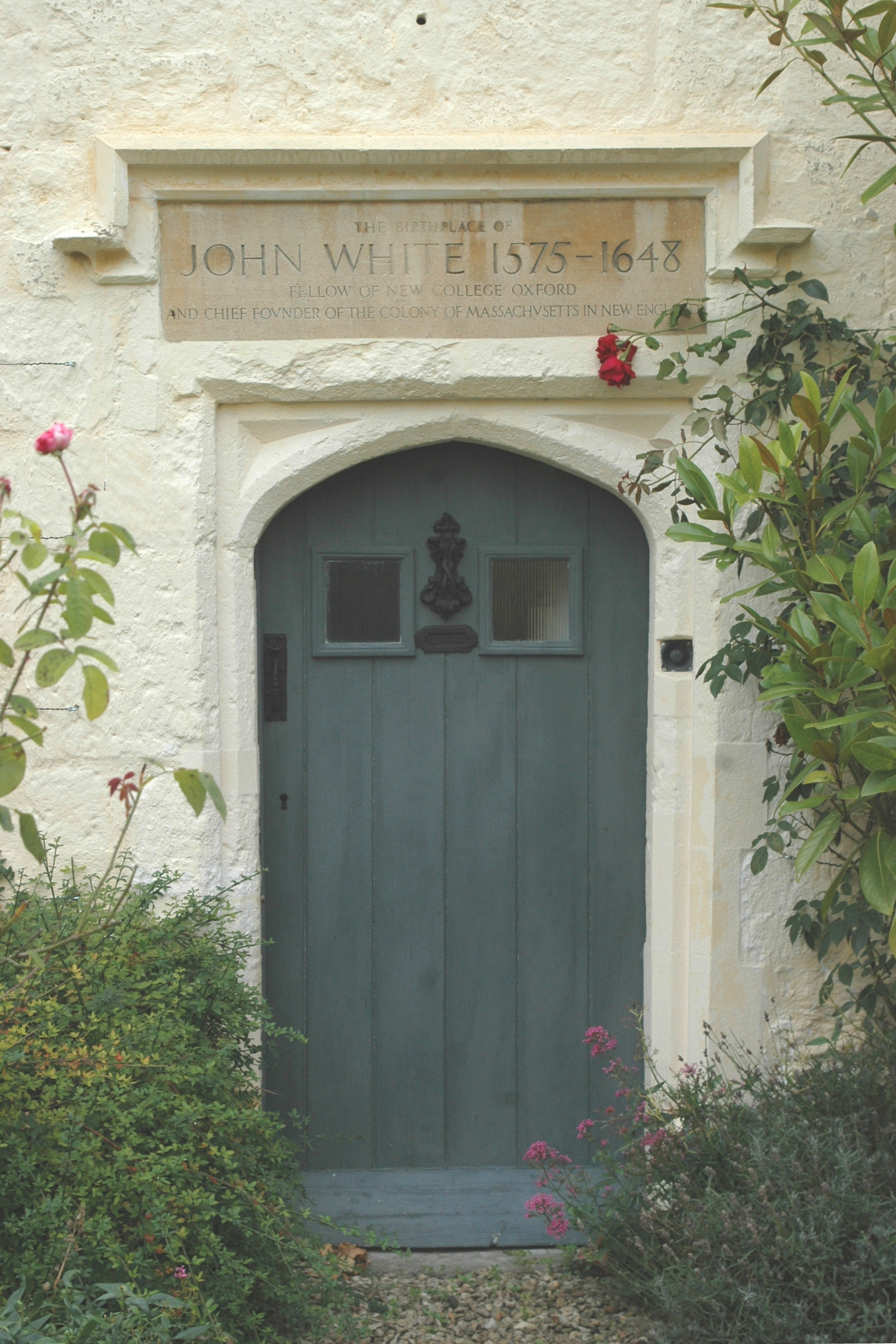
Front door to John White's house

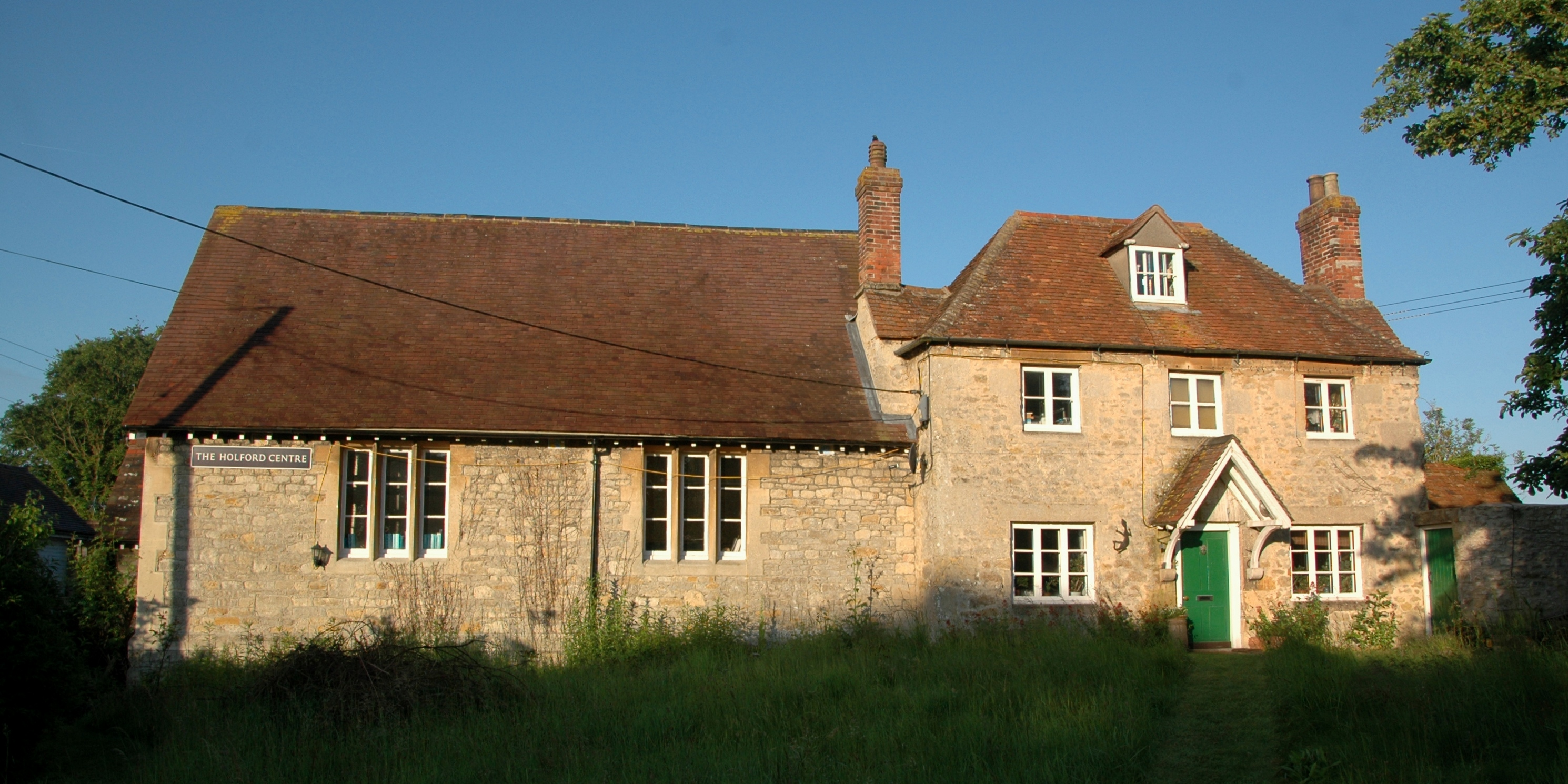
The Holford Centre, formerly the parish school. On the right is the 18th-century teacher's house; on the left are the classrooms built in 1874

The village retains several 16th and 17th stone-built houses, including Manor Farm and John White's house. The Puritan minister John White (1575–1648) was born here. He was the vicar of Dorchester, Dorset, and was nicknamed the "Patriarch of Dorchester". White was instrumental in founding the New England colony of Massachusetts. A later John White ran Manor Farm on behalf of New College, and repaired the Manor Farm house in 1660.

During the English Civil War, Royalist troops were stationed in the village in 1643 and 1644 as part of the defence of Oxford against Parliamentarian forces to the east. In 1646 Parliamentarian troops occupied the village during the siege of Oxford. An open field system of farming originally predominated in the parish. By 1706 a number of fields had been enclosed, but more than 400 acres (160 ha) of common land remained until they were enclosed by an Act of Parliament in 1777.

In 1717 Dame Elizabeth Holford left a bequest to be invested until it was large enough to endow a free school for the parish. Trustees to set up the school were appointed in 1759 and it started teaching in the vicarage in 1764. A school was built on land provided by New College and completed in 1767. In 1874 the schoolrooms were demolished and rebuilt to comply with the Elementary Education Act 1870. By the 1950s the school was a Church of England primary school. The school closed in 1984 and became the Holford Centre in 1989. It is now used by a pre-school and for other educational purposes.

== In literature ==
Stanton St John and its surrounding area are the setting for Gladys Mitchell's detective novel 'Dead Men's Morris', featuring her series detective Dame Beatrice Adela Lestrange Bradley. Many real locations are mentioned, including Stanton Great Wood, the church and the nearby Forest Hill and Shotover Hill. Pig-rearing plays an important part in the book, and piggeries can be found in the neighbourhood.

== Amenities ==
Stanton St John has a village shop and a Women's Institute. Stanton St John has two public houses:

- The Star Inn controlled by Wadworth Brewery is currently shut;
- The Talkhouse controlled by Fuller's Brewery.

== Notable people ==
- Hubert Bassett (1867–1943), cricketer
- John White (1575–1648), priest and colonist

== Gallery ==
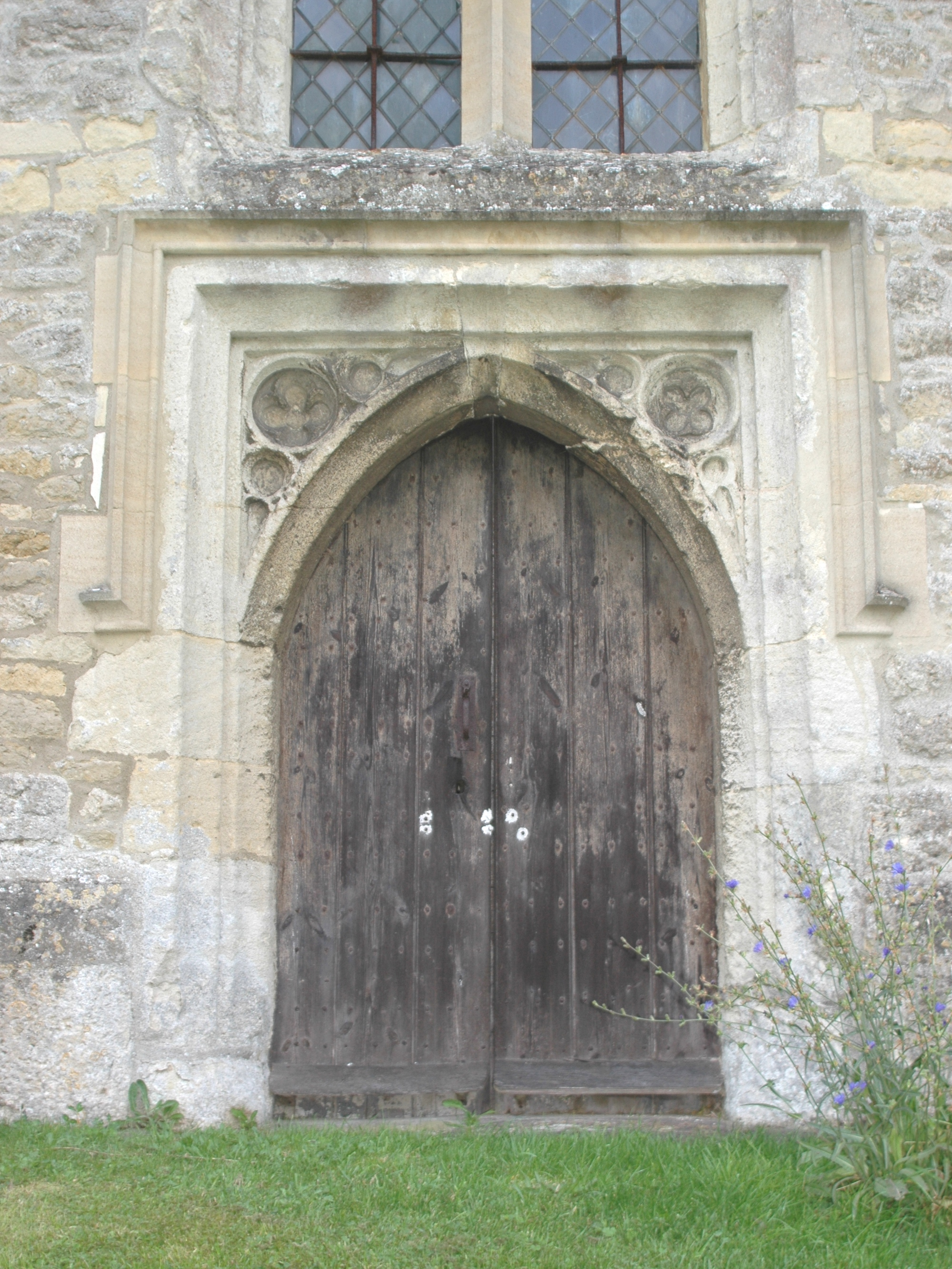
St John the Baptist parish church: west door to the tower

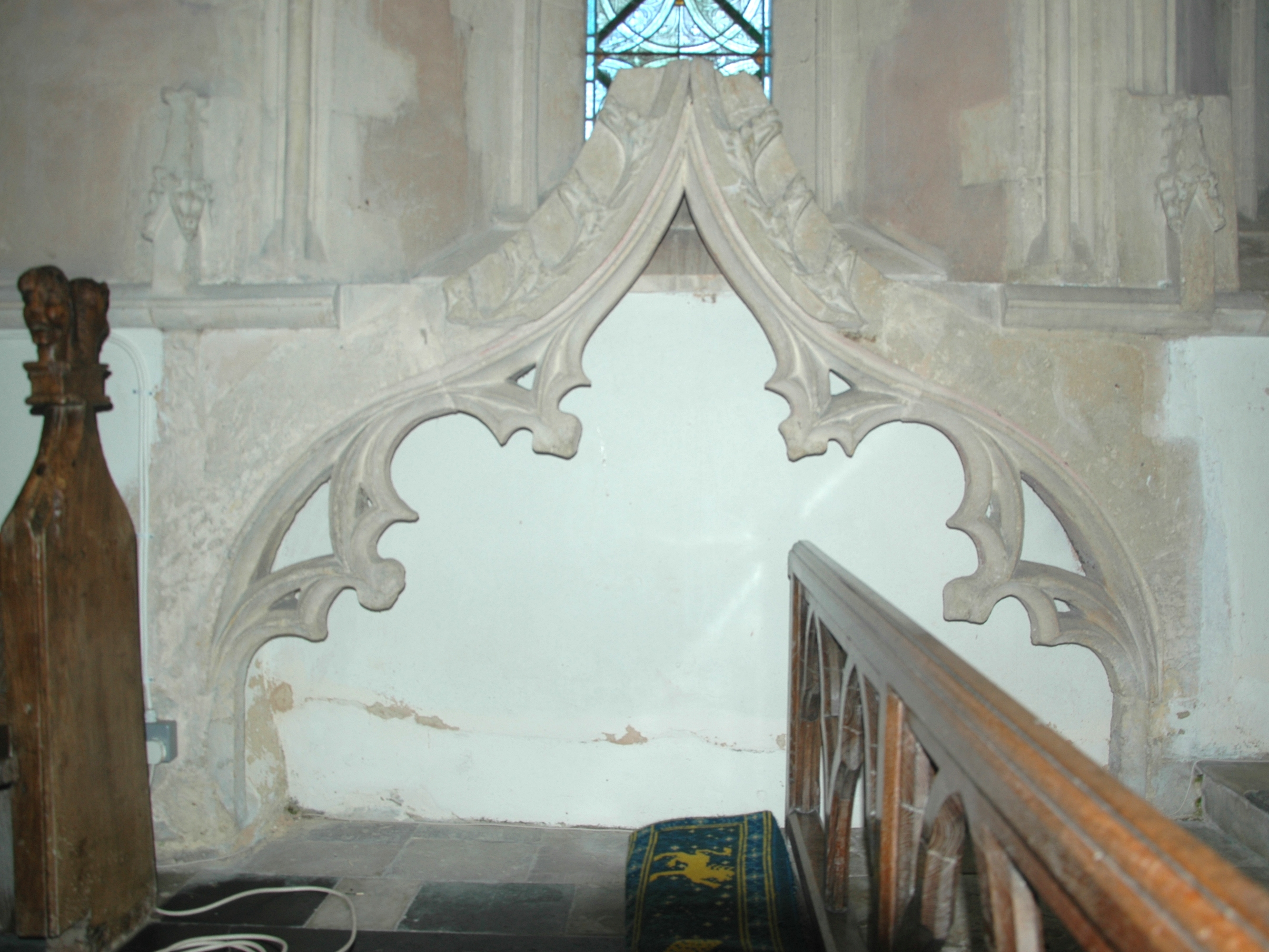
St John the Baptist parish church: Decorated Gothic recess in the chancel with ogees, cusps and crockets

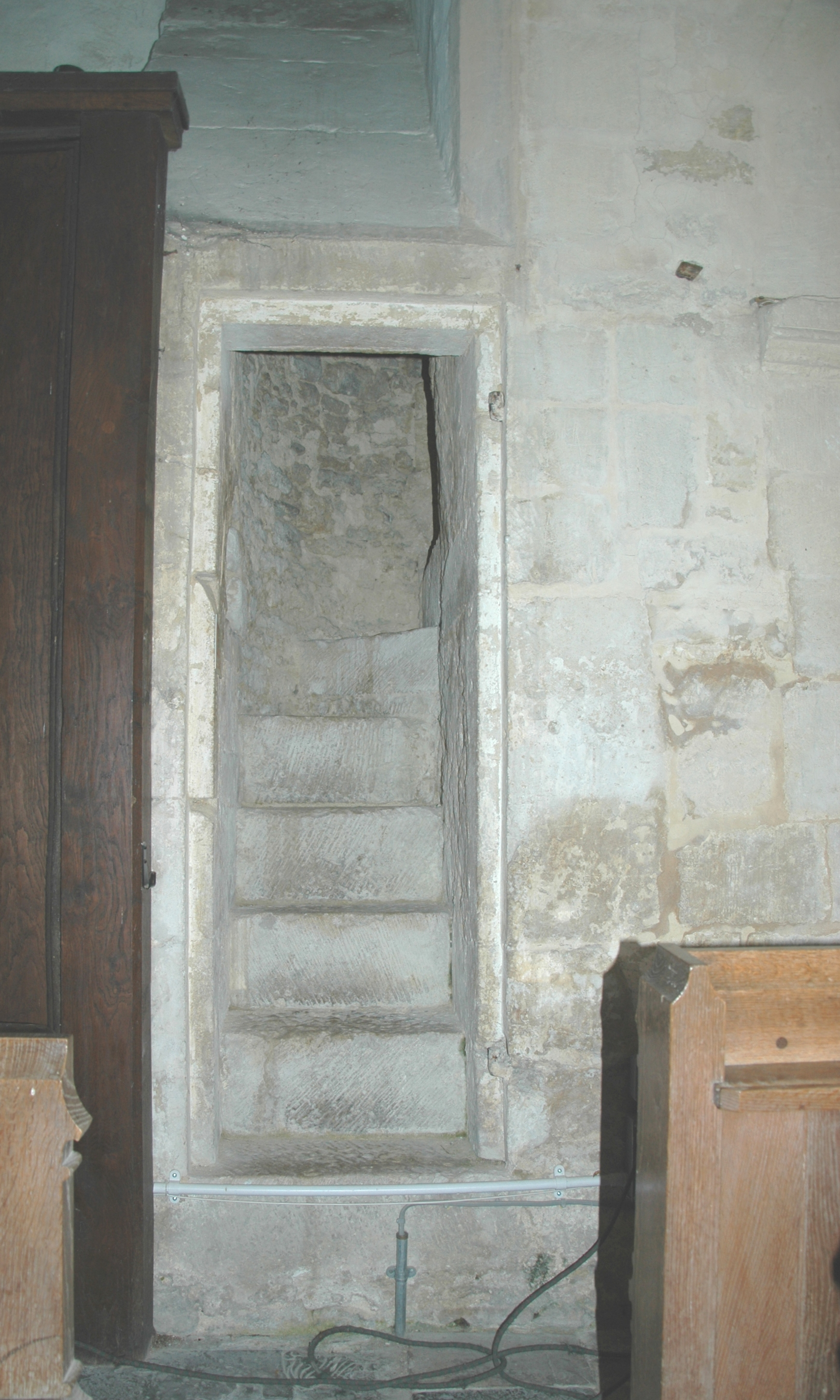
St John the Baptist parish church: stairway to former rood loft

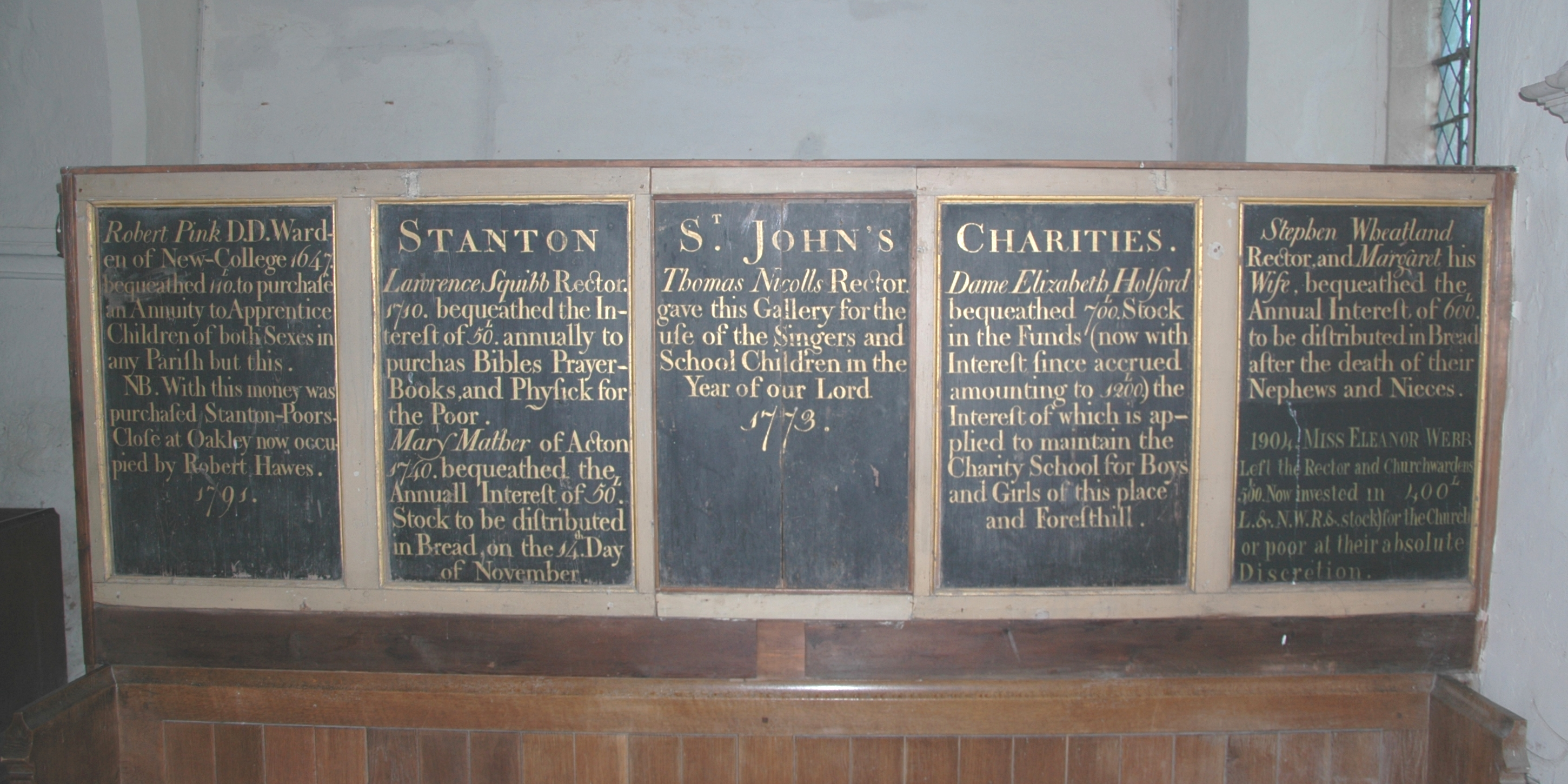
St John the Baptist parish church: 18th-century parish charity board

== See also ==
- Courtrai Chest, found in the village

== Sources and further reading ==
- Gilmour, Nigel (2004). "The Medieval Manor at Stanton St John: A 700th Anniversary?". Oxoniensia. LXXV. Oxfordshire Architectural and Historical Society: 51–91. ISSN 0308-5562.
- Lobel, Mary D, ed. (1957). "Stanford St John". A History of the County of Oxford. Victoria County History. Vol. 5: Bullingdon Hundred. pp. 56–76.
- Sherwood, Jennifer; Pevsner, Nikolaus (1974). Oxfordshire. The Buildings of England. Harmondsworth: Penguin Books. pp. 784–785. ISBN 0-14-071045-0.
- Mitchell, Gladys (1936). Dead Men's Morris. London: Michael Joseph Ltd.
