= Bassitt =

Bassitt is a surname of Norman origin, originating as a surname for someone of small stature. Notable people with the surname include:

- Chris Bassitt (born 1989), American professional baseball pitcher
- Trevor Bassitt (born 1998), American track and field athlete

== See also ==
- Bady Bassitt, a municipality in the state of São Paulo, Brazil
- Bassett (surname)
