= Yves Chauvin =

French chemist and Nobel Prize laureate

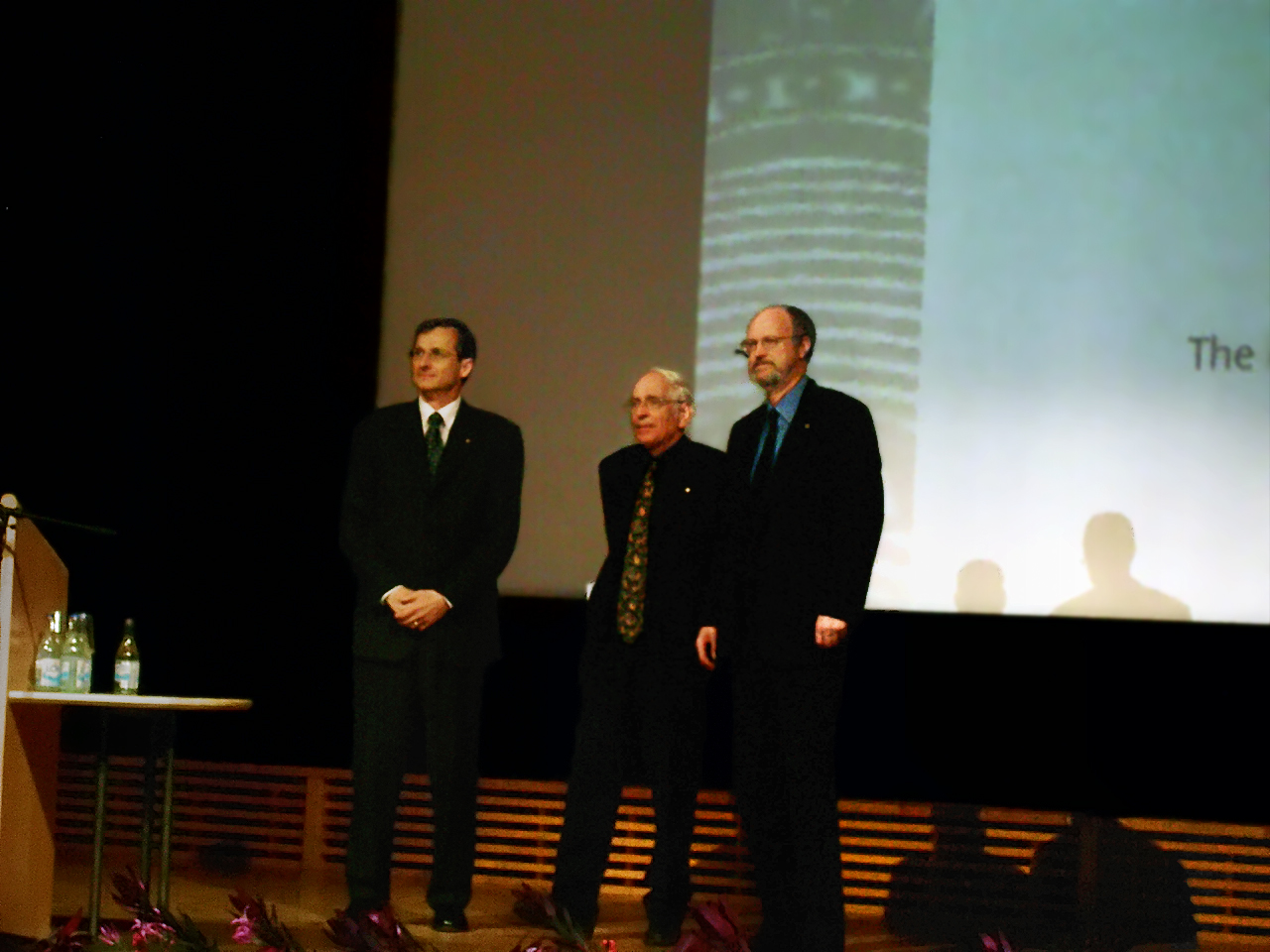
- Nobel Laureates in Chemistry 2005 on stage
- Born: 10 October 1930; Menen, Belgium
- Died: 27 January 2015 (aged 84); Tours, France
- Education: École supérieure de chimie physique électronique de Lyon
- Known for: Deciphering the process of olefin metathesis
- Awards: Nobel Prize in Chemistry (2005)
- Scientific career
- Workplaces: French Institute of Petroleum

Yves Chauvin (French: [iv ʃovɛ̃]; 10 October 1930 – 27 January 2015) was a French chemist and Nobel Prize laureate. He was honorary research director at the Institut français du pétrole and a member of the French Academy of Sciences. He was known for his work for deciphering the process of olefin metathesis for which he was awarded the 2005 Nobel Prize in Chemistry along with Robert H. Grubbs and Richard R. Schrock.

== Life ==
Yves Chauvin was born on 10 October 1930 in Menen, Belgium, to French parents; his father worked as an electrical engineer. He graduated in 1954 from the École supérieure de chimie physique électronique de Lyon. He began working in the chemical industry but was frustrated there. He is quoted as saying, "If you want to find something new, look for something new...there is a certain amount of risk in this attitude, as even the slightest failure tends to be resounding, but you are so happy when you succeed that it is worth taking the risk." In 1960, Chauvin began working for the French Petroleum Institute in Rueil-Malmaison. He became honorary director of research there following his retirement from the institute in 1995. Chauvin also served as an emeritus (retired) director of research at the Lyon School of Chemistry, Physics, and Electronics.

== Awards and recognitions ==
He was awarded the 2005 Nobel Prize in Chemistry, along with Robert H. Grubbs and Richard R. Schrock, for his work from the early 1970s in the area of olefin metathesis. Chauvin was embarrassed to receive his award and initially indicated that he might not accept it. He did however receive his award from the King of Sweden and deliver his Nobel lecture. He was elected a member of the French Academy of Sciences in 2005.

== Research ==
Chauvin's work centred on metathesis, which involves organic (carbon-based) compounds. In metathesis, chemists break double bonds more easily by introducing a catalyst—that is, a substance that starts or speeds up a chemical reaction. Chemists began performing metathesis in the 1950s without knowing exactly how the reaction worked. This lack of understanding hindered the search for more efficient catalysts.

In the early 1970s Chauvin achieved a breakthrough when he described the mechanism by which a metal atom bound to a carbon atom in one group of atoms causes the group to shift places with a group of atoms in another molecule and explained metathesis in detail. He showed that the reaction involves two double bonds. One of the double bonds connects two parts of an organic molecule. The other double bond connects a metal-based catalyst to a fragment of an organic molecule. In metathesis, these two double bonds combine and split to make four single bonds. The single bonds form a ring that connects the metal catalyst, the organic fragment, and the two parts of the organic molecule. The metal catalyst then breaks off from the ring, carrying away part of the organic molecule. This process leaves the fragment attached to the remainder of the organic molecule with a double bond, forming a new organic compound. Scholars have compared this reaction to a dance in which two sets of partners join hands to form a ring and then split apart again to form two new partnerships.

Chauvin's description of metathesis led Robert H. Grubbs and Richard R. Schrock to develop catalysts that carried out the reaction more efficiently. The three chemists' work has enabled manufacturers to make organic compounds, including some plastics and medicines, using less energy because the required reaction pressures and temperatures became lower, and using fewer harmful and expensive chemicals, and creating fewer contaminant reaction by-products and hazardous waste that must be extracted from the desired synthetic. It was for this process they were awarded with 2005 Chemistry Nobel Prize.

== Death ==
Chauvin died, at the age of 84, on 27 January 2015 in Tours, France.

== Publications ==
- Yves Chauvin (2006). "Olefin Metathesis: The Early Days (Nobel Lecture)". Angew. Chem. Int. Ed. 45 (23): 3740–3747. Bibcode:2006ACIE...45.3740C. doi:10.1002/anie.200601234. PMID 16724296.
- Martinato, A.; Chauvin, Y.; Lefebvre, G. (1964). "Kinetic aspects of the "period of adjustment" during polymerization (of propylene) with titanium trichloride-triethylaluminium, "Title". Comptes Rendus. 258 (17): 4271–4273.
- Uchino, M.; Chauvin, Y.; Lefebvre, G. (1967). "Dimerization of propylene by nickel complexes". Comptes Rendus de l'Académie des Sciences, Série C. 265 (2): 103–106.
- Herisson, J. L.; Chauvin, Y. (1971). "Catalysis of olefin transformations by tungsten complexes. II. Telomerization of cyclic olefins in the presence of acyclic olefins". Makromol. Chem. 141: 161–176. doi:10.1002/macp.1971.021410112. (This article is occasionally cited as 1970 as the year of publication due to a typographical error in the original publication.)
- Chauvin, Y.; Gilbert, B.; Guibard, I. (1990). "Catalytic dimerization of alkenes by nickel complexes in organochloroaluminate molten salts". Chem. Comm. 23 (23): 1715–1716. doi:10.1039/c39900001715. S2CID 94961900.
- Magna, L.; Niccolai, G. P.; Chauvin, Y.; Basset, J.-M. (2003). "The importance of imidazolium substituents in the use of imidazolium based room temperature ionic liquids as solvents for palladium catalyzed telomerization of butadiene with methanol". Organometallics. 22 (22): 4418–4425. doi:10.1021/om021057s.
