= Senator Bassett (disambiguation) =

Richard Bassett (Delaware politician) (1745–1815) was a U.S. Senator from Delaware. Senator Bassett may also refer to:

- Burwell Bassett (1764–1840), Virginia State Senate
- Carol A.M. Bassett (fl. 2000s–2010s), Senate of Bermuda
- Charlie Bassett (1847–1896), saloon owner in the American Old West nicknamed "Senator"
