= Hubert Bassett =

English cricketer

Personal information
- Full name: Hubert Bassett
- Born: 5 October 1867; Stanton St John, Oxfordshire, England
- Died: 13 June 1943 (aged 75); Oxford, Oxfordshire, England
- Batting: Left-handed
- Bowling: Left-arm medium

Domestic team information
- Years: Team
- 1888–1891: Oxford University
- 1895–1906: Oxfordshire
- 1908–1914: Suffolk

Career statistics
| Competition | First-class |
|---|---|
| Matches | 21 |
| Runs scored | 292 |
| Batting average | 8.84 |
| 100s/50s | –/1 |
| Top score | 54* |
| Balls bowled | 4,589 |
| Wickets | 78 |
| Bowling average | 22.07 |
| 5 wickets in innings | 4 |
| 10 wickets in match | – |
| Best bowling | 6/50 |
| Catches/stumpings | 15/– |
- Source: Cricinfo, 24 June 2019

Hubert Bassett (5 October 1867 – 13 June 1943) was an English first-class cricketer.

Bassett was born at Stanton St. John in South Oxfordshire in October 1867. He was educated in Oxford at the Bedford House School, before going up to St Catherine's College, Oxford. While studying at Oxford he made his debut in first-class cricket for Oxford University against the touring Australians at Oxford in 1888. He played first-class cricket for Oxford until 1891, making a total of 21 first-class appearances. His left-arm medium bowling delivered him 78 wickets in his 21 matches, taken at an average of 22.07, with best figures of 6 for 50. One of four five wicket hauls he took, his best figures came against Lancashire in 1889. A useful lower-order batsman, Bassett scored 292 runs at an average of 8.84, with a high score of 54 not out. His time playing for Oxford University coincided with a lean period for the team, winning only twice in his 32 appearances for the team (in both first-class and minor matches).

Bassett later appeared in minor counties cricket for Oxfordshire, playing for the county in the Minor Counties Championship between 1895–1906, making sixty appearances. He later played for Suffolk in the Minor Counties Championship between 1908–14, making sixteen appearances. Outside of cricket, Bassett worked as a teacher. He died at Oxford in June 1943.
