= Jean Michel Bassot =

French footballer (born 1959)

Personal information
- Full name: Jean Michel Bassot
- Date of birth: 29 January 1959 (age 67)
- Place of birth: Vichy, France
- Height: 1.83 m (6 ft 0 in)
- Position: Midfielder

Senior career*
Years	Team	Apps	(Gls)
1978–1979	INF Vichy	?	(?)
1979–1984	Tours	48	(1)
1984–1985	Valence	21	(2)
1985–1987	Chamois Niortais	54	(6)
1987–1988	Tours	15	(0)
- * Club domestic league appearances and goals

Jean Michel Bassot (French: [ʒɑ̃ miʃɛl baso]; born 29 January 1959) is a former professional footballer who played as a midfielder.
