= John Spencer Bassett =

American historian (1867–1928)

- Bassett in 1891
- Born: September 10, 1867; Tarboro, North Carolina, U.S.
- Died: January 28, 1928 (aged 60); Washington, D.C., U.S.
- Education: Trinity College; Johns Hopkins University
- Occupations: Professor, historian
- Employer(s): Trinity College, Smith College
- Spouse: Jessie Lewellin (1866–1950) (m. 1892)
- Children: 2, including Richard H. Bassett

John Spencer Bassett (September 10, 1867 – January 27, 1928) was an American historian. He was a professor at Trinity College (today Duke University), and is best known today for the "Bassett Affair" in 1903 when he publicly criticized racism among Southern elites, and called Booker T. Washington, "all in all the greatest man, save General Lee, born in the South in 100 years." Despite widespread outrage, the college trustees refused to accept Bassett's resignation by a vote of 18 to 7. After Trinity, he became a professor of history at Smith College in Massachusetts. and was the executive director of the American Historical Association for many years.

== Early life and education ==
Bassett was born September 10, 1867, in Tarboro, North Carolina. He was the second of seven children of Richard Baxter Bassett (son of Richard and Caroline Spencer Bassett) who was born September 20, 1832, in Williamsburg, Virginia, and died March 25, 1902, in Goldsboro, North Carolina; and Mary Jane Wilson (daughter of John Wilson and Susannah Dunn of Maine), born November 7, 1845, in Edgecombe County, North Carolina, and died September 1, 1903, in Durham, North Carolina. Both of his parents are buried in Willow Dale Cemetery in Goldsboro, Wayne County, North Carolina.

He entered Trinity College (now Duke University) in 1886, as a junior, graduating with an A.B. in history. In 1894 he earned a Ph.D. in history from Johns Hopkins University, under the direction of Herbert Baxter Adams. As one of the first PhD's trained at Johns Hopkins University in Baltimore, he was introduced to a new, research-based higher education.

== Career ==
=== The Bassett Affair ===
President Roosevelt praised the university.

In 1902 Bassett launched the South Atlantic Quarterly, a journal whose purpose was to promote the "literary, historical, and social development of the South." It was from this journal that Bassett began to challenge more aggressively the southern press and prevailing sentiments about southern history and issues revolving around race. In October 1903 he published an article in the South Atlantic Quarterly titled "Stirring Up the Fires of Racial Antipathy" triggering a controversy that nearly cost the young professor his job. In the article, he spoke about improving race relations and gave praise to numerous African Americans. Near the end of the article, he wrote "...Booker T. Washington [is] the greatest man, save General Lee, born in the South in a hundred years..."

This led to an outpouring of anger from powerful Democratic Party leaders as well as the media and public. The most vociferous of which was the Raleigh News and Observer and its editor, Josephus Daniels. Many demanded that Bassett be fired and encouraged parents to take their children out of the university. Due to immense public pressure, Bassett offered his resignation if the Board of Trustees requested that he do so. The Board of Trustees then held a meeting to decide; in the end, they voted 18-7 not to accept the resignation citing academic freedom. In their decision, they wrote, "We are particularly unwilling to lend ourselves to any tendency to destroy or limit academic liberty, a tendency which has, within recent years, manifested itself in some conspicuous instances, and which has created a feeling of uneasiness for the welfare of American colleges [...] We cannot lend countenance to the degrading notion that professors in American colleges have not an equal liberty of thought and speech with all other Americans." In 1905, President Theodore Roosevelt commended Trinity and Bassett's courageous stand for academic freedom while speaking to the university. He told the school, "You stand for Academic Freedom, for the right of private judgment, for a duty more incumbent upon the scholar than upon any other man, to tell the truth as he sees it, to claim for himself and to give to others the largest liberty in seeking after the truth."

=== Post-affair career ===
In 1906, he became a professor at Smith College in Massachusetts. After 1919, he was the long-time secretary (executive director) of the American Historical Association, and helped to stabilize its finances through an endowment. He was elected a Fellow of the American Academy of Arts and Sciences in 1921.

He wrote numerous books on North Carolina, a major biography of Andrew Jackson, several textbooks, and produced carefully edited editions of important primary sources, most notably his seven volume Correspondence of Andrew Jackson (1926–1935).

== Personal life ==
In Forsyth, North Carolina on August 10, 1892, John Spencer Bassett married Jessie Lewellin. She was born January 31, 1866, in Clarksville, Mecklenburg County, Virginia; died April 3, 1950, in Northampton, Massachusetts. John Spencer Bassett and Jessie Lewellin Bassett are buried in the Bridge Street Cemetery, Northampton, Massachusetts. They had two children:

- Richard Horace Bassett (1900–1995)
- Margaret Byrd Bassett (1902–1982)

His sister Bessie Wilson Bassett married Trinity College Librarian Joseph Penn Breedlove in 1905. Bassett died 27 January 1928 in Washington, DC.

=== Memorials ===
- A freshman residence hall on Duke's East Campus is named for Bassett.
