= Spencer Bassett =

English footballer

Personal information
- Full name: Spencer Thomas Bassett
- Date of birth: 4 September 1885
- Place of birth: Blackheath, England
- Date of death: 11 April 1917 (aged 31)
- Place of death: near Bullecourt, France
- Position: Right half

Senior career*
Years	Team	Apps	(Gls)
- North Kent United
–1903	Eltham United		
1903–1906	Maidstone United		
1906–1910	Woolwich Arsenal	1	(0)
1910–1913	Exeter City	81	(3)
1913–1914	Swansea Town		
1914–1915	Southend United		
- * Club domestic league appearances and goals

Spencer Thomas Bassett (4 September 1885 – 11 April 1917) was an English professional football who played as a right half in the Southern League for Exeter City, Swansea Town and Southend United. He made one appearance in the Football League for Woolwich Arsenal.

== Personal life ==
Bassett attended Earl Street School, near to the Manor Ground. He served as an acting bombardier in the Royal Garrison Artillery during the First World War. On 11 April 1917, Bassett and his unit were at the Arras frontline, providing heavy artillery support for the attack on the village of Bullecourt. During a German counter-shelling, Bassett was mortally wounded and died at the rear of the frontlines. He was buried in Pozières British Cemetery, Ovillers-la-Boisselle.

== Career statistics ==
Appearances and goals by club, season and competition
Club	Season	League			FA Cup		Total	
Club	Season	Division	Apps	Goals	Apps	Goals	Apps	Goals
Woolwich Arsenal	1909–10	First Division	1	0	0	0	1	0
Career total			1	0	0	0	1	0
