= René Basset =

French linguist and orientalist (1855–1924)

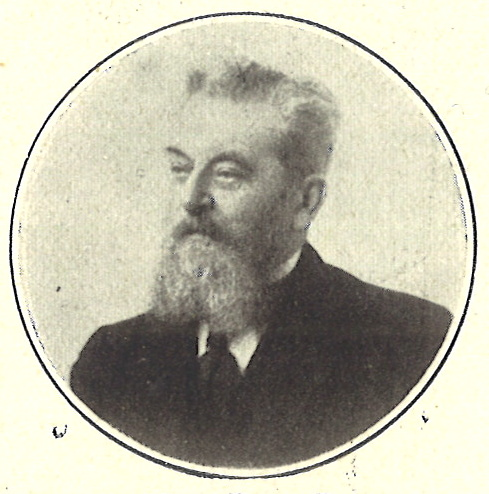
- Born: 24 July 1855; Lunéville
- Died: 4 January 1924 (aged 68); Algiers
- Occupation: Linguist

René Basset (24 July 1855 – 4 January 1924) was a French orientalist, specialist of the Berber language and the Arabic language.

== Biography ==
Letter from Basset to Snouck Hurgronje (1911)

René Basset was the first director of the "École des lettres d'Alger" created in 1879 during the French colonisation of Algeria.

A member of the société Asiatique of Paris as well as those of Leipzig and Florence, he collaborated with the Journal Asiatique and studied Chinese Islam.

André Basset and Henri Basset were his sons.

== Publications ==
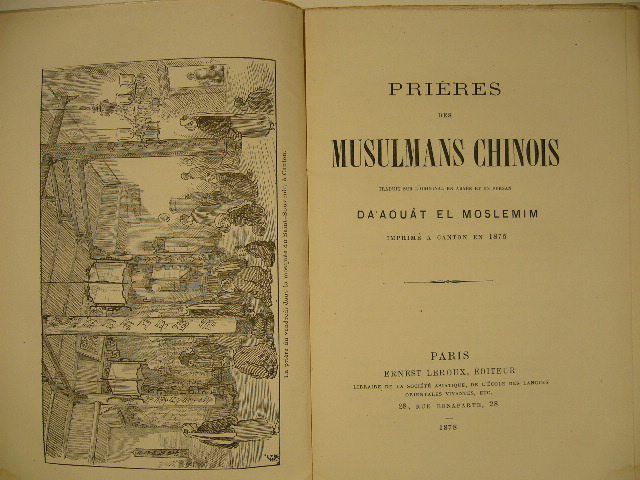
Cover of the Chinese Muslim prayers book

- Étude sur la zenatia du Mzab
- Notes de lexicographie berbère, 1887. sur le site Archive
- La Religion des Berbères de l’antiquité jusqu’à l'Islam, Les Belles Lettres ISBN 978-9931-328-03-2
- Prières des musulmans chinois, Éditions Ernest Leroux, 1878
- Les Manuscrits arabes de la Zaouia d'El Hamel, Etablissement typographique Florentin, 1897
- Recherches sur la religion des Berbères, 1910.
- Son anthologie Mille et un contes, récits et légendes arabes a été rééditée sous la direction de Aboubakr Chraïbi, chez José Corti, Collection Merveilleux n° 29, 2005, 2 tomes, 504 et 702 p. (édition originale parue en 1924 chez Maisonneuve frères). ISBN 2-7143-0858-9

== Honours ==
- Commandeur of the Légion d'honneur
- Officiere of the Ordre des Palmes Académiques
- Grand-officier of the Nichan Iftikhar
- Commandeur of the Order of Menelik II
- Chevalier of the Order of St. Sylvester

== Bibliography ==
- Qui êtes-vous ? Annuaire des contemporains. Notices biographiques (in French). Paris: C. Delagrave. 1924. p. 44..
- Guy Basset, « Basset, René (1855-1924) », in L'Algérie et la France, (p. 96–97)
