= French Institute of Petroleum =

French public research organisation

The IFP Energies nouvelles (IFPEN) also known as French Institute of Petroleum (in French: Institut Français du Pétrole, IFP) is a public research organisation in France founded in 1944 as Institute of Oil, Fuels and Lubricants (Institut du pétrole, des carburants et des lubrifiants).

The Institute is based at Rueil-Malmaison near Paris, and has sites near Lyon and at Pau. As of 2004, it had 1729 employees, a budget of 253 million euros, and was responsible for a post-graduate training centre, IFP School (also known as the ENSPM - École Nationale Supérieure du Pétrole et des Moteurs), and an extensive industrial training programme, IFP Training.

IFPEN has designed several methods to assess the oil potential of a sedimentary rock, amongst others, the Rock-Eval Pyrolysis technique using a standardized pyrolysis apparatus. This technique is used worldwide amongst petroleum companies to compare their results in the same way.

== Noted researchers ==
- Yves Chauvin, co-laureate of the 2005 Nobel Prize in Chemistry.
