= Richard H. Bassett =

American painter

Richard Horace Bassett
- Born: February 21, 1900; Durham, North Carolina, US
- Died: February 6, 1995 (aged 94); Milton, Massachusetts, US
- Education: Phillips Academy; Harvard College
- Occupation: Impressionist painter
- Spouses: Henrietta Durant; Claire Birge (m. 1966; died 1990); Eleanor Scott (m. 1992)
- Children: 1
- Father: John Spencer Bassett

Richard Horace Bassett (February 21, 1900 – February 6, 1995) was an American impressionist and was the founder and head of the Milton Academy Art Department in Milton, Massachusetts, from 1945 to 1965. He studied extensively in Europe and in the United States and had several one man and group shows in prominent galleries in New York and Boston including the Grace Horne Gallery on Newbury Street and Ferargil Galleries in New York. His career spanned over 80 years and in addition to the art he produced he is also noted for his contributions to the methodology of teaching art in school systems.

== Early life ==
Richard H. Bassett was born February 21, 1900, on the campus of Trinity College, now known as Duke University, in Durham, North Carolina. He was the son of the prominent historian John Spencer Bassett (1867–1928) and Jessie Lewellin (1866–1950). His only sibling was Margaret Byrd Bassett (1902–1982), an author.

In 1906, the family moved to Northampton, Massachusetts, after John Spencer Bassett published a controversial article supporting equal rights of African Americans and was forced by pressure from politicians to resign his position. Northampton remained as a base for Richard Bassett until the family home was sold in 1959. Bassett attended the Phillips Academy in Andover, Massachusetts.

=== Education and training ===
In the spring of 1911, Bassett moved with his mother, Jessie Lewellin Bassett, to Vevey, Switzerland, where he was enrolled in private school and began studies with the Swiss painter Henri Edouard Bercher, a graduate of the Ecole des Beaux-Arts in Geneva and a frequent exhibitor of landscapes at the Suisse Salon des Beaux-Arts. In 1912, they moved to Paris where Bassett, a twelve-year-old, impressed the British painter Percyval Tudor-Hart with the fact that he had already learned to draw better than many of Tudor-Hart's much older students. Bassett, therefore, was invited to enter the academy at 69 Rue d'Assas in Montparnasse. Among Tudor-Hart's other students were New Zealand-born Owen Merton and the Englishman James Wood.

After returning from Europe, Bassett attended Harvard College, where he trained with the painter Martin Mower and Professor Denman Ross, studying Ross's Theory. In 1918, he entered the United States Army, stationed at Harvard Yard. During his fourth year at Harvard, Bassett returned to his studies with Tudor-Hart who had moved his academy to London. Bassett returned to Harvard in 1920, only long enough to receive his B.A. (cum laude).

== Career ==
After graduating in 1920, Bassett lived abroad and studied art for four years in Paris, London and Florence. He again returned to London where he continued to study with Tudor-Hart, whom Bassett called "difficult but brilliant" until 1923. Tudor-Hart would often suspend school for a month or so to travel, and Bassett took these opportunities to return to Paris and to study at the Academie Colarossi and especially the Grande Chaumiere. He would return to the latter many times throughout his career.

In 1926, he returned to Northampton and established a studio in New York and painted at the Mountain Lake Club in Florida where he worked as an independent mural painter and as an assistant to the mural painter Allyn Cox. During this period Bassett decorated rooms and facades of elaborate houses in New York, Florida, Pennsylvania and Massachusetts. In 1937 he had a one-man show at Feragil Galleries in New York City. During this period Bassett studied drawing with George Bridgman at the Art Students League of New York. In 1937, after his marriage to Henrietta Durant of Charleston, South Carolina, Bassett and his new wife moved to Boston, where he had five one-man shows in and around Newbury Street in the next few years, three of them in the prestigious Grace Horne Gallery. During this period he was living at Champney Place on Beacon Hill. This was a productive time for paintings of Boston, Charlestown, Cambridge, Chelsea and East Boston which explored the bleak vistas of the urban American Scene in the latter years of the Depression. He also exhibited at the Gloucester Society of Artists, Inc. numerous times including the Forty Second Exhibition of Paintings and Sculpture alongside Eliot J. Enneking, Gordon Grant, Charles Gruppe and several other prominent artists.

In 1945, Bassett founded and became head of the art department at Milton Academy in Milton, Massachusetts. He taught fine art courses and art history until his retirement twenty years later. Bassett also served as Chairman for the Art Committee of the National Association of Independent Schools. In 1969 Bassett served as editor and an author of a full-length text for the Massachusetts Institute of Technology Press, along with other distinguished collaborators, on the teaching of art in school systems.

In 1992, at the age of 92, he visited Paris again on his own and took a stool at the Academie de la Grande Chaumiere. He noted that although the fees for sitting in on the life class had gone up over twenty times since he had first taken his seat there in the 1910s he still felt "at home".

== Personal life ==
Bassett lived in Milton, Massachusetts, and was active in the artworld until his death on February 6, 1995. A prolific painter, Bassett produced a large body of work that until 2011 was closely held by his estate.

Bassett was first married to Henrietta Durant. The marriage ended in divorce. Together, they had a son, Edward Bassett.

In 1966, Bassett married Claire Albright (née Birge).

In the 1930s, Bassett had a "whirlwind" romance with Eleanor Scott between Philadelphia and Europe. She ended the relationship in order to finish medical school. She received her medical degree in 1935 from Cornell University, where she was one of only four women in her medical school class. She went on to become a longtime Baltimore physician and advocate of women's health issues and rights. The two had corresponded over the years, and in 1992 Dr. Scott traveled to Boston, where they were reunited. They married that year, Basset was 92 and Scott was 83. They remained married until his death in 1995.
