= Francis Basset =

Francis Basset may refer to:

- Francis Basset (1674–1721), MP for Mitchell
- Francis Basset (1715–1769), Cornish landowner and politician
- Francis Basset (1740–1802), MP for Barnstaple 1780–1784
- Francis Basset, 1st Baron de Dunstanville (1757–1835), his son, the first of the Barons Basset

== See also ==
- Francis Bassett (died 1645), Royalist army officer
- Francis Bassett (MP) (1820–1899), British Liberal politician
- Frances Basset, 2nd Baroness Basset (1781–1855), British peeress
