= William Basset (divine) =

William Basset (1644–1695) was an English divine.

Basset was the son of Thomas Basset, minister of Great Harborough in Warwickshire, was baptised there 22 October 1644, became a commoner of Magdalen Hall, Oxford, in 1660, and afterwards a demy of Magdalen College, also at the University of Oxford. He graduated M.A., and took orders, was beneficed first in Surrey, afterwards (1671) at Brinklow in his native county, and in July 1683 was presented by the Salters' Company to the rectory of St Swithin in London. His death occurred in the beginning of the year 1695–6, as he was succeeded on 25 March 1696 in his rectory of St Swithin by John Clark, M.A.

== Works ==
In addition to several sermons, he published:

- 'Two Letters on Alterations in the Liturgy.'
- A 'Vindication' of the previous work, 1689.
- 'An Answer to the Brief History of the Unitarians, called also Socinians,’ London, 1693, 8 volumes. John Biddle's 'History,’ to which this is a reply, appeared anonymously in 1687.
