= Ted Bassett =

English footballer (1889–1970)

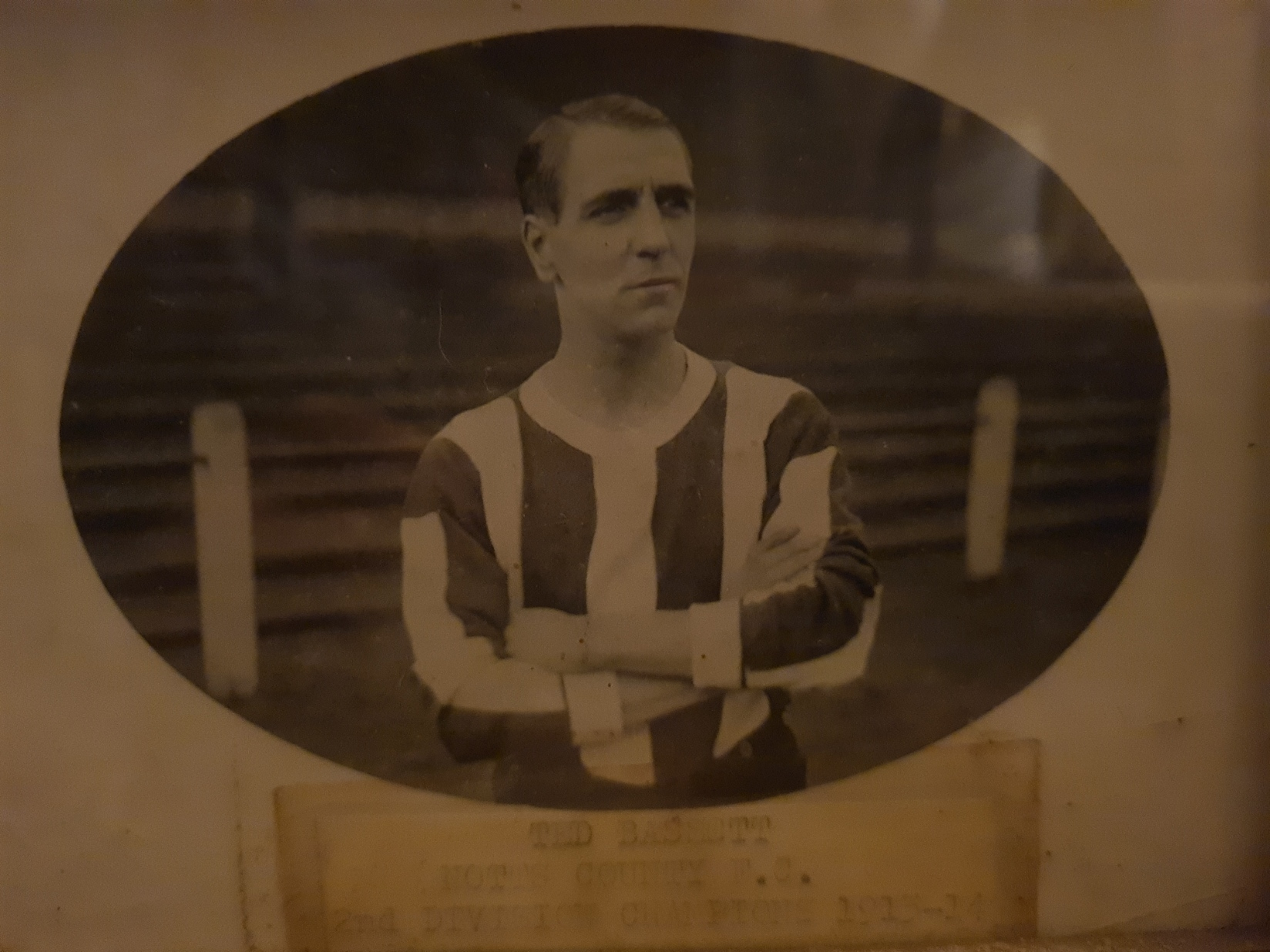

Personal information
- Full name: Edward John Bassett
- Date of birth: 1 January 1889
- Place of birth: Deptford, London, England
- Date of death: 25 November 1970 (aged 81)
- Place of death: Watford, Hertfordshire, England
- Position: Right winger

Youth career
- Deptford Invicta

Senior career*
Years	Team	Apps	(Gls)
1909	Dartford		
1910–1911	Charlton Albion		
1911–1912	Millwall		
1912–1913	Dartford		
1913–1919	Notts County		
1919–1921	Watford	70	(9)
1921–1922	Luton Town		
1922–?	Dartford		
- Fordsons
1930	Cork		
1930–?	Finchley		
- * Club domestic league appearances and goals

Edward John Bassett (1 January 1889 – 25 November 1970) was an English association football winger.

== Career ==
Born and raised in London, Bassett played for a variety of local clubs in his teenage years, including Deptford Invicta, Croydon Common, Metrogas and Charlton Albion. He played for Dartford in the Kent League in 1909, and eventually reached the Southern League with Millwall in 1911. After a brief return to Dartford, Bassett joined Notts County of the Football League Second Division. In his first season at Meadow Lane, County won the league, achieving promotion to the First Division, the highest league in English football. County achieved a sixteenth-placed finish the following season, before league football was suspended due to the First World War. During this time he played as a wartime guest player for London clubs Fulham and Tottenham Hotspur.

On the resumption of peacetime football, Bassett joined Watford, from Hertfordshire. He helped them to a 2nd-placed finish on goal average in 1919–20, and the following year played in their inaugural Football League campaign. He was sold to rivals Luton Town for £200 in 1921, and was reported to the league for demanding a percentage of the fee. After a third and final spell at Dartford in 1922, Bassett moved to the city of Cork, playing in the League of Ireland for Cork before finishing his career in London with Finchley.
