= André Basset =

French linguist and orientalist

- Born: 4 August 1895; Lunéville
- Died: 24 January 1956 (aged 60); Paris
- Occupation: Linguist

André Basset (4 August 1895 – 24 January 1956) was a French linguist. René Basset was his father and Henri Basset his older brother.

== Biography ==
Initially a professor in Rabat, from 1925 to 1928 he was responsible for teaching additional Berber language courses at the Faculty of Arts in Algiers, then taught for just over ten years in the Department of Berber Language and Civilization, from its creation in 1930, at the same faculty. Finally, he taught at the Berber department of the Institut national des langues et civilisations orientales from 1941 to 1956.

He traveled throughout regions where the Berber language is spoken, particularly in Algeria and Morocco, favoring linguistic research as a means of acquiring knowledge, describing dialects, and compiling linguistic atlases noting variations in vocabulary. In 1952, he published a summary of his work, La langue berbère (The Berber Language), with Oxford University Press, and shortly after his death, two volumes of texts he had collected in the Aurès Mountains (among the Aït Frah) and in Morocco were published.

He completed the publication of Charles de Foucauld work on the Tuareg language and civilization, which his father René Basset had begun.

After his death, his library and archives were transferred to the Chair of Berber Studies at the Institut national des langues et civilisations orientales before being donated to the Interuniversity Library of Languages and Civilizations in 1980; they are now kept at the BULAC in Paris. This collection contains more than 1,500 works relating to the Berbers, including the original manuscripts of Charles de Foucauld linguistic works on the Berbers and his correspondence with René Basset

== Bibliography ==
- 1929: La langue berbère. Morphologie. Le verbe: étude de thèmes, Paris, Leroux. [Riedizione Paris, L'Harmattan 2005 - ISBN 2-7475-7278-1 ].
- 1929: Études de géographie linguistique en Kabylie (sur quelques termes berbères concernant le corps, Paris, Leroux.
- 1932: "Note sur l'état d'annexion en berbère", Bulletin de la Société de Linguistique de Paris (BSL), 33 : 173-174.
- 1936: Atlas linguistique des parlers berbères. Algérie. Territoires du nord. Fasc. I, Équidés, Alger (25 carte + 91 pp.).
- 1939: Atlas linguistique des parlers berbères. Algérie. Territoires du nord. Fasc. II, Bovins, Alger (21 carte + 80 pp.).
- 1938: "Le nom de l'étable en Kabylie et la flexion du participe", BSL, 39/2 : 177-178.
- 1942: "Études de géographie linguistique dans le Sud marocain", Hespéris, 3-22.
- 1945: "Sur la voyelle initiale en berbère", Revue africaine, 82-88, repris en 1959, 83-89.
- 1946: "Le système phonologique du berbère", Comptes rendus du Groupe Linguistique d'Études Chamito-Sémitiques (GLECS), 4 (1945-1948), 33-36.
- 1948: Éléments de grammaire berbère (Kabylie - Irjen), with André Picart Alger, La Typo-Litho.
- 1949: "Sur berbère yir 'mauvais' chez les Irjen", Revue africaine, 291-313.
- 1949: "Sur le participe berbère", GLECS, 5 (1948-1951), 34-36.
- 1950: "Sur l'anticipation en berbère", Mélanges William Marçais, Paris, G.P. Maisonneuve, 17-27.
- 1952: La langue berbère, International African Institute, Oxford University Press, London – New York – Toronto (ried. 1959).
- 1954: "n devant complément de nom en berbère", GLECS, 7 (1954-1957), p. 8-12.
- Mémorial André Basset, 1895-1956, Paris, Adrien Maisonneuve, 1957
- 1959: Articles de dialectologie berbère (pref. E. Benveniste), Paris, Klincksieck.
- 1961: Textes berbères de l'Aurès (Parler des Aït Frah), Paris, Adrien-Maisonneuve.
- 1963: Textes berbères du Maroc (parler des Aït Sadden), Paris, Imprimerie nationale – Geuthner.
