= Henri Basset =

- Born: 7 November 1892; Lunéville
- Died: 13 April 1926 (aged 33); Rabat
- Occupations: Linguist; Historian

Henri Basset (7 November 1892 – 13 April 1926) was a French historian, orientalist and linguist and a Berberologist.

== Biography ==
The son of René Basset and elder brother of André Basset, Henri Basset joined the École Normale Supérieure in 1912. A teacher at the "École supérieure de langue arabe et de dialectes berbères" from 1916, he passed his doctorate in 1920 at the faculté de Lettres of Algiers with two works entitled Essai sur la littérature des Berbères and Le culte des grottes au Maroc and was appointed the same year deputy director of the Institut des hautes études marocaines.

== Bibliography ==
- 1920: Essai sur la littérature des Berbères (Paris: Ibis press - Awal, 2001 ISBN 2-910728-21-8)
- 1920: Le culte des grottes au Maroc, Alger: J. Carbonel, (Clichy: Éd. du Jasmin, 1999 ISBN 2-912080-13-4)
- 1921: Graffiti de Chella, Hespéris I with J. Campardou, (p. 87–90), fig.
- 1922: Les rites de la laine à Rabat", Hespéris II, (p. 139–160)
- 1923: Chella. Une nécropole mérinide, with Évariste Lévi-Provençal, Paris, E. Larose
- 1923: Deux pétroglyphes du Maroc Occidental, région des Zaer, Hespéris III, (p. 141–145), 2 pl.
- 1923: Le Nouveau manuscrit berbère : le Kitâb el-mawįẓa, Journal Asiatique. I/299-303
- 1927: La tradition almohade à Marrakech: 1 °. À l'époque mérinide : La mosquée et le minaret de Ben Salîh. Le minaret de Moulay el Ksour : 2 °. À l'époque sa'dienne : La mosquée Mouassin, Hespéris VII, with Henri Terrasse, (p. 247–345), fig., pl.
- 1924: Sanctuaires et forteresses almohades: I. Tinmel : II. Les deux Kotobîya, Hespéris 4, with Henri Terrasse, pp. 9–2, 181-04; III. Le Minaret de la Kotobîya, Hespéris V (1925), (p. 311–376); III. Minaret de la Kotobiya (suite) : IV. Oratoire de la Kotobiya : V. Chaire de la Kotobiya : VI. Mosquée de la Qasba, Hespéris VI (1926), (p. 107–270); Le ribât de Tît : Le Tasghîmout, Hespéris VII (1927), (p. 117–171).
- 1932: Sanctuaires et forteresses almohades, with Henri Terrasse, Paris: Larose, VIII-483 p.
