= William Basset (13th-century judge) =

English judge

William Basset (died c. 1249) was an English judge.

== Life and career ==
Basset was quite possibly the son of Simon Basset of Sapcote, but his lineage is uncertain. He forfeited for the rebellion in 1216 during the First Barons' War, but later restored his allegiance in 1217. He assisted as a justiciar in assessing for Derbyshire and Nottinghamshire in 1225, and was appointed as a justice itinerant for these counties on 27 May 1226. He later appears as a justice itinerant in 1227 and 1232. He died sometime in July 1249, when Robert, his heir, did homage.

Another William Basset was an advocate under Edward II and Edward III, and was elevated to the bench of the Common Pleas about 1337. On 18 October 1341 he was transferred to the King's Bench, where he sat until about 1350.
