= Richard Basset =

12th-century Anglo-Norman nobleman and sheriff

Royal Justice
- In office c. 1120 – c. 1135

Personal details
- Died: between 1135 and 1144
- Spouse: Matilda
- Children: Geoffrey Ridel; Ralph Basset; William Basset; Sibil; Matilda
- Occupation: Royal justice

Richard Basset (died between 1135 and 1144) was a royal judge and sheriff during the reign of King Henry I of England. His father was also a royal justice. In about 1122, Basset married the eventual heiress of another justice; the marriage settlement has survived. In 1129–1130, Basset was co-sheriff of eleven counties. Basset and his wife founded a monastic house in 1125 from their lands, which, before the donation, were equivalent to 15 knight's fees.

== Early life ==
Basset was the son of Ralph Basset, who was a royal justice under Henry I. While it is not known whether Richard was Ralph's eldest son, Richard inherited Ralph's estates in Normandy, which were near Montreuil-au-Houlme. He also inherited his father's English estates at Colston Basset, Kingston Winslow, and Peatling Parva. The bulk of Ralph's English lands did not go to Richard, however. Basset's brother Nicholas signed over his own inheritance to Richard. Ralph Basset was considered one of the "new men" of Henry I. William Basset, the abbot of the Benedictine monastery of the abbey of St Benet of Hulme, may have been a relative, as he granted lands to Richard Basset in return for a £10 annual rent. Another relative may have been the Robert Basset who witnessed nine charters of Ranulf de Gernon, Earl of Chester.

== Royal service ==
In 1125, the king appointed Basset to oversee the lands of Peterborough Abbey after the death of the abbot. The revenues of a vacant abbey went to the king, and Basset's job was to secure Peterborough's income for King Henry.

In 1129–30, Basset served as sheriff of Bedfordshire and Buckinghamshire, Cambridgeshire and Huntingdonshire, Essex, Hertfordshire, Leicestershire, Northamptonshire, Norfolk and Suffolk, and Surrey together with Aubrey de Vere II. The number of shrievalties was unusual and is known from the Pipe Roll of 1130. According to the entries in the Pipe Roll, de Vere and Basset did not function as traditional sheriffs, farming the revenues, but were instead responsible for the entire royal revenue in those counties.

As well as his service as a sheriff, Basset also served as a royal justice, hearing pleas in Leicestershire in 1129 and 1130. Between 1131 and 1133, Basset appears to have been a frequent attendee at the royal court, as he witnessed a number of documents. He was present at the councils held at Northampton in 1131 and at Westminster in 1132. Basset witnessed no royal documents after 1133 when King Henry left England for Normandy for the final time.

After King Henry's death in 1135, Basset was not employed as a royal official, either as a justice or as a sheriff. He appears once as a witness to a charter of King Stephen's in 1136, but the authenticity of this document has been questioned. He had built a castle in Normandy at Montreuil-au-Houlme, but Basset did not have possession of it in 1136, when it was held against Stephen's opponents by William de Montpincon.

== Lands ==
Basset's lands did not form a compact estate, as they were spread over 11 counties. In 1135, Basset's lands totalled 184.25 carucates of land, and were later considered 15 knight's fees. In Leicestershire, Basset held most of the lands held by Robert de Buci at the time of the Domesday Survey of 1086. The lands were held by Basset of the king by right of his wife, but how the lands had passed into her family is unclear. In addition, Basset held land in Leicestershire from both King David I of Scotland and from Robert de Beaumont, the Earl of Leicester.

In 1125, Basset and his wife founded an Augustinian Order priory at Launde in Leicestershire. This priory, Launde Priory, was endowed with the village of Loddington in Leicestershire and a number of churches in that county and others.

== Family and death ==
Basset married Matilda, the daughter and eventual heiress of Geoffrey Ridel (d. 1120), sometime between 1120 and 1123. Matilda had a brother, Robert, who was mentioned in her marriage settlement. By the terms of the settlement, Robert Ridel was placed under the guardianship of Richard Basset until he was knighted and married to Basset's niece. The marriage settlement describes Matilda's dowry as being worth four knight's fees. Basset also received the right to arrange marriages for Matilda's sisters. Robert's lands were to come to Basset if Robert had no children. Not long after the settlement was written, Basset was in possession of the lands that should have been Robert's.

Basset witnessed a royal charter in 1135 but was dead by 1144 when his lands were granted by the Empress Matilda and her son Henry to Richard's son Geoffrey Ridel. His other sons were Ralph Basset, who held lands near Drayton, and William Basset, who held lands near Sapcote. William became a royal justice and sheriff like his father. Richard also had two daughters: Sibil, who married Robert de Cauz, and Matilda, who married John de Stuteville. Ralph inherited the ancestral lands in Normandy. The Norman chronicler Orderic Vitalis wrote that Basset built a tower on his ancestral lands of Montreuil in Normandy purely to demonstrate his status and wealth.
