= Ralph Basset =

12th-century Anglo-Norman royal official and sheriff

Royal justice
- In office 1110–1127

Personal details
- Died: c. 1127 Northampton
- Spouse: A. de Buci de Brusse
- Children: Richard Basset; Nicholas; Ralph; Turstin

Ralph Basset (sometimes Bassett; died c. 1127) was a medieval English royal justice during the reign of King Henry I of England. He was a native of Normandy and may have come to Henry's notice while Henry held land in Normandy prior to becoming king. Basset is first mentioned in documents about 1102, and from then until his death around 1127, he was frequently employed as a royal justice. His son Richard Basset also became a royal judge.

== Origins ==
Basset was a native of Montreuil-au-Houlme near Domfront in Normandy, and possibly came to the notice of King Henry while Henry was count of Domfront during the reign of Henry's older brother King William II of England (1087–1100). Either Basset himself or an earlier person with the same name held lands of Robert d'Oilly that were recorded in Domesday Book as in Buckinghamshire and Hertfordshire. If the Ralph in Domesday was not the same as the judge, the Domesday Ralph may have been the judge's father. Other Bassets in the area were also recorded in Domesday, including a William and a Richard. It is not clear how or if they were related to Ralph. Ralph the judge held lands in Montreuil that in 1150 were considered to be worth two English manors. He held lands in Wallingford and Colston Basset. The lands in Wallingford were worth 16 and a third knight's fees.

== Royal service ==
The first secure mentions of Basset are in royal charters dating to around 1102, where he appears as a witness. He then appears as a judge in a royal dispute with the sheriff of Yorkshire. Basset is named as one of the commissioners of the Liber Winton, a survey of the landholdings in the city of Winchester which took place at some point between 1103 and 1115, probably close to 1110. From his Norman lands, Basset is recorded as donating lands to the Abbey of Saint-Evroul in 1113. In 1111, Basset took part in the Michaelmas session of the Exchequer, and he continued to take part in financial affairs and can be considered as an early Baron of the Exchequer.

Basset appears as a royal justice in 1116, serving in Huntingdonshire. Basset was noted in the Anglo-Saxon Chronicle entry for 1124 as hanging 44 thieves, during an eyre in Leicestershire. Possibly, Basset's severity was part of an attempt to overawe the under-tenants of the Beaumont twins, one of whom, Waleran, Count of Melun, rebelled during 1124. During the period 1110–1127, Basset was one of the leading royal justices and was described by the medieval chronicler Henry of Huntingdon as one of the "justices of all England". Huntingdon's implication is that Basset's scope was over all of England, not limited to his own locality.

Basset is recorded in the Pipe Roll of 1130 as having performed judicial functions in 11 different shires, even though by this point he was already dead. Basset also served on the informal vice-regency council that assisted Henry's wife and son when the king was out of England. Basset seems to have spent most of his judicial and royal career in England, as he only is a witness on one royal document that was drawn up in Normandy. According to the compiler of the Basset family charters, William Reedy, "there is more evidence for Ralph's service for the king in England" than for any other royal servant who was not clergy. His most active period of royal service was from 1120 to 1130. An older view from historians was that Basset was Chief Justiciar of England, which is not held by historians currently, nor can the idea that Basset was the head of justices or just the head of the itinerant justices during Henry's reign be determined with any confidence either. It is clear that Basset was employed by the king extensively, and probably that the nobleman worked mostly full-time for the king.

Basset's rewards for his royal service included a number of manors. Basset was granted the manor of Mixbury by the king after the family that held it at the time of Domesday Book died out and it escheated to the king. (Note: It had been held by Roger d'Ivry in 1086, but by the early 12th century it was back in the royal demesne.) Other lands held by Basset were probably royal rewards also. One was Quiddenham, which had been held in 1086 by the crown. Another was Stoney Stanton, originally held in 1086 by Robert Despenser.

== Death and legacy ==
Basset probably died in 1127 and was certainly dead by 1130. He is said to have taken ill at Northampton, and to have been clothed in a monk's habit while on his deathbed. He was buried in the chapterhouse at Abingdon Abbey, which he left a bequest to. A copy of a charter from Archbishop Theobald of Bec, recorded in a cartulary, records most of Basset's manors. While most of the estates seem to have been held by Basset as a sub-tenant, four of the estates appear to have been held as a tenant-in-chief. These estates were not very valuable, and Basset can not be considered a baron, although his son Richard managed through marriage to become a member of the barons. He held lands in nine counties, perhaps centred in Berkshire. (Note: The nine counties were Bedford, Berkshire, Buckingham, Gloucester, Hertford, Leicester, Norfolk, Nottingham, and Oxford.)

Basset was the founding member of a dynasty of royal servants who continued to serve the kings of England until around 1250. The medieval writer and chronicler Orderic Vitalis described Basset as one of the new men of King Henry, who "raised them, so to say, from the dust". Among Basset's four sons were Richard Basset, and Nicholas. Another son was Ralph who became a cleric. A fourth son was Turstin, who held land around Wallingford. Basset also had daughters, but their names are not known. Only the first initial of his wife's name is known, which was A. Richard received the Norman estates, but not most of the English lands, perhaps because he married an heiress.
