= Billy Bassett (Welsh footballer) =

Welsh footballer

Personal information
- Full name: William Edward George Bassett
- Date of birth: 8 June 1912
- Place of birth: Brithdir, Caerphilly, Wales
- Date of death: 1977 (aged 64–65)
- Place of death: Pwllheli, Caernarvonshire, Wales
- Height: 6 ft 1/2 in (1.84 m)
- Position: Defender

Senior career*
Years	Team	Apps	(Gls)
?–1933	Aberaman Athletic		
1933–1934	Wolverhampton Wanderers	0	(0)
1934–1938	Cardiff City	154	(2)
1938–1949	Crystal Palace	70	(0)
1949–?	Porthmadog		
- * Club domestic league appearances and goals

William Edward George Bassett (8 June 1912 – 1977) was a Welsh professional footballer. During his career, he made over 200 appearances in the Football League in spells with Cardiff City and Crystal Palace.

== Career ==
Bassett began his career at Aberaman Athletic before moving on to Wolverhampton Wanderers in 1933. He only spent a single season at Wolves, without making a first-team appearance, before returning to Wales and signing for manager Ben Watts-Jones at Cardiff City. He made his debut on the opening day of the 1934–35 season during a 2–1 victory over Charlton Athletic and was a virtual ever-present in his four years, scoring two goals for the Bluebirds, against Bournemouth & Boscombe Athletic and Bristol City.

He joined Crystal Palace in 1938 but the outbreak of World War II interrupted his spell at the London side and he served in the Welsh Guards during the hostilities. He finished his league career after three years with the club and took over as player-manager of Porthmadog.
