= Jean-Marie Basset =

French chemist (born 1943)

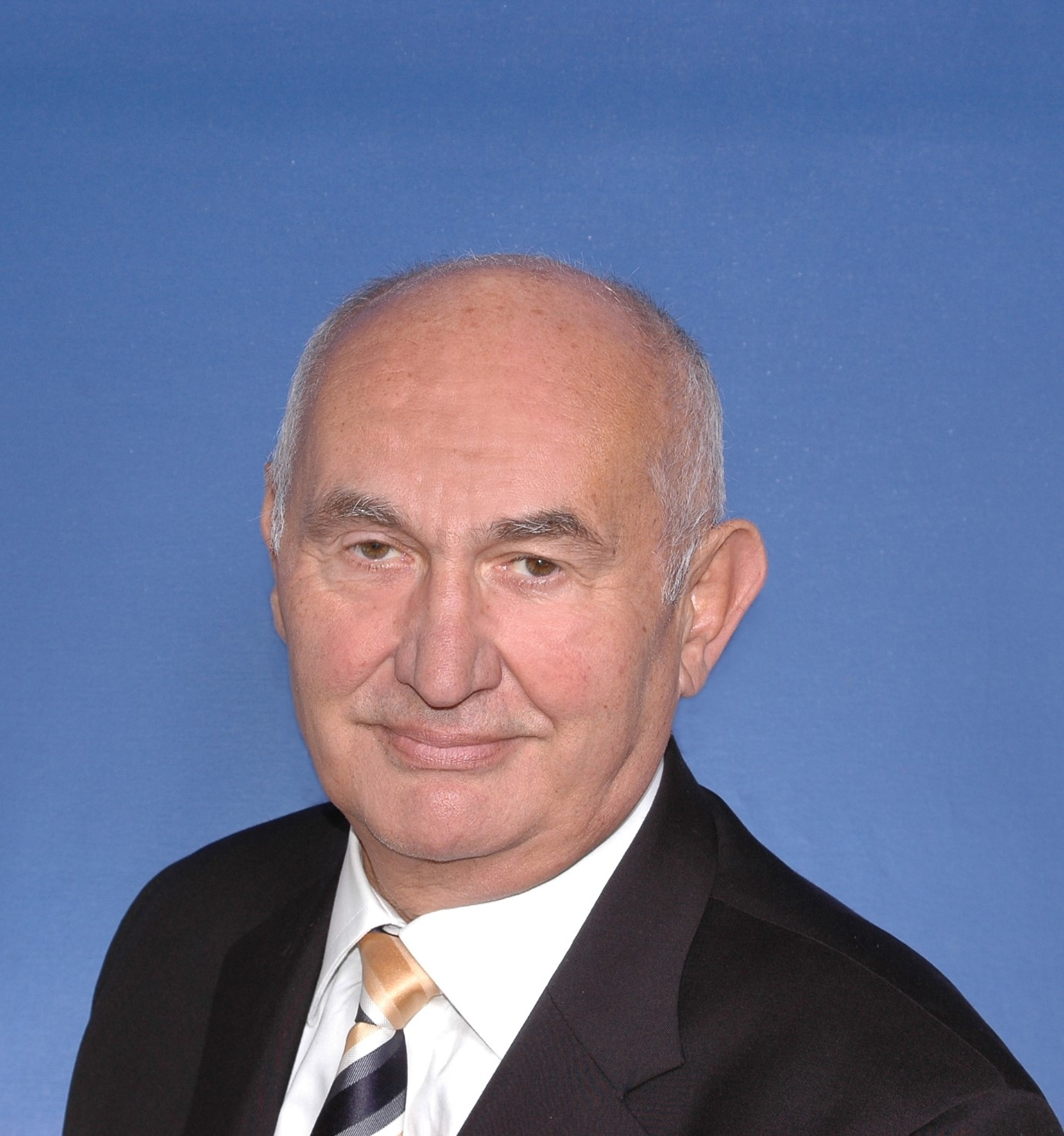
- Jean-Marie Basset, 2018
- Born: 9 June 1943 (age 83); Lyon, France
- Education: CPE Lyon & KAUST
- Known for: Surface organometallic chemistry (SOMC)
- Scientific career
- Fields: Catalysis chemistry

Jean-Marie Basset (born 9 June 1943) is a French chemist, and is currently the director of KAUST catalysis research center.

== Biography ==
Jean Marie Basset is an engineer from the École Supérieure de Chimie Industrielle de Lyon. He is doing a doctoral thesis under the supervision of Professor Marcel Prettre, a corresponding member of the institute. After a postdoctoral fellowship at the University of Toronto in Toronto and Imperial College in London (with Nobel Prize winner Prof. Wilkinson), he joined the CNRS Catalytic Institute, where he became deputy director. He was then a founding member, along with Jean Claude Charpentier, of the École de Chimie Physique et Électronique de Lyon (CPE Lyon), where he became scientific director. He created the Surface Organometallic Chemistry Laboratory and then the Catalysis and Process Chemistry Laboratory COMS UMR CNRS-CPE-UCB 52, of which he is the director. He then became a founding member and director of the Catalysis Centre at King Abdullah University of Science and technology in 2008. He was President of a European Laboratory of Excellence (NOE) IDECAT, which includes 44 catalyst laboratories in Europe. He has been a member of the board of numerous institutions such as AXELERA (competition pole, chemistry and environment), CPE, the Maison de la Chimie.

== Research ==
Jean Marie Basset's only scientific objective was to bring together two a priori very different disciplines; homogeneous catalysis on the one hand (governed by the laws of molecular chemistry) and heterogeneous catalysis on the other hand (more oriented towards surface science). Yet catalysis (whether heterogeneous or homogeneous) is a discipline corresponding to the transformation of molecules into other molecules and macromolecules. Therefore, the rules of molecular chemistry should apply to the rationalization, at least partial, of heterogeneous catalysis phenomena. In particular, any heterogeneous catalyst intermediate must involve an organometallic surface fragment.

Jean-Marie Basset has thus developed "surface organometallic chemistry" which consists in reacting organometallic complexes resulting from molecular chemistry with oxide or metal surfaces. A whole new discipline of chemistry has emerged, of which he is the pioneer. The first step was to develop the tools necessary for the identification and advanced characterization of these new types of catalysts. Then he used these tools to demonstrate the first molecular cluster catalysis reaction. Then he discovered the transformation of polyolefins (plastics) into diesel. Then the alkane metathesis reaction, the coupling of methane to ethane and hydrogen, the metathesis of cycloalkanes, the transformation of ethylene to propylene, the cutting of alkanes by methane, the hydro metathesis of olefins, the metathesis of imines, the metathetic oxidation of olefins. All these new reactions of catalysis may have been the result of a predictive approach to catalysis, which is his current research focus. The rationalization of heterogeneous catalysis by design allows it to meet an industrial demand that is increasingly concerned with energy and the environment. Jean-Marie Basset has filed more than 50 patents in Europe and the United States, and works with the largest chemical and petrochemical groups.

Jean-Marie Basset is the author or co-author of nearly 1,000 scientific publications.

== Honours and awards ==
- 2017: Honorary Professor, Central South Central University (CN)
- 2017: Honorary Professor, Fu Zhou University (CN)
- 2017: Member of the National Academy of Inventors (USA)
- 2015 : Honorary Professor, Nanjing University (CN)
- 2011: Member of the European Academy of Sciences and Arts (EU)
- 2008: Doctor Honoris Causa, University of Xiamen (CN)
- 2008: Doctor Honoris Causa Technical University of Munich (DE)
- 2006: Augustine Award of the ORCS (USA)
- 2005: Distinguished Achievements Award of IMPI (USA)
- 2003: Chevalier in the Ordre national du Mérite (FR)
- 2002: Visiting Professor at Hokkaido University (JAP)
- 2002: Member of the French Academy of Sciences (FR)
- 2001: Member of the Académie des Technologies (FR)
- 1999: Speaker "August-Wilhem-Von-Hofman-Vorselung" (DE)
- 1998: "Prix de l'Institut Français du Pétrole", Académie des Sciences (FR)
- 1998: "SEABORG Lecturer in Inorganic Chemistry (University of Berkeley) (USA)
- 1997: "Procope" prize for Franco-German collaboration (FR/DE)
- 1997: Grand Prize) "Prix Süe 1997" of the French Chemical Society (FR)
- 1993: Membre correspondent of the French Academy of Sciences (FR)
- 1992: "Grammaticakis Neuman" Prize from the French Academy of Sciences (FR)
- 1991: "Max Planck" Award, joint with Wolfgang A. Herrmann (Technical University of Munich, Germany)
- 1987: "Japan Society for the Promotion of Sciences" (JAP)
- 1987: "Alexander Von Humboldt" Award (DE)
- 1984: Speaker "Pacific Coast Lecturer West Coast" (USA)
