= Gometz-le-Châtel =

Commune in Île-de-France, France

- Commune
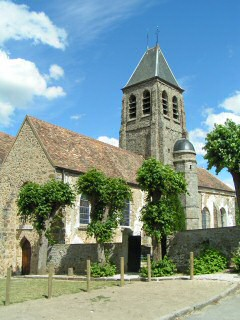
- The church of Saint-Clair, in Gometz-le-Châtel

- Coat of arms
- Location of Gometz-le-Châtel
- Location within France Location within Île-de-France (region)
- Coordinates: 48°40′41″N 2°08′16″E
- Country: France
- Region: Île-de-France
- Department: Essonne
- Arrondissement: Palaiseau
- Canton: Les Ulis
- Intercommunality: CA Paris-Saclay

Government
  - Mayor (2020–2026): Lucie Sellem
- Area^{1}: 5.06 km^{2} (1.95 sq mi)
- Highest elevation: 169 m (554 ft)
- Lowest elevation: 83 m (272 ft)
- Population (2023): 2,630
  - Density: 520/km^{2} (1,350/sq mi)
- Time zone: UTC+01:00 (CET)
  - Summer (DST): UTC+02:00 (CEST)
- INSEE/Postal code: 91275 /91940
- ^{1} French Land Register data, which excludes lakes, ponds, glaciers > 1 km^{2} (0.386 sq mi or 247 acres) and river estuaries.

Gometz-le-Châtel (French pronunciation: [ɡɔmɛs lə ʃɑtɛl]) is a commune in the Essonne department of France. It is a southern suburb of Paris, 25 km from the center of Paris.

== Geography ==
This village is near Les Ulis, Bures-sur-Yvette, Gif-sur-Yvette and Gometz-la-Ville, along the old road from Paris to Chartres, crossing the Hurepoix.

=== Climate ===
Gometz-le-Châtel has an oceanic climate (Köppen climate classification Cfb). The average annual temperature in Gometz-le-Châtel is 11.3 °C (52.3 °F). The average annual rainfall is 734.7 mm (28.93 in) with December as the wettest month. The temperatures are highest on average in July, at around 19.3 °C (66.7 °F), and lowest in January, at around 4.1 °C (39.4 °F). The highest temperature ever recorded in Gometz-le-Châtel was 42.8 °C (109.0 °F) on 25 July 2019; the coldest temperature ever recorded was −18.2 °C (−0.8 °F) on 16 January 1985.

Climate data for Gometz-le-Châtel (1991−2020 normals, extremes 1964−present)
Month	Jan	Feb	Mar	Apr	May	Jun	Jul	Aug	Sep	Oct	Nov	Dec	Year
Record high °C (°F)	15.3 (59.5)	21.1 (70.0)	25.8 (78.4)	28.1 (82.6)	31.2 (88.2)	37.8 (100.0)	42.8 (109.0)	40.0 (104.0)	35.1 (95.2)	29.3 (84.7)	21.0 (69.8)	16.8 (62.2)	42.8 (109.0)
Mean daily maximum °C (°F)	6.7 (44.1)	7.9 (46.2)	11.9 (53.4)	15.6 (60.1)	19.2 (66.6)	22.6 (72.7)	25.2 (77.4)	25.2 (77.4)	21.1 (70.0)	15.9 (60.6)	10.3 (50.5)	7.1 (44.8)	15.7 (60.3)
Daily mean °C (°F)	4.1 (39.4)	4.6 (40.3)	7.7 (45.9)	10.5 (50.9)	13.9 (57.0)	17.1 (62.8)	19.3 (66.7)	19.2 (66.6)	15.8 (60.4)	11.9 (53.4)	7.4 (45.3)	4.5 (40.1)	11.3 (52.3)
Mean daily minimum °C (°F)	1.5 (34.7)	1.3 (34.3)	3.4 (38.1)	5.3 (41.5)	8.6 (47.5)	11.6 (52.9)	13.4 (56.1)	13.2 (55.8)	10.4 (50.7)	7.9 (46.2)	4.4 (39.9)	2.0 (35.6)	6.9 (44.4)
Record low °C (°F)	−18.2 (−0.8)	−12.8 (9.0)	−9.9 (14.2)	−4.5 (23.9)	−1.0 (30.2)	0.8 (33.4)	4.2 (39.6)	4.1 (39.4)	0.7 (33.3)	−4.9 (23.2)	−9.0 (15.8)	−13.5 (7.7)	−18.2 (−0.8)
Average precipitation mm (inches)	59.9 (2.36)	53.7 (2.11)	53.5 (2.11)	51.9 (2.04)	73.1 (2.88)	60.7 (2.39)	60.8 (2.39)	59.9 (2.36)	52.6 (2.07)	64.9 (2.56)	67.1 (2.64)	76.6 (3.02)	734.7 (28.93)
Average precipitation days (≥ 1.0 mm)	12.0	10.5	10.0	9.2	9.9	8.9	7.6	7.8	8.1	10.8	11.6	13.0	119.4
Source: Météo-France

== History ==
- This is a very old village, known since 1068.
- A train line was built between Paris to Chartres via Gallardon, at the beginning of the 20th century, with a station at Gometz-le-Châtel. It was used from 1931 to 1939, but there is no traffic nowadays. Paris RER, B line, can be used to go there by train Bures-sur-Yvette (Paris RER) or La Hacquinière (Paris RER).
- An experimental Aérotrain was built, from Gometz-le-Châtel to Limours, for a trial, from 1966 to 1977, a creation of Jean Bertin (railway engineer). This experiment was replaced by the TGV, operating currently.

== Population ==
Historical population
Year	Pop.	±% p.a.
1968	978	—
1975	1,342	+4.62%
1982	1,407	+0.68%
1990	1,763	+2.86%
1999	1,847	+0.52%
2007	2,091	+1.56%
2012	2,618	+4.60%
2017	2,752	+1.00%
2023	2,630	−0.75%
Source: INSEE

Inhabitants of Gometz-le-Châtel are called Castelgometziens in French.

== Places to see ==
- Saint-Clair's Church built during the 10th Century.
- Viaduc des Fauvette
- La Fontaine Miraculeuse

== Personalities ==
- Charles Peguy (French author) lived here for a time.

== See also ==
- Communes of the Essonne department
