= Gometz-la-Ville =

Commune in Île-de-France, France

- Commune
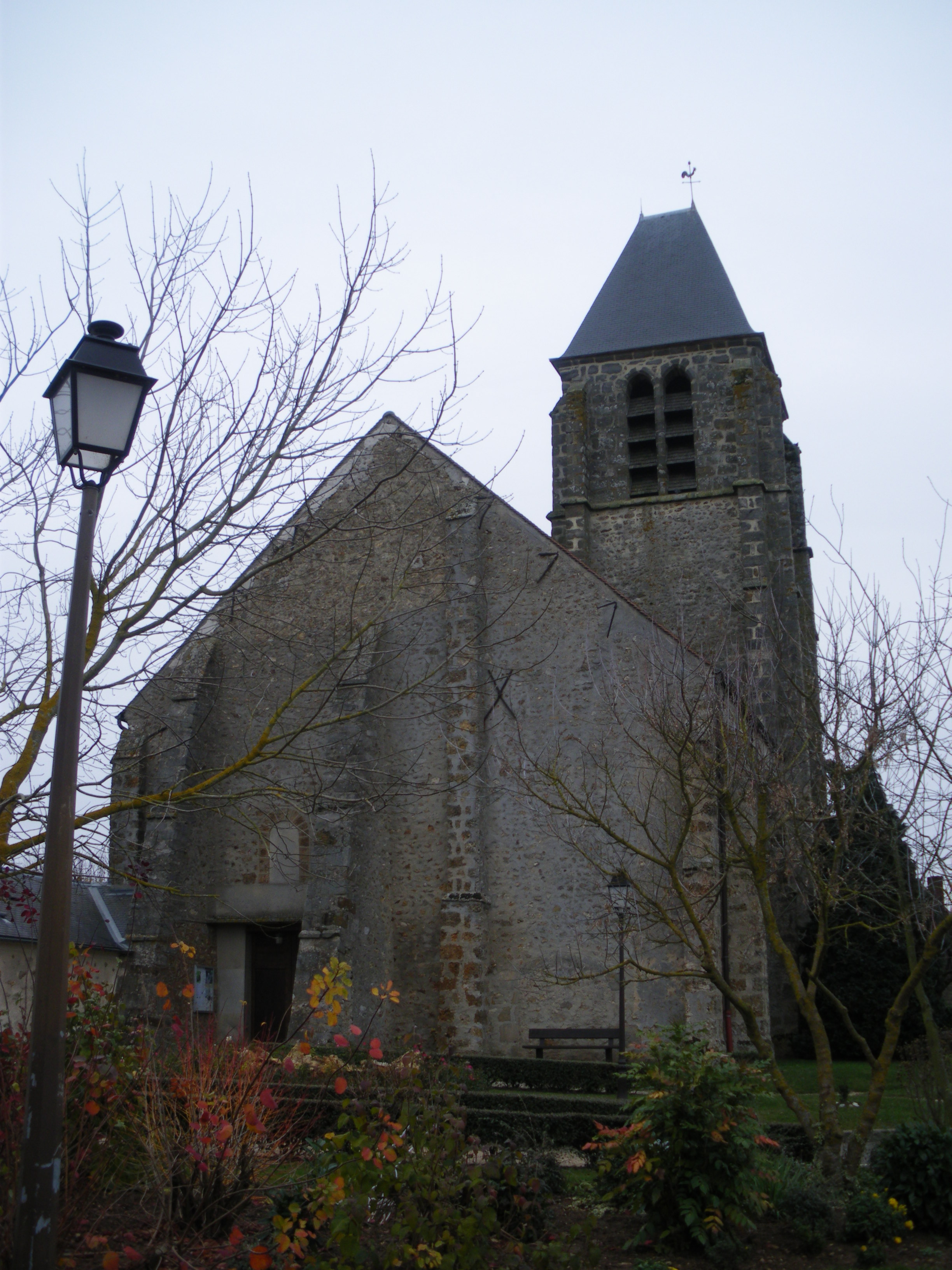
- The church of Saint-Germain-de-Paris, in Gometz-la-Ville

- Coat of arms
- Location of Gometz-la-Ville
- Location within France Location within Île-de-France (region)
- Coordinates: 48°40′18″N 2°07′30″E
- Country: France
- Region: Île-de-France
- Department: Essonne
- Arrondissement: Palaiseau
- Canton: Gif-sur-Yvette
- Intercommunality: Pays de Limours

Government
  - Mayor (2020–2026): Edwige Huot Marchand
- Area^{1}: 9.86 km^{2} (3.81 sq mi)
- Highest elevation: 176 m (577 ft)
- Lowest elevation: 92 m (302 ft)
- Population (2023): 1,536
  - Density: 156/km^{2} (403/sq mi)
- Time zone: UTC+01:00 (CET)
  - Summer (DST): UTC+02:00 (CEST)
- INSEE/Postal code: 91274 /91400
- ^{1} French Land Register data, which excludes lakes, ponds, glaciers > 1 km^{2} (0.386 sq mi or 247 acres) and river estuaries.

Gometz-la-Ville (French pronunciation: [ɡɔmɛs la vil]) is a French communes in the Essonne department in the southern suburbs of Paris (25 km) from the center of Paris. Inhabitants of Gometz-la-Ville are named Gometziens.

== Geography ==
The village is near Les Ulis, Limours, Gif-sur-Yvette and Gometz-le-Châtel, along the old road from Paris to Chartres, crossing the Hurepoix.

== History ==
- A train line was built from Paris to Chartres via Gallardon, at the beginning of the 20th century, with a station in the nearby town of Gometz-le-Châtel. It was used from 1931 to 1939, but there is no traffic nowadays. The nearest station on the Paris RER B line are Bures-sur-Yvette station and La Hacquinière station, which are accessed by bus.
- An experimental Aérotrain was built, from Gometz-le-Châtel to Rambouillet, for test, from 1966 to 1977, from a creation of Jean Bertin (train engineer). This project was stopped, for TGV's one, using right now.

== Places to see ==
- Saint-Germain's church, built during the 12th century.
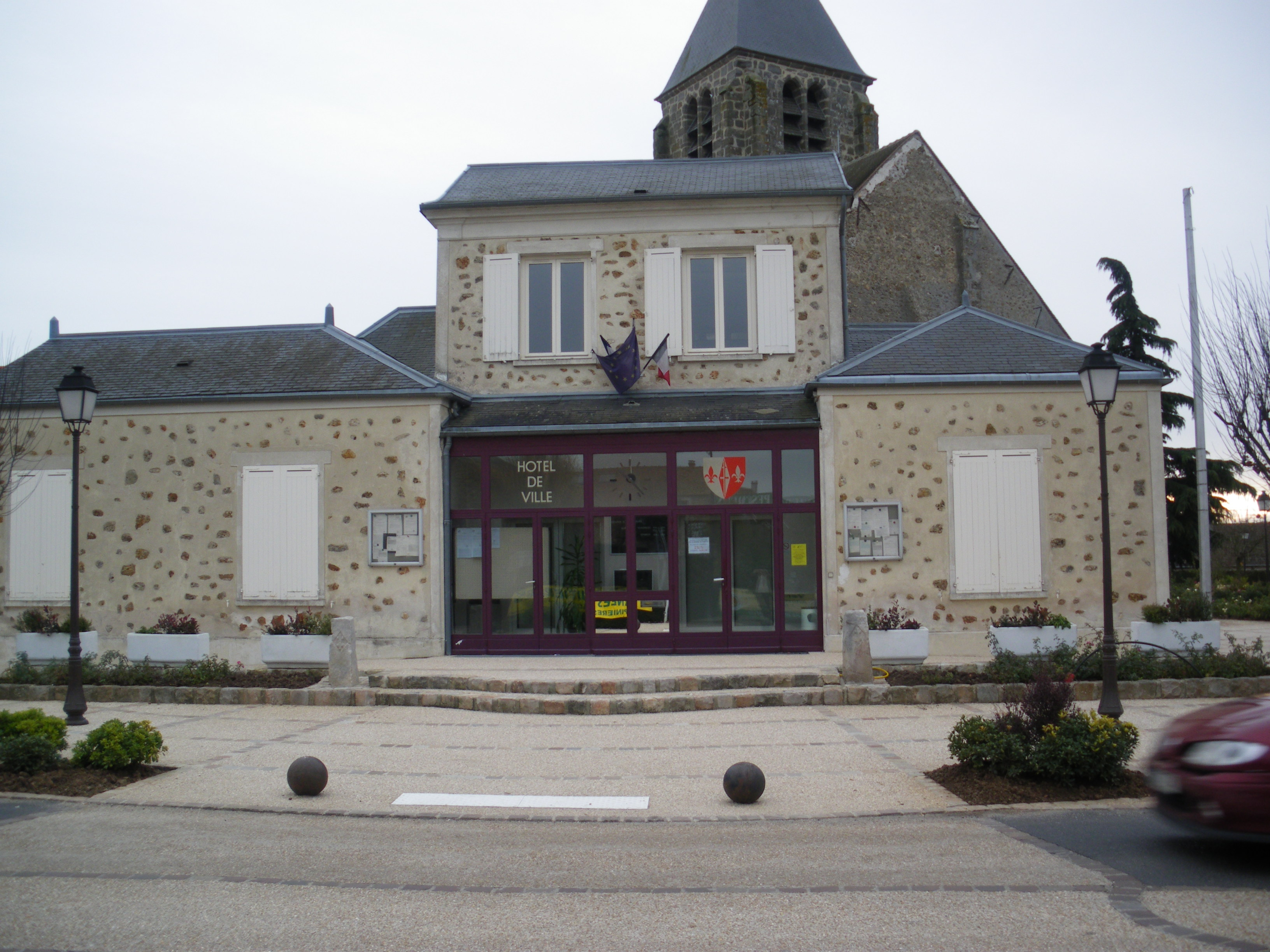
Gometz's Town Hall

== Economy ==
- Space Station of France Télécom R&D (old name CNET)

== See also ==
- Communes of the Essonne department
