= Orsay-Ville station =

Railway station in Orsay, France

Orsay-Ville
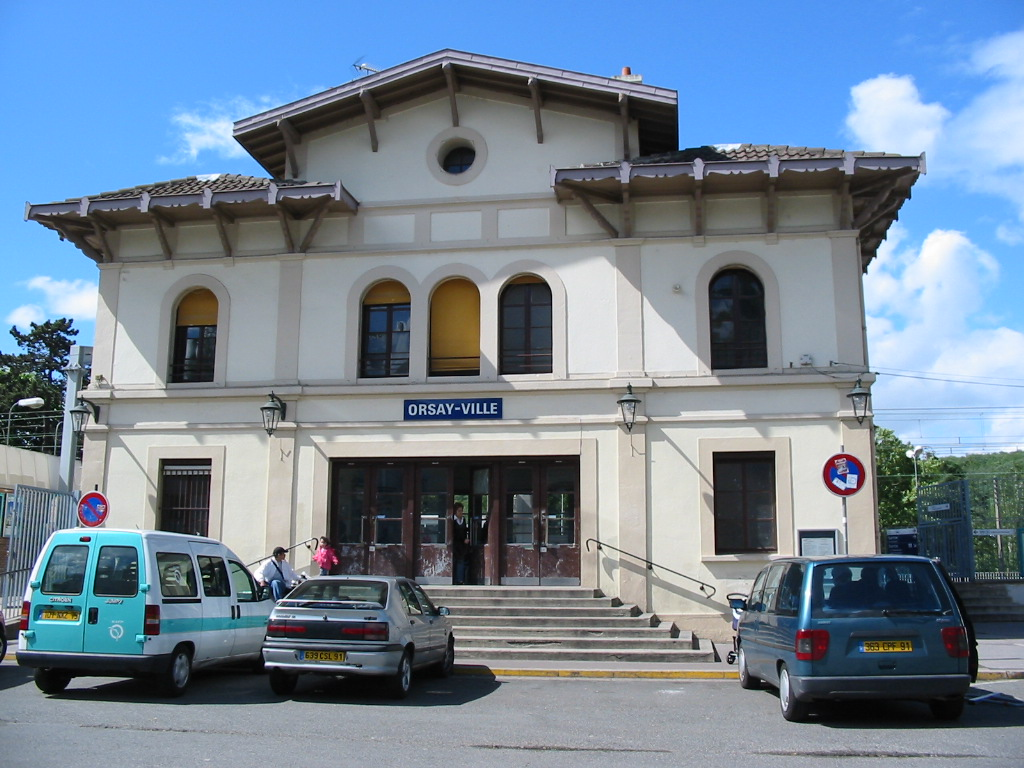
- Orsay-Ville station entrance

General information
- Location: Orsay; France
- Coordinates: 48°41′51″N 2°10′55″E
- Operator: RATP Group
- Line: Ligne de Sceaux
- Platforms: 1 island platform 1 side platform
- Tracks: 2

Construction
- Structure type: At-grade
- Accessible: Yes, by request to staff

Other information
- Station code: 87758847
- Fare zone: 5

Services
Preceding station	RER	Following station
Le Guichet towards Aéroport Charles de Gaulle 2 TGV or Mitry–Claye	RER B	Bures-sur-Yvette towards Saint-Rémy-lès-Chevreuse
Location

Orsay-Ville station (French: Gare d'Orsay-Ville) is an RER B station in the town of Orsay, near Paris, in France. This is one of the stations for University of Paris-Sud.

== Bus lines from this station ==
Many bus lines stop at this station, from many cities around:

- Les Ulis
- Limours
- Bures-sur-Yvette
- Saclay
