= Société d'Étude et de Développement des Aéroglisseurs Marins =

1965–1982 French hovercraft manufacturer

- Founded: 1965; 61 years ago
- Founder: Jean Bertin
- Defunct: 1982; 44 years ago
- Headquarters: Pauillac, France
- Products: Hovercraft
- Parent: Bertin & Cie (1965); Chantiers Dubigeon-Normandie (1982)

The Société d'Étude et de Développement des Aéroglisseurs Marins (SEDAM) was a French-based hovercraft manufacturer which designed and produced multiple vehicles intended for both commercial and civil purposes.

== History ==
=== Foundation ===
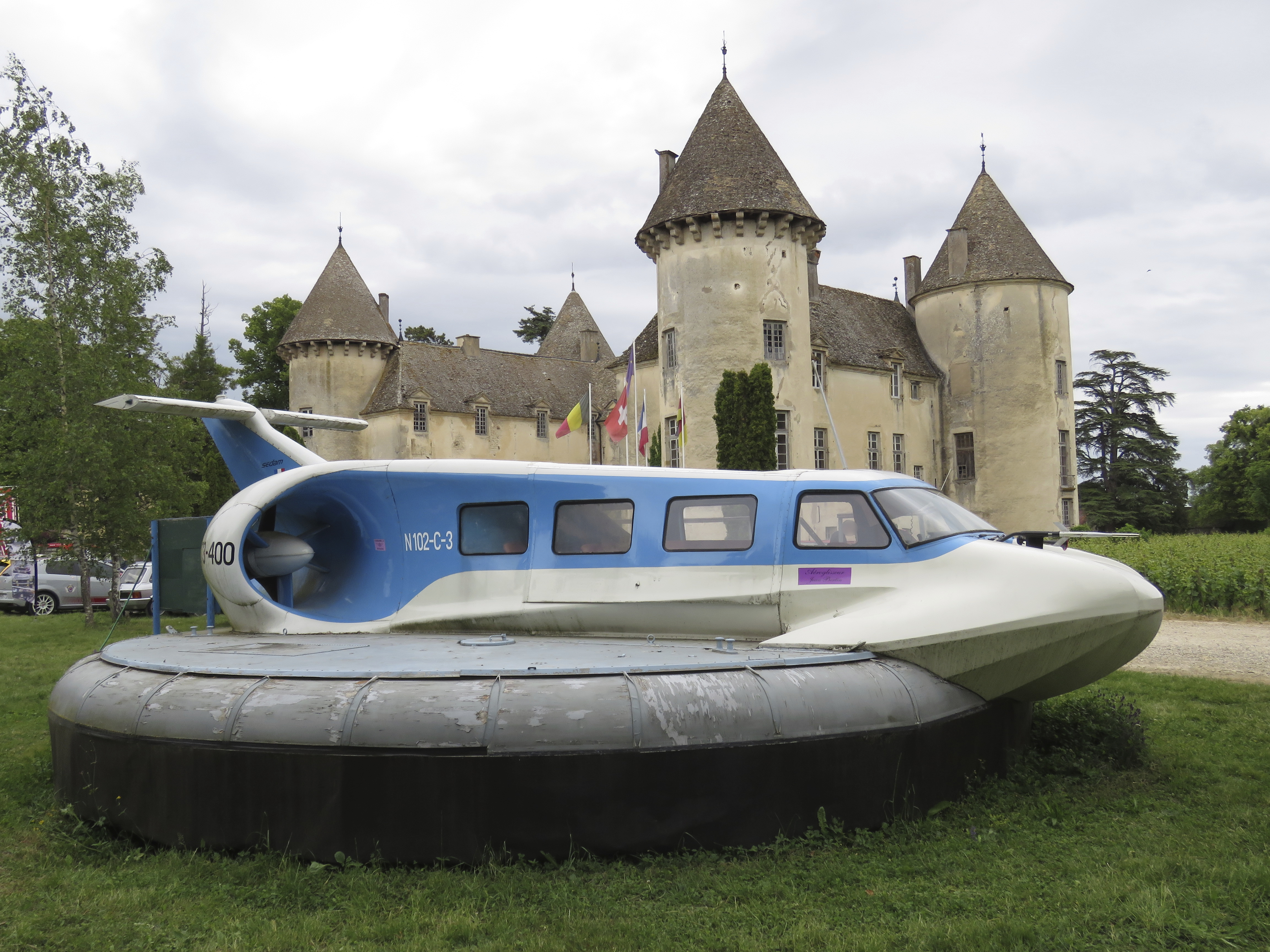
N.102 Naviplane at the Château de Savigny-lès-Beaune, 2019

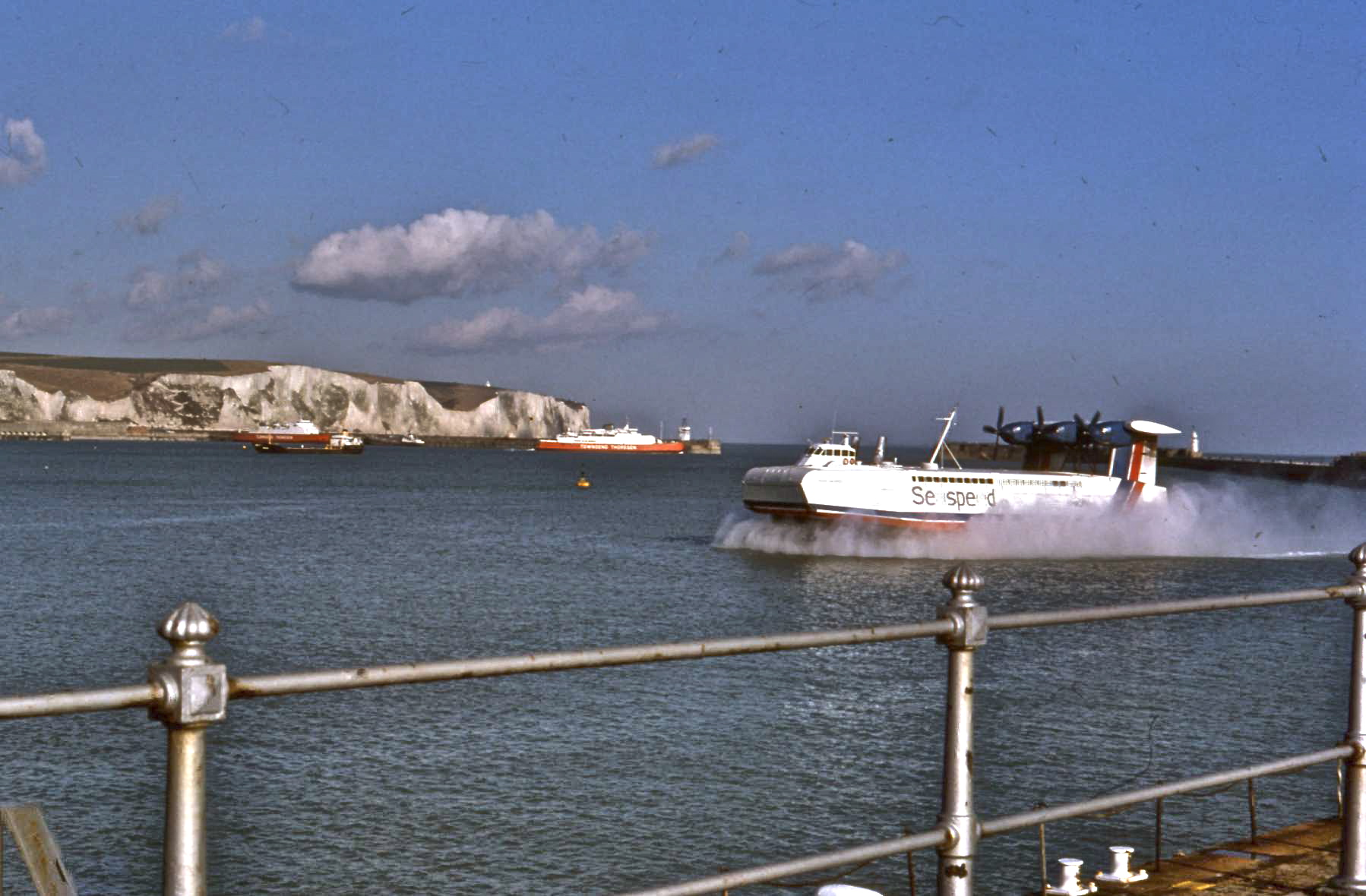
N.500 Naviplane by engineer Jean Bertin, arriving at Dover in 1980

The firm was founded in 1965 by inventor Jean Bertin with backing from the French government under Georges Pompidou, in an attempt to create a French rival to the British Hovercraft Corporation's SR.N4 Mountbatten Class hovercraft. The firm was initially a subsidiary of Bertin's company Bertin & Cie along with separate companies for Bertin's Aérotrain and Terraplane projects.

=== Production ===
The company produced several different craft, which they called Naviplanes including the N.101, N.102 and N.122 types.

The first French commercial hovercraft was the SEDAM N.300 Naviplane, which was first announced in 1966. The N.300 was first operational in the Mediterranean with Société Naviplane Côte d'Azur, with the technical and economical aspects of designing and operating the craft being presented by SEDAM President and Director General Abel Thomas and Bertin at the Second International Hovercraft Conference in Southampton in 1971.

The N.300 was seen by the company as prototype for a much larger craft, designed for operation across the English Channel or between France and Corsica in the Mediterranean Sea. This larger craft was originally proposed to carry 500 passengers and evolved in the N.500 Naviplane project.

The N.500 project started in 1973 with the commencement of detailed research which involved scale models to test all aspects of the crafts operation. Two orders had been made by SNCF and the first of these craft, Côte d'Argent was launched in November 1976, with the second, Ingénieur Jean Bertin being constructed almost simultaneously. After skirt damage to Côte d'Argent during the first test flight on 19 April 1977, she was sent for repair at SEDAM's Pauillac factory after an unsatisfactory skirt repair by the skirt manufacturer, in advance of her inauguration during a private visit on 9 May 1977 by Queen Elizabeth II, the Prince of Wales and Baron Philippe de Rothschild. During this repair work damage to a lightbulb by an operative ignited the adhesive being used to repair the skirt and the resulting fire completely destroyed her. Ingénieur Jean Bertin was finally delivered to Seaspeed in November 1977 although its entry into service was beset by technical problems which included an inability to mount the Dover Hoverport pad in anything other than calm weather.

Despite this, the craft managed a record crossing performance between Dover and Calais 22 minutes and 15 seconds (Note: This record is now held by The Princess Anne after a 22 minute run on 14 September 1995) and there was interest from Hoverlloyd and from as far away as Canada. Ultimately this would not transpire into further orders and a temporary withdrawal in September 1981 of Ingénieur Jean Bertin would see it remain out of service until 1983 to receive extensive modifications at a cost of £500,000 in efforts to improve reliability for new operators Hoverspeed. Ultimately the modifications failed to improve reliability and the craft was returned, its failure sealing the fate of the craft itself, which was broken up at the Boulogne Hoverport in 1985.

=== Closure ===
The modifications to Ingénieur Jean Bertin and failure to secure further orders saw the collapse of SEDAM, by now owned by Chantiers Dubigeon-Normandie, in 1982 After closure, the factory site was re-developed for non-aviation usage.

== Craft ==
- N.101 Naviplane
- N.102 Naviplane
- N.122 Naviplane
- N.300 Naviplane
- N.500 Naviplane
