= N500 Naviplane =

Commercial transport hovercraft

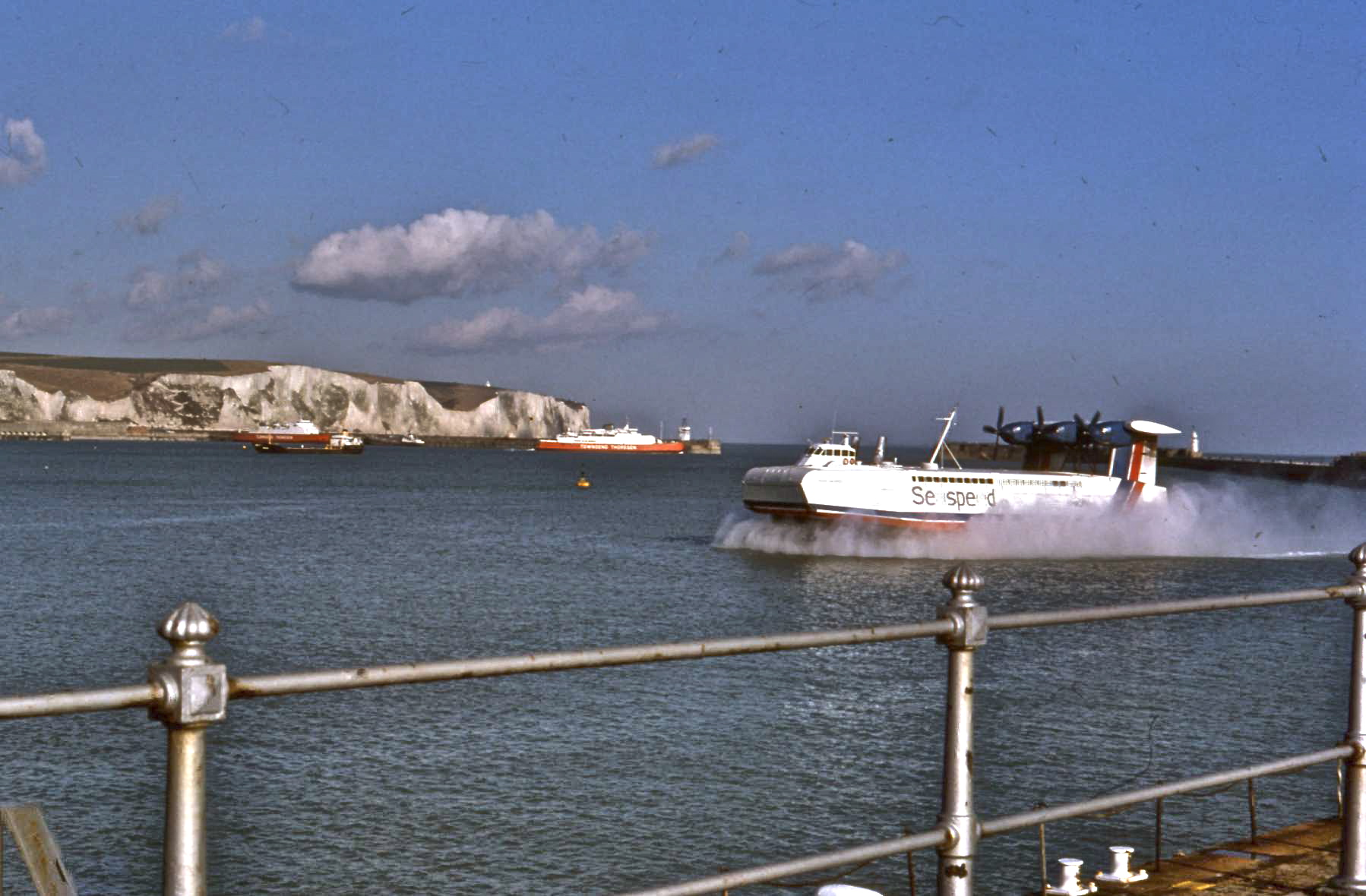
- The N500 arriving at Dover in 1980

Class overview
- Name: N.500 Naviplane
- Builders: SEDAM/SNCF
- Operators: Seaspeed, Hoverspeed
- Preceded by: N.300 Naviplane
- Built: –1977
- In service: 1977–1985
- Completed: 2
- Scrapped: 2

General characteristics
- Type: Hovercraft
- Length: 50 m (160 ft)
- Beam: 23 m (75 ft)
- Height: 17 m (55 ft 9 in) hovering
- Installed power: 5 x 2,535 kW (3,400 hp)
- Propulsion: 5 × Avco-Lycoming TF40 gas turbines
- Capacity: 385 passengers; 45 cars
- Crew: 15

The N500 Naviplane was a French hovercraft built by Société d'Etude et de Développement des Aéroglisseurs Marins (SEDAM) in Pauillac, Gironde for the cross English Channel route. Intended to have a large passenger and crew capacity, as prototypes they were for a short while the largest hovercraft. Only two were built. The first was destroyed by a fire before entering service, the second proved unreliable and was broken up in 1985 at the end of its service.

== History ==
N500-01 - Côte d'Argent registered LV 365.832 port of Le Verdon, on the Gironde estuary.First flight on 19 April 1977 on the Gironde, demonstrating a speed of 40-45 knots (74–83 km/h). She was destroyed by a fire at her construction site on 3 May 1977.

N500-02 - Ingénieur Jean Bertin (Note: Named after Jean Bertin, developer of the Aérotrain) registered BL 341.931 at port of Boulogne-Sur-Mer was built for Seaspeed by SNCF in 1977. It showed poor engine and hydraulic system reliability/ It had difficulty climbing the ramp to the Dover hoverpad during bad weather.

Transferred to Hoverspeed in 1983 after a number of modifications but was returned to SNCF later that year after Hoverspeed decided she was not suitable for their services due to poor reliability. Broken up in 1985 at the Boulogne Hoverport.

The N500 was one of the world's largest hovercraft; it could transport 385 passengers plus 45 cars. It was also one of the fastest and reached a speed record for a travel from Boulogne to Dover at an average speed of 74 knots (137 km/h).

The mass of the N500 was 260 tons, it was 50 m long and 23 m wide.

== Crew ==
1 pilot. 1 co-pilot. Seated side by side in the cockpit. 1 radar-navigator seated at the rear part of the cockpit.

6 to 8 stewardess.

6 stower-men for the cars.

== Flight control ==
Flight yokes controlled the horizontal tail wing (elevator), propeller pitch and the thrust power of the 3 propulsion gas turbines

Rudder pedals controlled the two aerial rudders.

Two thrust levers controlled power of the two lifting gas turbines.

Obturation flaps system between the air cushion chamber and the skirts provided additional longitudinal and lateral control.

Later modifications (1983) included:

- A third rudder on the middle engine pylon.
- Four air vent system providing additional lateral control at low speed.

== Specifications (N500) ==
Data from

General characteristics

- Crew: 15 to 17 (flight crew and cabin crew)
- Capacity: 385 passengers
  45 cars
  86.364 t (85 long tons) payload
- Length: 50 m (164 ft 1 in)
- Width: 23 m (75 ft 6 in)
- Height: 17 m (55 ft 9 in) hovering
- Empty weight: 118,250 kg (260,697 lb)
- Fuel capacity: 23,380 L (5,143 imp gal)
- Oil capacity: 500 L (110 imp gal)
- Powerplant: 5 × Avco-Lycoming TF-40 turboshaft, 2,386 kW (3,200 hp) each (continuous) 2,535 kW (3,399 hp) (burst)
- Max continuous RPM: 14,500
- Fuel consumption: 247 Imp gal/engine/hour, fuel type: Kerosene JP4/TR4.
- Propellers: 4-bladed Hawker Siddeley and Ratier-Figeac variable pitch with reverse, 6.40 m (21 ft 0 in) diameter
- Propeller speed: 640 rpm

Performance

- Maximum speed: 139 km/h (86 mph, 75 kn)
- Cruise speed: 130 km/h (81 mph, 70 kn)
- Never exceed speed: 144 km/h (90 mph, 78 kn)
- Ferry range: 400 km (250 mi, 220 nmi)
- Endurance: 5 hours
- Operational Limits (Sea state): 1 - 1.5 m
- Operational Limits (Wind): 6 (Beaufort Scale)

Avionics
2 marine Decca radars (band S, 2-4 GHz, a 7 cm and 10 cm wavelength), one slave radar for the pilot, two VHF radio.

== See also ==
- Aérotrain
- SR.N4 (Mountbatten-class) hovercraft
- Naviplane N300
