= Valeria Pettorino =

Italian CDI researcher and physicist

Valeria Pettorino is an Italian physicist working in cosmology, astrophysics and data analysis. She is a CDI Researcher at CosmoStat, CEA Saclay, and she is part of Planck and Euclid ESA/NASA international space missions.

Her work is related to the use of data from ground and space missions to test theoretical models that describe the evolution and content of the Universe. Her work aims to describe the nature of dark matter and dark energy.

== Career ==
Pettorino studied physics as an undergraduate and obtained her PhD from the University of Naples in 2005, with a dissertation on "Dark energy in generalized theories of gravity". In 2007 she joined the Euclid space mission and became an Alexander von Humboldt Fellow at the University of Heidelberg. In 2009 she joined the Planck space mission and became Associate Research Fellow at Columbia University. She completed her PostDoc at SISSA in Trieste.

She works as astrophysicist and research engineer at CEA Paris-Saclay. Pettorino helped complete the final analysis of data from the European Space Agency’s Planck space telescope, which mapped the early universe with unprecedented precision.

Pettorino is also on the leadership team for the Worldwide Mentorship Program for Women in Physics. She also helped organize the annual EuroPython conference for users of the Python programming language.

== Personal ==
Pettorino's uncle was physicist Roberto Pettorino (1946-2013), who worked in string theory. As a side project, Pettorino took part into a creative writing group project, where she translated the opening lines of Dante’s Divine Comedy into a geometry problem.

== Selected publications ==
- Pettorino, Valeria, La quete de l'origine de l'acceleration cosmique. The Conversation (2019)
- with Austin Peel, Florian Lalande, Jean-Luc Starck, Julian Merten, Carlo Giocoli, Massimo Meneghetti, Marco Baldi: Distinguishing standard and modified gravity cosmologies with machine learning (2018)
- with Julian Merten, Carlo Giocoli, Marco Baldi, Massimo Meneghetti, Austin Peel, Florian Lalande, Jean-Luc Starck: On the dissection of degenerate cosmologies with machine learning (2018)
- with Austin Peel, Valeria Pettorino, Carlo Giocoli, Jean-Luc Starck, Marco Baldi: Breaking degeneracies in modified gravity with higher (than 2nd) order weak-lensing statistics (2018)
- with Santiago Casas, Martin Kunz, Matteo Martinelli: Linear and non-linear Modified Gravity forecasts with future surveys (2017)
