= N.300 Naviplane =

French 30-ton multipurpose ACV

Class overview
- Name: N.300 Naviplane
- Builders: SEDAM
- Operators: Société Naviplane (ferry service), Department de la Gironde (ferry service), French Navy (test evaluation)
- Preceded by: Naviplane N102
- Succeeded by: N500 Naviplane
- Built: 1967-1968
- In service: 1968-1972
- In commission: 1969-1972
- Planned: 2
- Building: 2
- Completed: 2
- Retired: 2
- Scrapped: 2

General characteristics
- Type: hovercraft
- Length: 23.3 metres (76 ft)
- Beam: 11.1 metres (36 ft)
- Height: 8 metres (26 ft)
- Decks: 1
- Ramps: 2
- Installed power: 2 x 1,217 kW (1,632 hp) - (based on IIIC3)
- Propulsion: 2 × Turbomeca Turmo III-D3 engine
- Speed: Maximum 65 knots (120 km/h) / Cruising 50 knots (92 km/h)
- Capacity: 110 (Baie des Anges modified in 1971 to carry 38 passengers and 4 cars)
- Crew: 2 (pilot and co-pilot),? (cabin crew)

The N.300 Naviplane was a French 30-ton multipurpose Air-cushion vehicle built by SEDAM (Société d'Etude et de Développement des Aéroglisseurs Marins) for the Naviplane series of Aéroglisseur (Hovercraft).

This was a series of multi-skirt hovercraft built by SEDAM using and developing the skirt designs by French engineer Jean Bertin. The series included the Naviplane N102, the Naviplane N300 and the N500 Naviplane, the N300 Naviplane was the first full-scale Naviplane designed for commercial use.

== Production ==
Two N.300 were built by SEDAM:

- Baie des Anges
- La Croisette

== Operators ==
- Société Naviplane (1969): both N300 used from Nice Airport with connections to Cannes, Saint-Tropez, Monaco and San-Remo.
- Gironde local government (1972): Baie des Anges used for ferry service between the Pauillac, Blaye and Lamarque with modifications to carry 38 passengers and 4 cars
- French Navy (1972): La Croisette was loaned to the Navy for evaluation in Toulon

== Fate ==
After 1973 both craft were stored by SEDAM in Pauillac until the firm ceased operations. Baie des Anges was sold to restaurateur in Maubuisson as floating restaurant, but plan never materialized. Returned to SEDAM, Baie des Anges and La Croisette were scrapped after 1983.

== Specifications (N.300) ==
- Overall length: 23.3 metres (76 ft)
- Overall Beam: 11.1 metres (36 ft)
- Overall Height: 8 metres (26 ft)
- Skirt height: 1.4 metres (4.6 ft)
- Cushion area: 170 square metres (1,800 sq ft)
- Deck area: 80 square metres (860 sq ft)
- Gross weight: 30 metric tonnes
- Payload: 11.5 metric tonnes
- Seating capacity: up to 110
- Fuel capacity: 2 tons
- Maximum speed (calm water): 65 knots (120 km/h)
- Cruising speed (calm water): 50 knots (92 km/h)

== Naviplane N300 MKII ==
The Naviplane N300 MKII was a proposed improved model of the N300. It was intended as a 120-seat, high-speed amphibious hoverferry for commercial use and a wide range of military roles.
