= Hydroplane =

Hydroplaning and hydroplane may refer to:

- Aquaplaning or hydroplaning, a loss of steering or braking due to water on the road
- Hydroplane (boat), a fast motor boat used in racing
  - Hydroplane racing, a sport involving racing hydroplanes on lakes and rivers
- Floatplane, a type of seaplane, with one or more slender pontoons
- Flying boat, a fixed-winged seaplane with a hull, allowing it to land on water
- Gallaudet Hydroplane, an early aircraft employing the use of wing-warping for roll control
- Hydrofoil, a boat with wing-like foils mounted on struts below the hull
- Planing (boat), a method by which the hull of a boat skims over the surface of the water
- Seaplane, a powered fixed-wing aircraft capable of taking off and landing on water
- Diving plane, a submarine control surface used to help control depth
- Hydroblading, a figure skating move sometimes referred to as hydroplaning

== See also ==
- Terraplane (disambiguation)
