= Sega Keita =

French-Senegalese footballer (born 1992)

Sega Keïta
Personal information
- Full name: Sega Keïta
- Date of birth: 3 March 1992 (age 34)
- Place of birth: Orsay, France
- Height: 1.77 m (5 ft 9 1/2 in)
- Position: Midfielder

Youth career
- 2000–2007: Les Ulis
- 2007–2010: Troyes

Senior career*
Years	Team	Apps	(Gls)
2009–2014	Troyes	32	(0)
2012–2013	→ Rouen (loan)	27	(1)
2015–2017	Tubize	62	(12)

International career
2009–2010	France U18	7	(2)
2010–2011	France U19	10	(4)
- * Club domestic league appearances and goals as of 1 October 2017

Sega Keïta (born 3 March 1992) is a French football player of Senegalese descent, who last played for French club Troyes. He was a French youth international and has played for the under-19 team. Keïta plays as a midfielder.

== Career ==
=== Early career ===
Keïta was born in the commune of Orsay in the southwestern suburbs of Paris, and began his football career at age eight, playing for local club CO Les Ulis, the same club that produced France national team's all-time leading goalscorer Thierry Henry.

Keïta joined the club and trained alongside fellow youth starlet Yaya Sanogo, before securing a move to second division outfit Troyes AC. Upon his arrival at the club during the 2007–08 season, he struggled due to ongoing groin injuries during his first year, which saw him only appear in eight games, scoring one goal in the Championnat National des 16 ans.

The following season, due to full health, his statistics improved. He appeared in 28 games, scoring 15 goals, and also made seven assists.

On 29 May 2009, with Troyes' relegation to third-tier Championnat National already confirmed, Keïta made his professional debut in a Ligue 2 match against Bastia, appearing as a substitute in the 59th minute for Claudio Beauvue. Troyes lost the match 2–1.

=== Professional career ===
On 15 August 2009, Keïta made his Championnat National debut in the 5–0 victory over Plabennec, appearing as a substitute.

He drew considerable interest from several clubs before signing his professional contract with Troyes. Notable clubs that sought his services included Premier League club Arsenal, Italian clubs Milan and Internazionale, and Ligue 1 club Marseille.

French football legend Zinedine Zidane personally recommended the player to Spanish giants Real Madrid. However, despite the interest, on 14 October 2009, Keïta agreed to a three-year professional contract with Troyes. Four days later, he earned his first start in a Coupe de France match against amateur club SA Sézanne. In the match, Keïta scored two goals. Five days later, he earned his first league start, playing 70 minutes in a 1–0 victory over Amiens. After Troyes were promoted to Ligue 1 from Ligue 2 in the 2011–12 season, in July he was loaned to the Championnat National side FC Rouen for the 2012–13 season.

== Career statistics ==
(Correct as of 30 June 2013)

Club	Season	League		Cup (Note: Includes Coupe de France, Coupe de la Ligue, Trophée des Champions)		Europe (Note: Includes UEFA Supercup)		Total	
Club	Season	Apps	Goals	Apps	Goals	Apps	Goals	Apps	Goals
Troyes	2008–09	1	0	0	0	0	0	1	0
Troyes	2009–10	14	0	2	2	0	0	16	2
Troyes	2010–11	8	0	3	0	0	0	11	0
Troyes	2011–12	7	0	2	0	0	0	9	0
Troyes	Total	30	0	7	2	0	0	37	2
Rouen (loan)	2012–13	27	1	2	0	0	0	29	1
Career total		57	1	9	2	0	0	66	3
