= Parc botanique de Launay =

Botanical garden in Île-de-France, France

Coordinates: 48.7009°N 2.1729°E

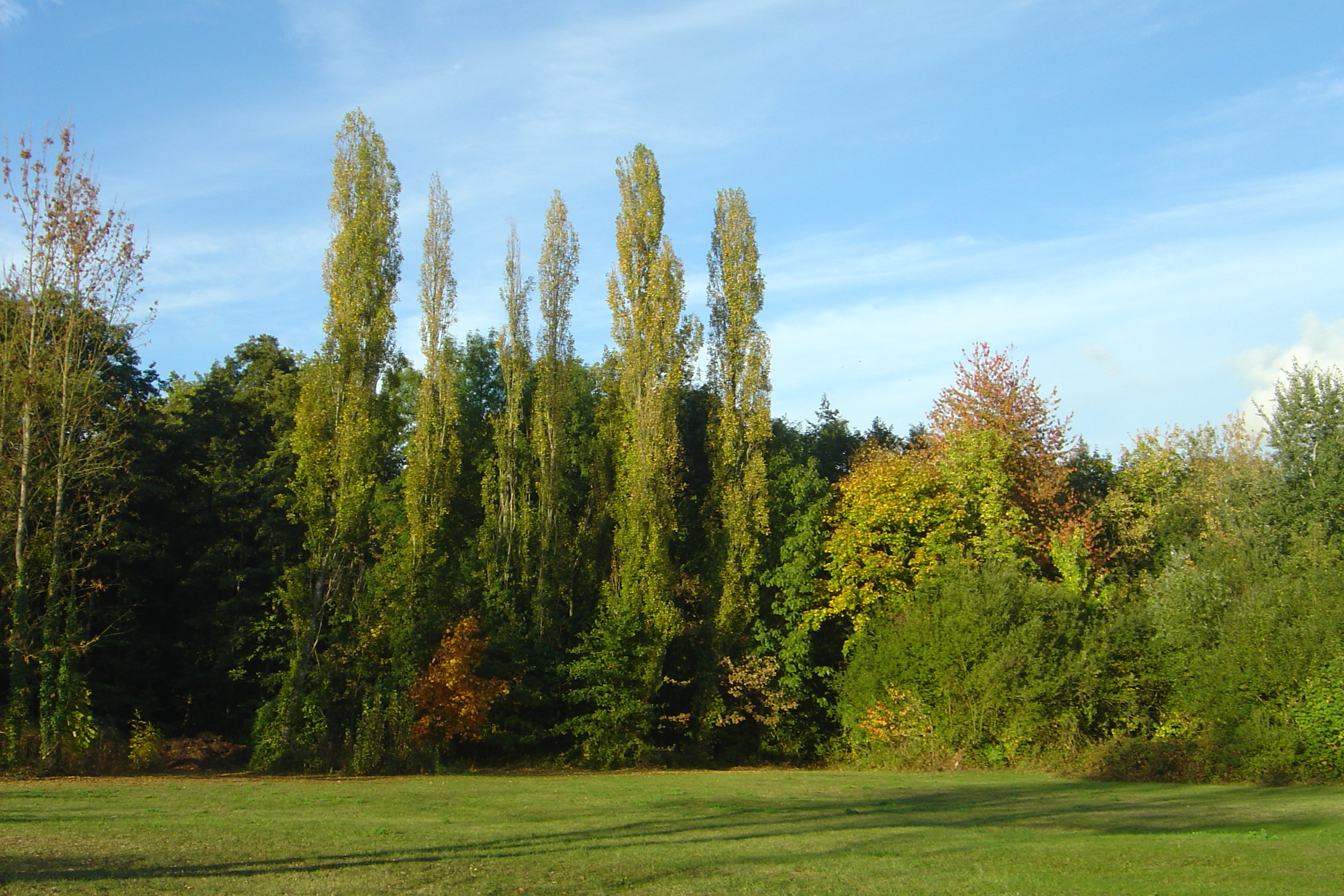
Parc botanique de Launay

The Parc botanique de Launay (90 hectares), sometimes known as the Parc botanique d'Orsay or the Parc de l'Université Paris XI, is a botanical garden located on the Université Paris-Sud XI campus at 3 rue Georges-Clemenceau, Orsay, Essonne, Île-de-France, France.

== See also ==
- List of botanical gardens in France
