= Orsay =

Commune in Île-de-France, France

- Commune
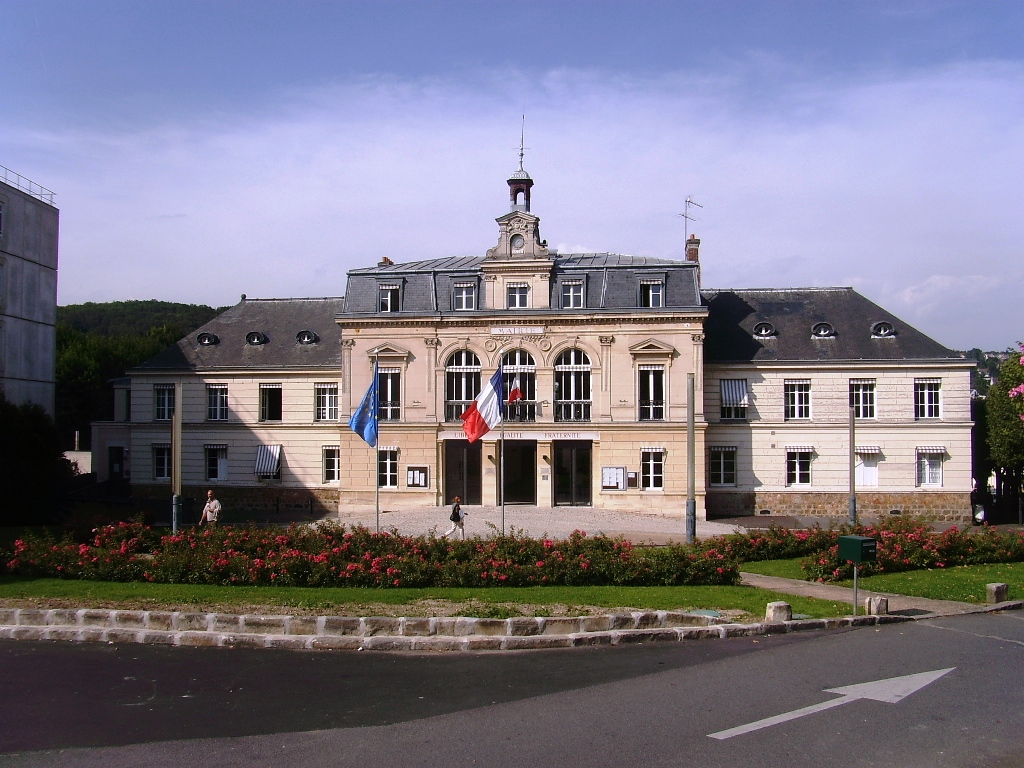
- Town hall

- Coat of arms

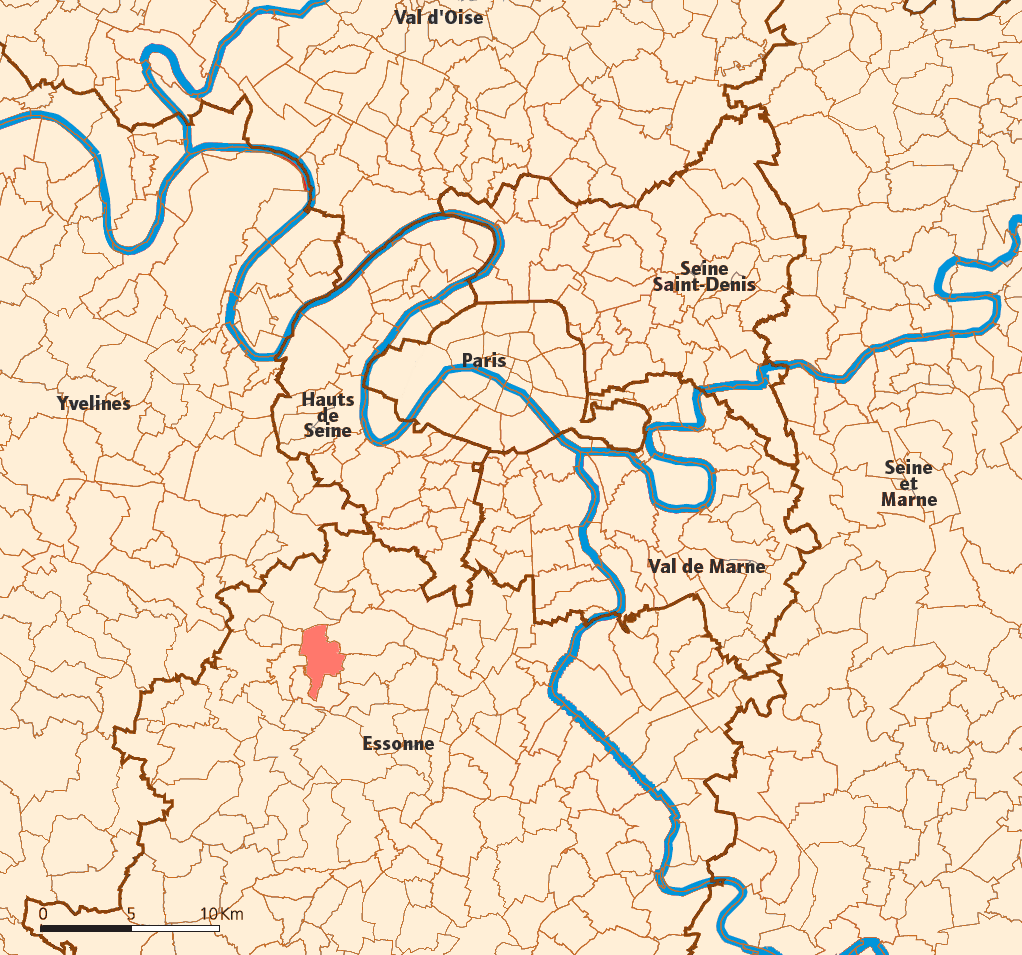
- Location (in red) within Paris inner and outer suburbs
- Location of Orsay
- Location within France Location within Île-de-France (region)
- Coordinates: 48°41′57″N 2°11′15″E
- Country: France
- Region: Île-de-France
- Department: Essonne
- Arrondissement: Palaiseau
- Canton: Palaiseau
- Intercommunality: CA Paris-Saclay

Government
  - Mayor (2024–2026): Rémi Darmon
- Area^{1}: 7.97 km^{2} (3.08 sq mi)
- Elevation: 90 m (300 ft)
- Highest elevation: 160 m (520 ft)
- Lowest elevation: 51 m (167 ft)
- Population (2023): 16,498
  - Density: 2,070/km^{2} (5,360/sq mi)
- Time zone: UTC+01:00 (CET)
  - Summer (DST): UTC+02:00 (CEST)
- INSEE/Postal code: 91471 /91400
- ^{1} French Land Register data, which excludes lakes, ponds, glaciers > 1 km^{2} (0.386 sq mi or 247 acres) and river estuaries.

Orsay (French pronunciation: [ɔʁsɛ]) is a commune in the Essonne department in Île-de-France in northern France. It is located in the southwestern suburbs of Paris, France, 20.7 km (12.9 mi) from the centre of Paris.

A fortified location of the Chevreuse valley since the 8th century and agricultural domain of wealthy and influential people, the development of Orsay is marked by the introduction of a railroad in the second half of the 18th century (today the RER B of which two stations are located in Orsay) and donations which allow the construction of a hospital still active to this day.

Orsay is the main home to the Paris-Saclay University. The university significantly shapes Orsay's economy as it employs about 10,000 academic workers. The city's economy is also centered on high technology, with several companies drawn to the area by the Paris-Saclay's research and development infrastructure.

Orsay is home to the Orsay campus of Paris-Saclay University and is crossed by the N118 national road. It is a residential town in the Paris metropolitan area and the Chevreuse valley, within the Paris-Saclay scientific cluster, and has laboratories of the CNRS and the Curie Institute.

== History ==
There has been a village called Orsay on this site since 999, and the first church there was built in 1157. From the sixteenth century, the town and surrounding area were owned by the Boucher family, and it was in honor of the family that Louis XIV gave the quai d'Orsay its name. This is the reason that the Musée d'Orsay is not in Orsay. In the eighteenth century, the family of Grimod du Fort bought the land and received the title of Comte d'Orsay. In 1870, during the Franco-Prussian war, Orsay was occupied by the Prussian army. 88 young "Orcéens" were killed in the First World War.

In 1957, largely due to the influence of Frédéric and Irène Joliot-Curie, the Institut de physique nucléaire (nuclear physics institute) was opened in the Chevreuse valley, and the region, especially Orsay, became an important scientific centre. Another development was the creation of the University of Paris-Sud, whose most important faculty is the faculty of science.

On 19 February 1977, a part of the territory of Orsay was detached and merged with a part of the territory of Bures-sur-Yvette to create the commune of Les Ulis.

== Population ==
Inhabitants of Orsay are known as Orcéens in French.

Historical population
Year	Pop.	±% p.a.
1968	12,087	—
1975	13,530	+1.62%
1982	14,057	+0.55%
1990	14,849	+0.69%
1999	16,236	+1.00%
2007	16,411	+0.13%
2012	15,880	−0.66%
2017	16,421	+0.67%
2023	16,498	+0.08%
Source: INSEE

== Education ==
=== Higher education ===
The Paris-Saclay University, former University of Paris in Orsay, dominates the city of Orsay, providing the city with its distinctive college-town character. University buildings are located in the north of the city and the campus is divided between several other cities such as Gif-sur-Yvette, Bures-sur-Yvette and Palaiseau.

Colleges that are part of the Paris-Saclay University in Orsay:

- ENS Paris-Saclay;
- CentraleSupélec;
- Paris-Saclay Faculty of Sciences;
- Paris-Saclay Polytechnic School;
- Orsay University Institute of Technology;
- Paris-Saclay Undergraduate School.

== Transport ==
Orsay is served by two stations on Paris RER line B: Le Guichet and Orsay-Ville.

== Neighbourhoods of Orsay ==
- Le Guichet
- Mondétour
- Le Petit Madagascar
- Corbeville
- Le Moulon

== Nearby towns ==
- Bures-sur-Yvette
- Gif-sur-Yvette
- Saclay
- Palaiseau
- Villebon-sur-Yvette
- Les Ulis

== Places of worship ==
The territory of the city is divided in two catholic parishes which depend on the diocese of Évry–Corbeil-Essonnes and the deanery of Yvette-Gif-Orsay. The parish of Ulis-Montdétour-Montjay serves the neighborhood of Montdétour, bois du Roi and bois Persan, while the parish of Orsay serves the rest of the city. These parishes have the main church of Saint-Martin-Saint-Laurent, the chapel of la Clarté-Dieu and the chapel of Notre-Dame-de-la-Plaine at Mondétour. Additionally, the city has a Portuguese evangelical parish and an international evangelical church: the église évangélique vie et paix. A Buddhist Khuông Viêt pagoda is also located in the city.

== Civil heritage ==
=== Forested areas ===
- The Bois des Rames around the university campus
- The Bois Persan
- Parc botanique de Launay

=== Architecture ===
- la Grande Bouvêche
- la Pacaterie
- le Temple de la Gloire
- le château de Corbeville

=== Notable residents ===
- Adam Allouche, swimmer
- Mickael Antoine-Curier, footballer
- Moussa Badiane, basketball player
- Guy Demel, footballer
- Edward VIII of the United Kingdom, later Duke of Windsor after abdicating the throne and marrying American divorcee Wallis Simpson
- Pierre-Gilles de Gennes, Nobel prizewinning physicist, died in Orsay
- Sega Keita, footballer
- Sir Oswald Mosley, Bt., leader of the British Union of Fascists
- Lady Diana Mosley, one of the Mitford sisters and wife of Sir Oswald Mosley
- Angelique Spincer, handball player
- Teddy Venel, athlete
- Wallis, Duchess of Windsor, American wife of Edward VIII of the United Kingdom
