= Bures-sur-Yvette =

Commune in Île-de-France, France

- Commune
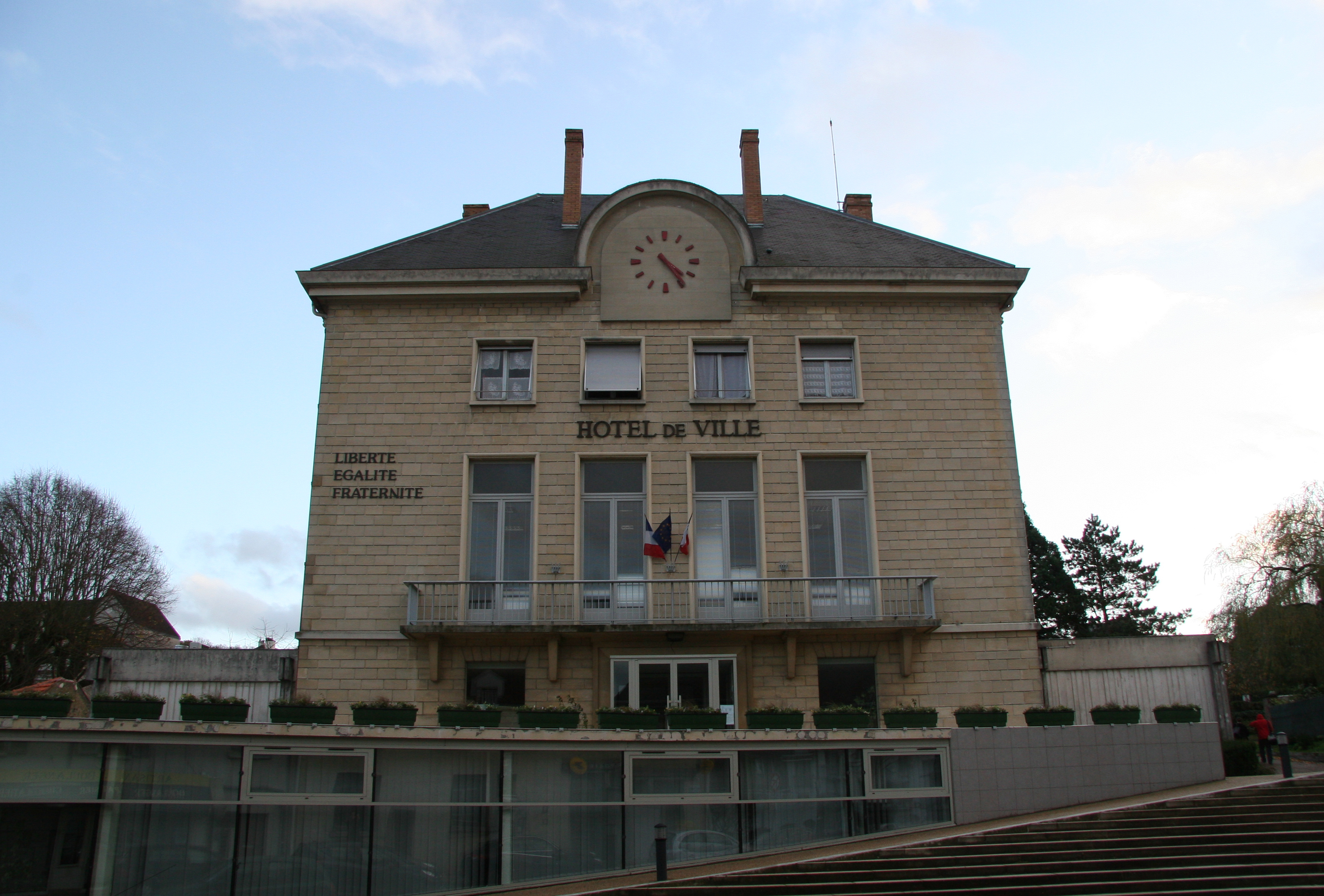
- The town hall of Bures-sur-Yvette

- Coat of arms
- Location of Bures-sur-Yvette
- Location within France Location within Île-de-France (region)
- Coordinates: 48°41′49″N 2°09′50″E
- Country: France
- Region: Île-de-France
- Department: Essonne
- Arrondissement: Palaiseau
- Canton: Gif-sur-Yvette
- Intercommunality: CA Paris-Saclay

Government
  - Mayor (2020–2026): Jean-François Vigier
- Area^{1}: 4.17 km^{2} (1.61 sq mi)
- Highest elevation: 163 m (535 ft)
- Lowest elevation: 56 m (184 ft)
- Population (2023): 9,548
  - Density: 2,290/km^{2} (5,930/sq mi)
- Demonym: Buressois
- Time zone: UTC+01:00 (CET)
  - Summer (DST): UTC+02:00 (CEST)
- INSEE/Postal code: 91122 /91440
- Website: www.bures-sur-yvette.fr
- ^{1} French Land Register data, which excludes lakes, ponds, glaciers > 1 km^{2} (0.386 sq mi or 247 acres) and river estuaries.

Bures-sur-Yvette (French pronunciation: [byʁ syʁ ivɛt], lit. "Bures-on-Yvette") is a commune in the Essonne department in the Île-de-France region in Northern France. It is a southern Parisian outer suburb in the Vallée de Chevreuse.

== Geography ==
Bures-sur-Yvette is located in the Vallée de Chevreuse on the river Yvette, along which the RER B line is laid. The stations on the line serving the commune are Bures-sur-Yvette and La Hacquinière. Adjacent communes are Orsay, Gif-sur-Yvette, Gometz-le-Châtel and Les Ulis. The small town is also twinned with Crewkerne, England.

== Demographics ==
Inhabitants of Bures-sur-Yvette are known as Buressois (masculine) and Buressoises (feminine) in French.

Historical population
Year	Pop.	±% p.a.
1968	5,733	—
1975	6,870	+2.62%
1982	7,764	+1.76%
1990	9,227	+2.18%
1999	9,679	+0.53%
2007	9,773	+0.12%
2012	9,726	−0.10%
2017	9,804	+0.16%
2023	9,548	−0.44%
Source: INSEE

== Research ==
Bures-sur-Yvette hosts the greater part of the Orsay campus of the University of Paris-Sud (Paris XI), as well as the Institut des Hautes Études Scientifiques (IHÉS).

== See also ==
- Communes of the Essonne department
- William of Bures, knight, Prince of Galilee
