= Marielle Chartier =

Physicist

- Education: University of Paris-Sud; University of Caen Normandy (PhD)
- Known for: ALICE experiment
- Scientific career
- Workplaces: University of Liverpool; University of Bordeaux; CERN; Michigan State University
- Thesis: Direct mass measurements of ^{100}Sn and exotic nuclei near the N = Z line (1996)
- Doctoral advisor: Wolfgang Mittig
- Website: www.liverpool.ac.uk/physics/staff/marielle-chartier/

Marielle Chartier is a Professor of Particle Physics at the University of Liverpool in England. Her research investigates the phase diagram of nuclear matter using the ALICE experiment at the Large Hadron Collider (LHC) at CERN Her past work includes nuclear structure at the frontiers of the valley of stability.

== Education ==
Chartier studied physics at the University of Paris-Sud and completed a third-year project at the French Atomic Energy Commission (Commissariat a l'Energie Atomique) in condensed matter physics. She completed her fourth year project at the National Superconducting Cyclotron Laboratory (NSCL) in the USA. She was awarded her PhD from the University of Caen Normandy in 1996 for research completed at the Grand Accélérateur National d'Ions Lourds. During her PhD, she spoke at the International Conference on Exotic Nuclei.

== Career and research ==
After her PhD, Chartier was a postdoctoral researcher for two years at the National Superconducting Cyclotron Laboratory (NSCL) at Michigan State University. In 1999 Chartier was appointed lecturer at the University of Bordeaux. She worked at the Centre d'Etudes Nucléaires de Bordeaux-Gradignan on exotic nuclei. She wanted to focus more on research, successfully applied for an Engineering and Physical Sciences Research Council (EPSRC) Advanced Fellowship and joined the Nuclear Physics group at the University of Liverpool in 2001. This allowed her to establish an entirely new research area, exploring exotic nuclear physics and the valley of stability. At the University of Liverpool Chartier teaches Nuclear Physics. She is interested in ways to measure the masses of exotic nuclei. To do this, she uses a cyclotron as a mass spectrometer. She also worked on light, neutron rich nuclei using knock out reactions.

In 2010 Chartier was part of a multi-million pound grant to work on the Facility for Antiproton and Ion Research (FAIR) in Darmstadt. She is interested in the valley of stability. She led the UK involvement with the Nuclear Structure, Astrophysics and Reactions (NuSTAR) experiments, studying the nuclear drip line, the ordering of quantum states and symmetry of near-stable nuclei. In 2013 she led the UK collaboration with the nuclear physics laboratory FAIR. She was the leader of the international R3B spectrometer project, which included the development of a silicon detector that could information about the extreme structure of matter inside stars.

Today, Chartier works on Hadronic matter. She led the University of Liverpool joining the ALICE experiment in 2013 and became interested in Charm quarks. Despite spending her early research career working on nuclear physics, Chartier had considerable experience working on heavy-ion collisions with fixed targets at low energies. In 2015 Chartier was awarded a £1.05 million grant from the Science and Technology Facilities Council (STFC) for the upgrade of the ALICE experiment. She works on the strong force, using ultra-relativistic heavy ion interactions to study Quantum chromodynamics (QCD).
