= Terraplane (disambiguation) =

Terraplane is an automobile built by the Hudson Motor Car Company between 1932 and 1939.

Terraplane may also refer to:

- Terraplane, the name for a series of French hovercraft from the 1960s and 70s
- Terraplane (band) a 1980s pop rock group from London, England
- Terraplane (album), a 2015 album by Steve Earle
- Terraplane (novel), a 1988 science fiction novel by Jack Womack
- "Terraplane Blues", a blues song recorded in 1936 by Robert Johnson

== See also ==
- Hydroplane
