= Saclay =

Commune in Île-de-France, France

- Commune
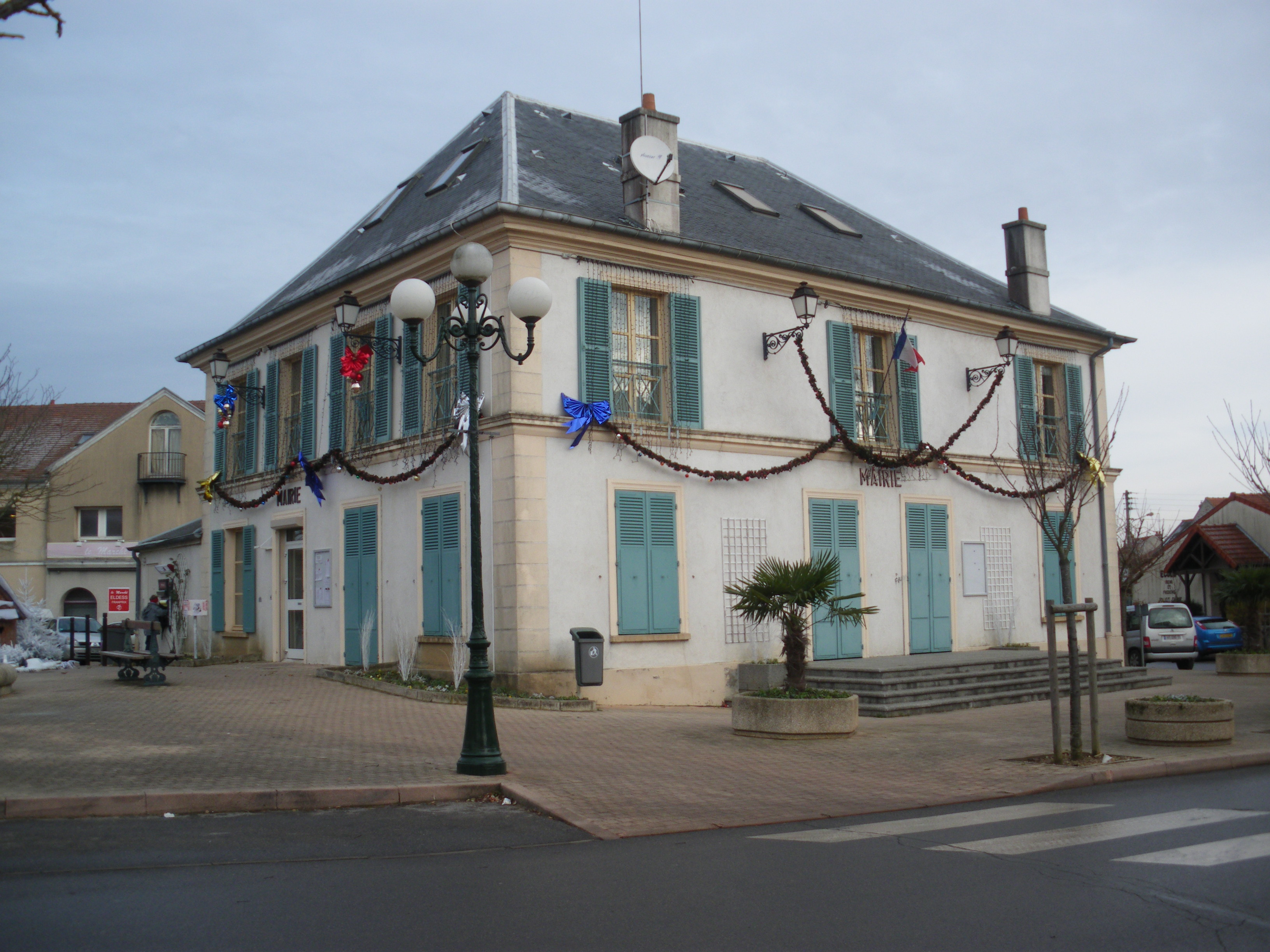
- Town hall

- Coat of arms

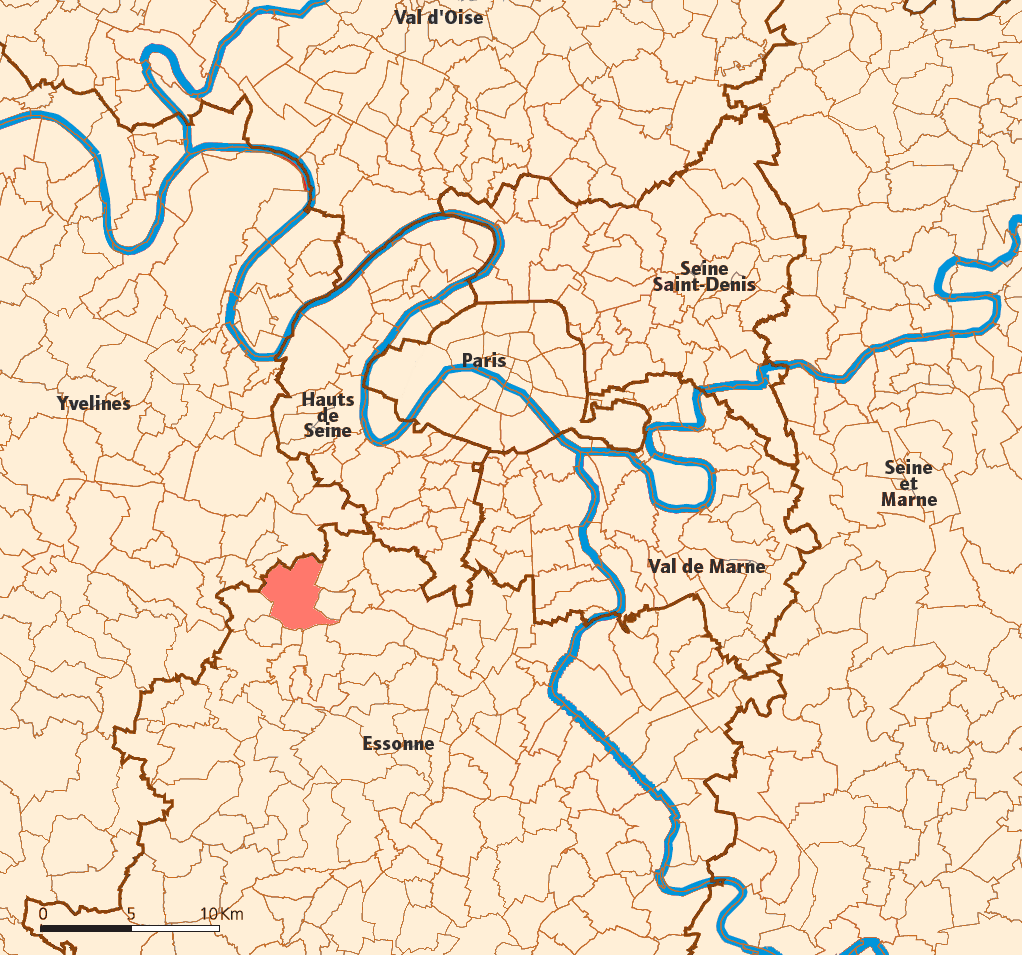
- Location (in red) within Paris inner and outer suburbs
- Location of Saclay
- Location within France Location within Île-de-France (region)
- Coordinates: 48°43′52″N 2°10′21″E
- Country: France
- Region: Île-de-France
- Department: Essonne
- Arrondissement: Palaiseau
- Canton: Gif-sur-Yvette
- Intercommunality: CA Paris-Saclay

Government
  - Mayor (2020–2026): Michel Senot
- Area^{1}: 13.65 km^{2} (5.27 sq mi)
- Elevation: 147 m (482 ft)
- Highest elevation: 161 m (528 ft)
- Lowest elevation: 108 m (354 ft)
- Population (2023): 4,437
  - Density: 325.1/km^{2} (841.9/sq mi)
- Time zone: UTC+01:00 (CET)
  - Summer (DST): UTC+02:00 (CEST)
- INSEE/Postal code: 91534 /91400
- ^{1} French Land Register data, which excludes lakes, ponds, glaciers > 1 km^{2} (0.386 sq mi or 247 acres) and river estuaries.

Saclay (French: [saklɛ]) is a commune in the southwestern suburbs of Paris, France. It is located 18.7 km (11.6 mi) from the centre of Paris. It is best known for the large scientific facility CEA Saclay, mostly dealing with nuclear and particle physics.

== Population ==
Historical population
Year	Pop.	±% p.a.
1968	1,991	—
1975	2,037	+0.33%
1982	1,865	−1.25%
1990	2,894	+5.65%
1999	2,883	−0.04%
2007	3,013	+0.55%
2012	3,637	+3.84%
2017	4,029	+2.07%
2023	4,437	+1.62%
Source: INSEE

Inhabitants of Saclay are known as Saclaysiens in French.

== Transport ==
Saclay is served by no station of the Paris Métro, or suburban rail network (RER). The closest station to Saclay is Le Guichet station on Paris RER line B. This station is located in the neighboring commune of Orsay, 3.2 kilometres (2 miles) to the south of the town center of Saclay. The commune will have one station, Christ de Saclay, on the under-construction Paris Metro Line 18.

== See also ==
- Communes of the Essonne department
- Plateau de Saclay
