= Aérotrain =

Experimental vehicle

Coordinates: 48.02833°N 1.88433°E

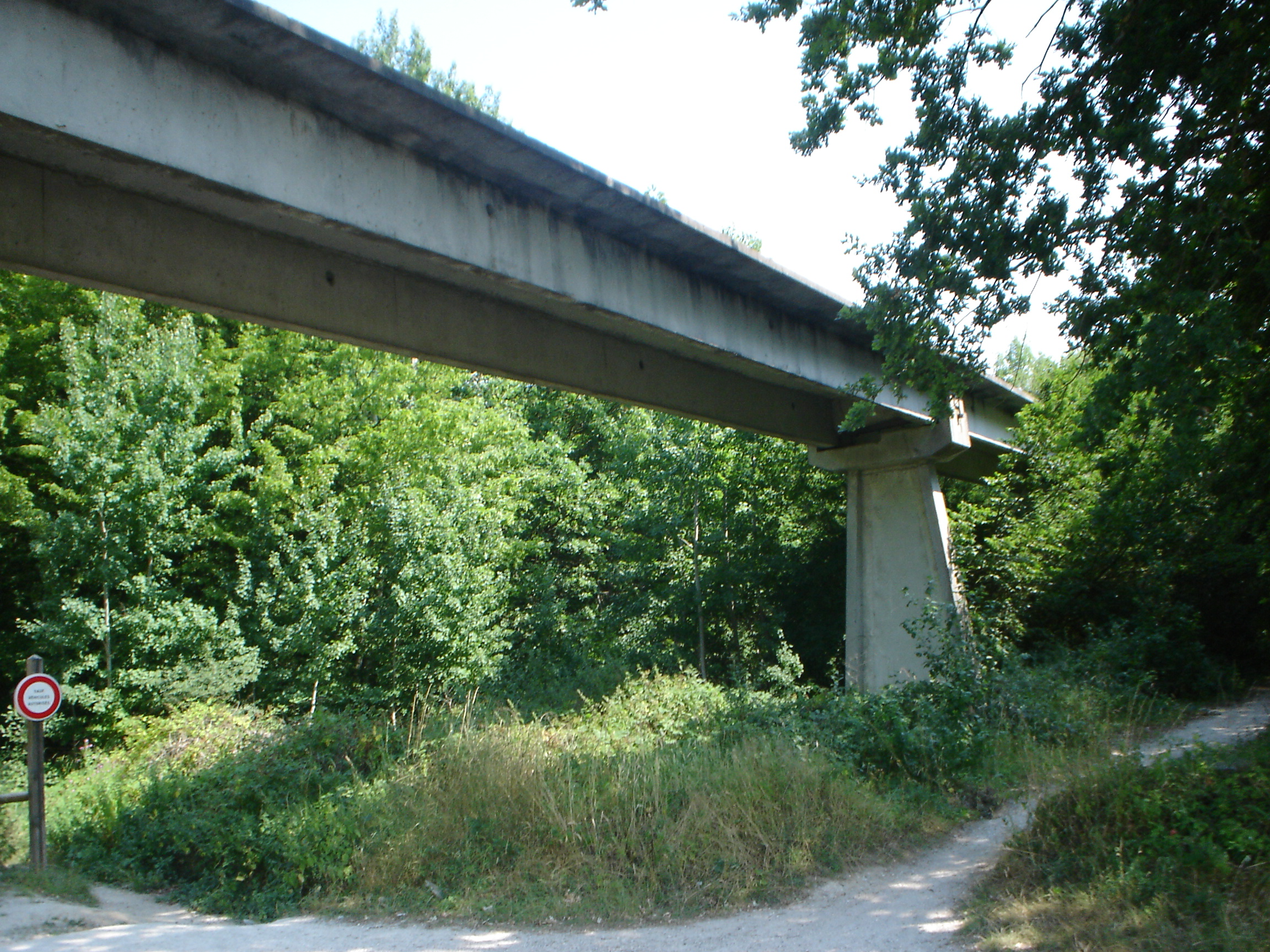
A remaining section of the Aérotrain track near Saran, Loiret, 2006

The Aérotrain (French: [aeʁotʁɛ̃]) was an experimental Tracked Air Cushion Vehicle (TACV), or hovertrain, developed in France from 1965 to 1977 under the engineering leadership of Jean Bertin (1917–1975) – and intended to bring the French rail network to the cutting edge of land-based public transport.

Though similar to a maglev design, which levitates a train car over a complex electromagnetic track to eliminate all resistance other than aerodynamic drag, the Aérotrain – also a "train without wheels" – rode on an air cushion over a simple reinforced concrete track or guideway and could travel at the speed of a maglev train, without the further technical complexity and expense of its track. In many respects, the entire concept resembled a product of the aircraft rather than rail industry.

== History ==
In 1969, a U.S. company, Rohr Industries, licensed the Aérotrain technology to build the hovertrains in the United States. That same year the Aérotrain established the world record for a TACV, the pilots saying that with a longer track even higher speeds could have been reached without major difficulties. The final prototype, the Aérotrain I80, set a world speed record in 1974 for overland air cushion vehicles, reaching a speed of 417.6 km/h (259.5 mph) and a peak speed of 430.3 km/h (267.4 mph). The prototypes, which ultimately used twin turbine engines through a ducted propeller with seven blades, demonstrated they could accelerate and decelerate quickly, which offered a huge advantage of enabling effective service between tightly spaced stops.

In September 1972 US Secretary of Transportation John Volpe, the mayor of Los Angeles and representatives and transport specialists from over 18 countries travelled to France and attended the test rides, studied the system and reported on the Aérotrain. Bertin felt the technology was sufficiently realized for full implementation, and the French government signed a contract to implement full-scale service on the outskirts of Paris, between Cergy and La Défense. The Aérotrain nonetheless ran into increasing internal conflicts with its client SNCF, which had no research and development department of its own and strongly favoured improving the existing rail system.

Aérotrain faced numerous design challenges. The system would require new elevated guideways for every implementation – further pitting Aérotrain against efforts to improve the existing "wheeled" rail system. Bertin's Versailles-based companies, Bertin and Co and Aeroglide Systems, worked to resolve issues with sudden changes in air pressure, as when the train would pass another train or enter a tunnel. Prototypes used gas turbines with giant propellers, which created tremendous noise both inside and outside the train car itself – and thus required reduced speeds in urban areas. SNCF felt they already had trains that could run at those reduced speeds. Proponents pointed out electric linear induction motors could make the TACV silent. Eventually SNCF simply opposed the project, citing a broad litany of concerns.

In 1974, after his election as President of France, Valéry Giscard d’Estaing formally annulled the contract for the Aérotrain Cergy-La Défense line and SNCF formally shifted support to the TGV as its high-speed ground-transport solution. Notably, D'Estaing's wife was the granddaughter of Eugène Schneider, founder of what became an international syndicate, Schneider Group. Noted Belgian journalist Karel Vereycken pointed out: "the Schneider dynasty have been and are still a pillar of the history of the French railroad and steel industry. Hence, the innovation of the Aérotrain (to be built by the aircraft industry) would not, in the short run, have made them more wealthy and one can easily imagine that a train without wheels does not get much enthusiastic approval of the feudal wheel producers." Rohr abandoned the technology in 1975.

== Test tracks ==
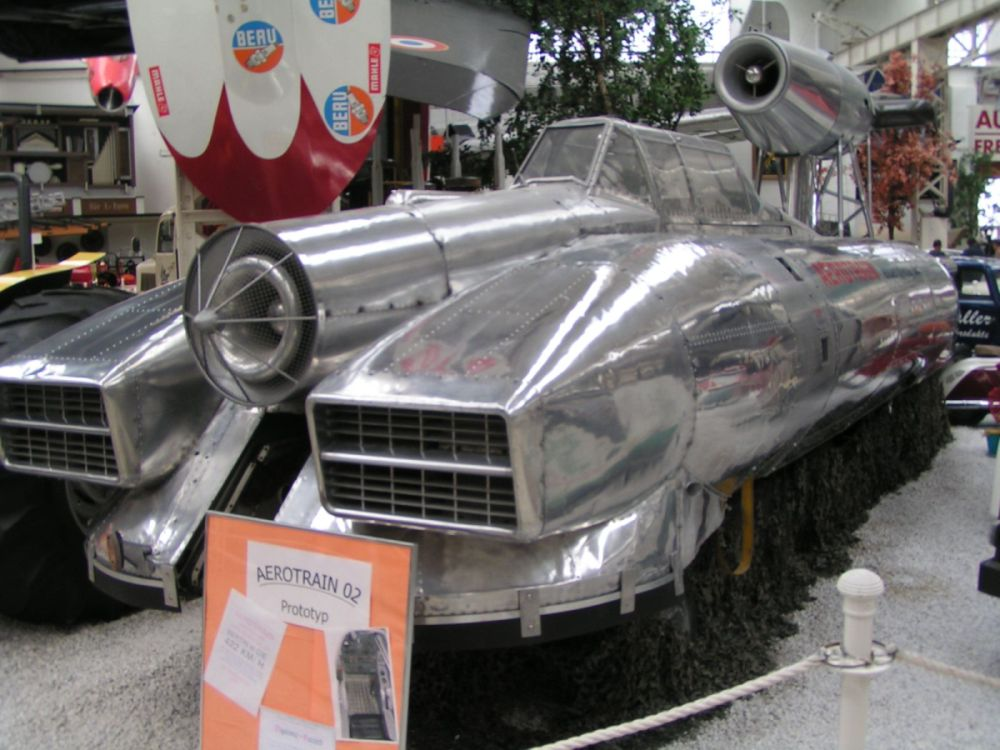
Aérotrain prototype #02

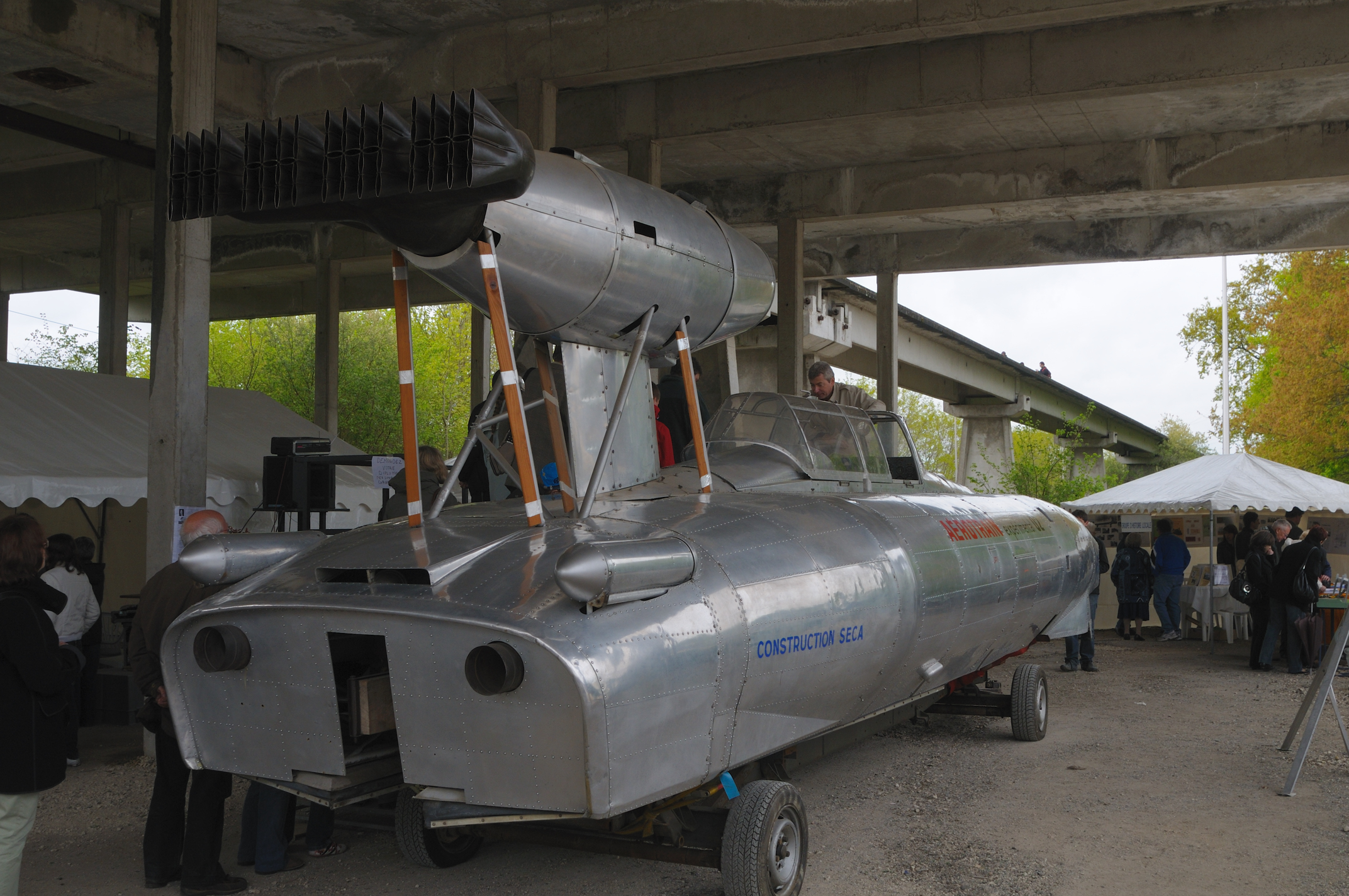
Prototype 02 of the aérotrain at an exhibition at Saran, 2009; rear view

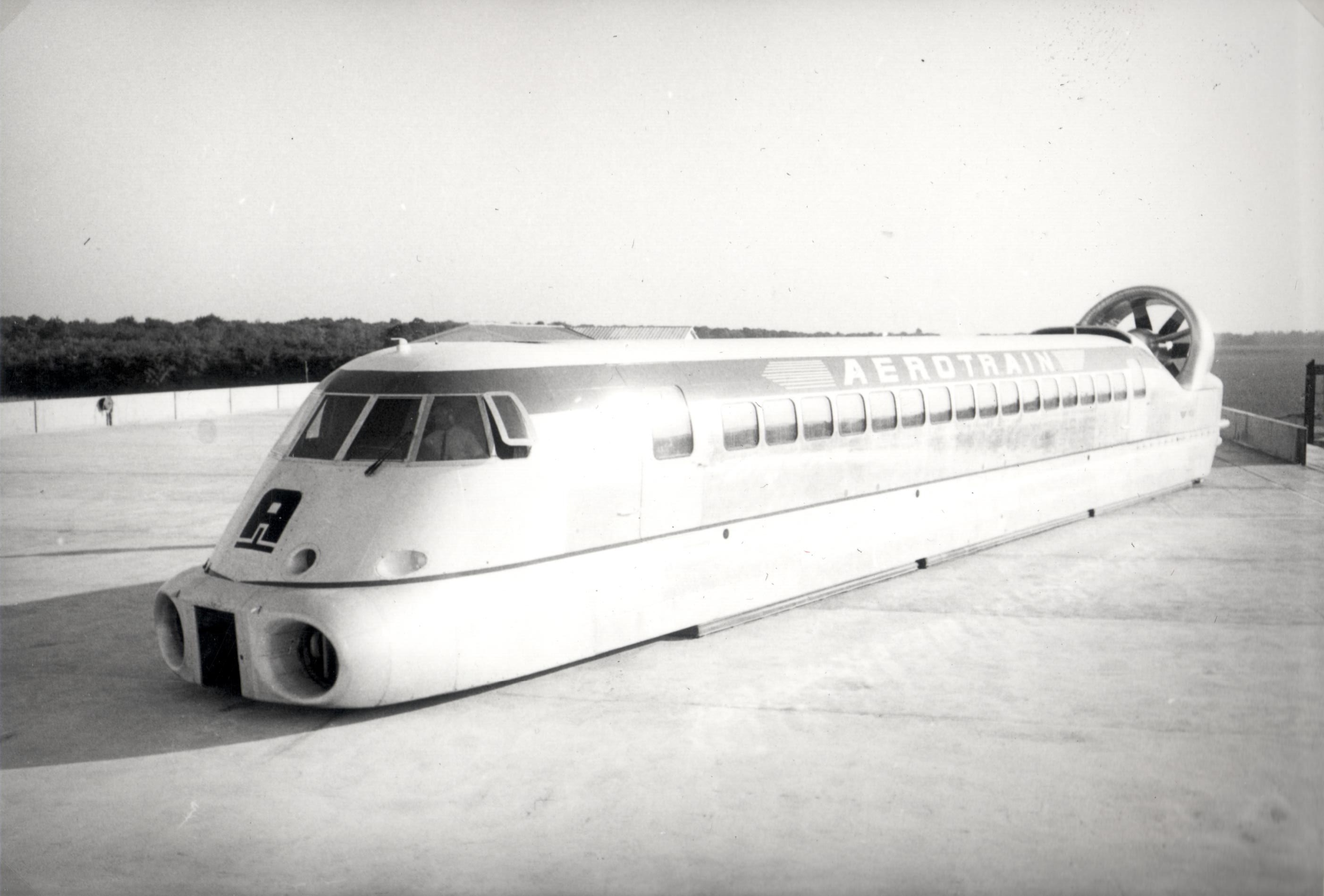
Aérotrain I80 upon delivery in 1969

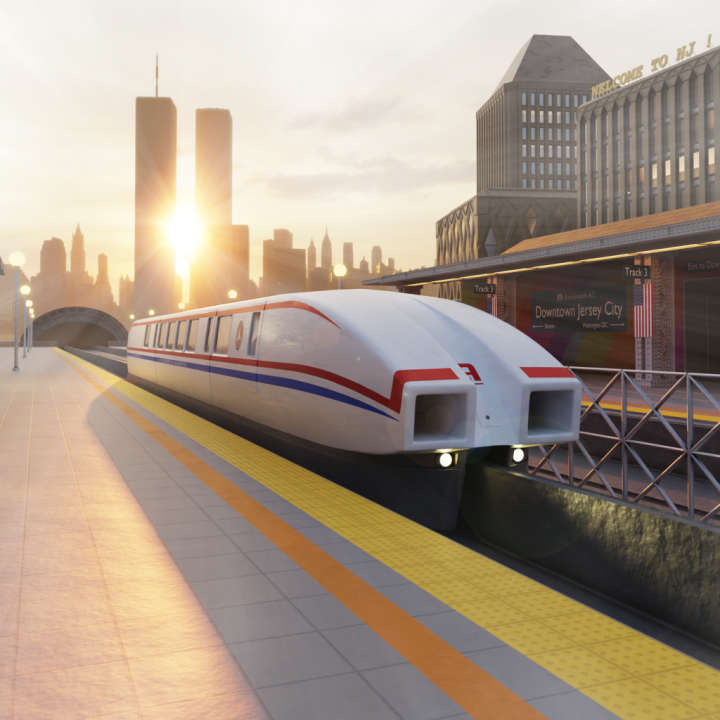
Artist's impression of a Rohr UTACV

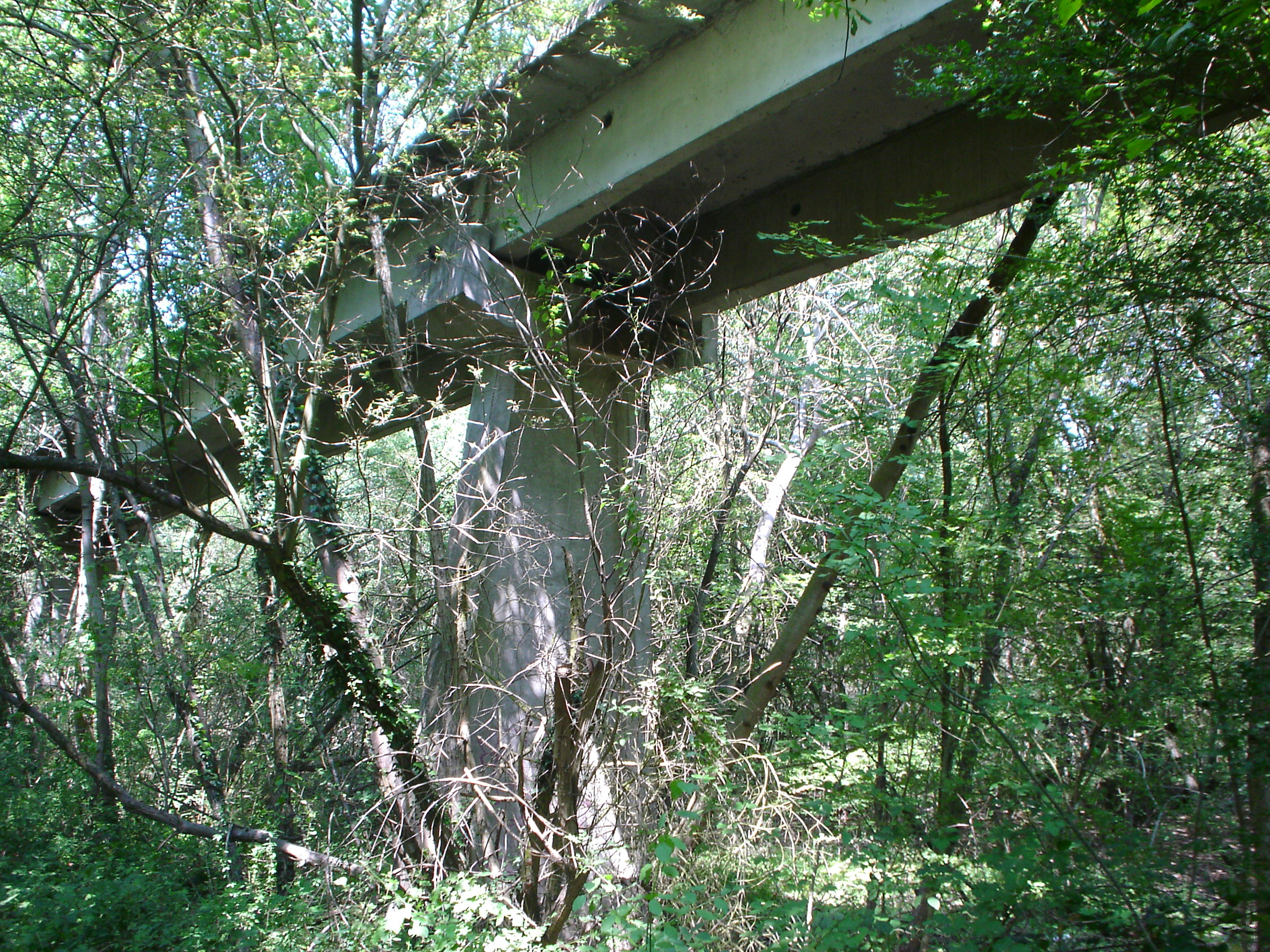
A remaining section of the Aérotrain track in the forest of Orléans near Saran, 2006

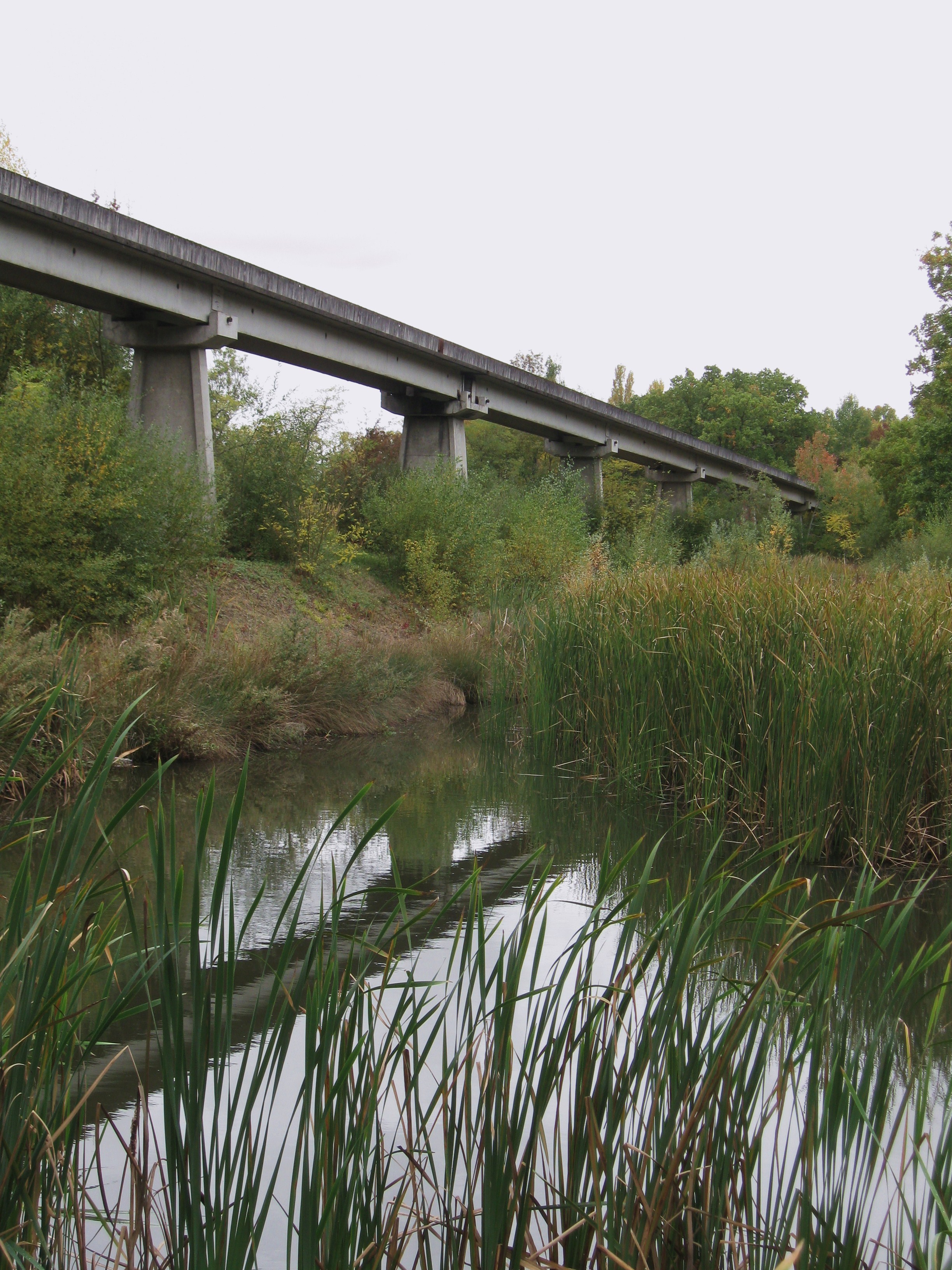
Saran Aérotrain rail

Aérotrain guideway at Chevilly

Most of the track for the Aérotrain was constructed of ferroconcrete to provide an inverted "T" shape for the monorail, with the tracks ultimately used only for experimental purposes.

- The first test track was 6.7 kilometres (4.2 mi) long and was built in February 1966 in Gometz-le-Châtel, Essonne, France, for Aérotrains 01 and 02, re-using an abandoned railway formation. The track is visible today, partially demolished for urban expansion, with most of the remaining track in ruins. A section was kept and restored as a memorial at a roundabout in Gometz.
- A second track made of aluminium and asphalt was built in 1969 for Aérotrain prototype S44 in Gometz-le-Châtel, built metres away from and parallel to the first track. The aluminium guide rail was disposed of after the tests, the rest of the asphalt track was kept intact and converted into a pedestrian path in 2008 and 2009.
- In 1969, a third, 18 km test track was built to test Aérotrain prototype I80. This test track was in Loiret, France, north from Orléans, stretching between Saran and Ruan, a location that would enable it to be used in a future Paris-Orléans line. The track was elevated 5 m above the ground, was supported by pillars and allowed speeds of 400 km/h (250 mph). A platform stood at each end of the line to reverse the train, while a hangar on the central platform at Chevilly housed the test vehicle. This line, while abandoned, became a famous landmark subject to disputes over its visual condition after the end of the Aérotrain programme – and remains today, visible to the east of RN20 and the Paris-Orléans railway line.
- Until 1974, a fourth, 2.4 km (1.5 mi) test track was to be found at the High Speed Ground Test Center near Pueblo, Colorado in the United States. This test track was built for the UTACV prototype. Due to its length, it was suited only for a top speed of 233 km/h (145 mph).

== Prototypes ==
Five prototypes were built:

- Aérotrain 01 was a 1/2 scale (10.11 m, 2.6 t) prototype. It was originally propelled by a three-bladed reversible-pitch propeller powered by a 190 kilowatts (260 hp) aircraft engine, which was later replaced by a Turbomeca Marboré jet engine. The air cushion is maintained by two 37 kilowatts (50 hp) compressors. It had places for four passengers and two crew.
- Aérotrain 02 (shown in picture in test track section) was another sub-scale prototype, seating two crew. It was powered by a Pratt & Whitney JT12 turbojet.
- Aérotrain S44 was a full-size passenger-carrying car intended for suburban commuter service at speeds of 200 km/h (in particular links between city centres and airports). It was equipped with a Linear Induction Motor (linear motor) propulsion system supplied by Merlin-Gérin.
- Aérotrain I80 was a full-size passenger-carrying car for intercity service. It was 25.6 m long, 3.2 m wide, 3.3 m high, had a mass of 11.25 t empty, and had 80 passenger seats. In its original configuration (as I80-250 for 250 km/h), it was propelled by twin Turbomeca Turmo III E3 turboshaft (1,200 kW (1,610 hp) each) powering a ducted propeller, 2.3 m in diameter, with seven blades of variable pitch. A Turbomeca Turmastazou 14 turboshaft engine powered the air compressors – six vertical for support and six horizontal for guidance. Braking was typically provided by reverse thrust of the propeller, and in emergencies by a friction brake on the central rail. External noise was 90–95 dBA at 60 metres (200 ft). I80-250 was later rebuilt for 350 km/h and re-designated as the I-80 HV (Haute Vitesse = high speed). The main change was the new propulsion system, a JT8D turbofan from Pratt & Whitney mounted on top. I-80 HV established the world speed record for overland air cushion vehicles on 5 March 1974 with a mean speed of 417.6 km/h (259.5 mph) and a peak speed of 430.4 km/h (267.4 mph).
- UTACV was a prototype built by Rohr Industries for the United States Department of Transportation's TACV programme, built under the Bertin Aérotrain licence in the United States.

=== The Rohr Aerotrain ===
In 1970, Rohr Industries decided to develop a tracked air-cushion vehicle as part of a project by the Urban Mass Transportation Administration (UMTA) to sponsor development of new mass-transit technology to meet future transit requirements.

The Rohr prototype, officially called the Urban Tracked Air Cushion Vehicle (UTACV) and colloquially the Rohr Aerotrain, was propelled by linear motor and was designed to carry 60 passengers at 240 km/h (150 mph). It had a length of 28 m (94 ft) and an empty weight of 20.8 tonnes (20,800 kg, 46,000 pounds).

A test track was built in Pueblo, Colorado, where the prototype reached speeds of 233 kilometres per hour (145 mph), constrained by the length of track. Funding from UMTA ceased and the Rohr Industries Aérotrain was never commercialized. The Rohr prototype Aérotrain remained on the premises of the Pueblo Weisbrod Aircraft Museum from approximately 1978 until July 2009, whereupon it was moved to the Pueblo Railway museum. The museum plans to open an Aérotrain exhibit within the test vehicle.

== Timeline ==
- 1963 — Jean Bertin presents a 1/12 scale model, 1.4 meters in length, to the public authorities and to SNCF.
- 15 April 1965 — Creation of the Société d'étude de l'Aérotrain (Company for the study of the Aérotrain).
- 16 December 1965 — Completion of the construction of the first prototype, Aérotrain 01.
- 21 February 1966 — Official inauguration in Seine-et-Oise (but now in Essonne) of the 6.7 km trial track for Aérotrain 01 between Gometz-le-Châtel and Limours (on the abandoned easement of the Paris-Chartres via Gallardon line). That day, in front of the press, Aérotrain 01 reached 100 km/h. Days later it reached 200 km/h.
- 23 December 1966 — An added rocket provides a combined power of 1,700 horsepower (1,300 kW), the Aérotrain 01 reached a speed of 303 km/h.
- 1 November 1967 — Equipped with a jet engine, Aérotrain 01 reached a speed of 345 km/h.
- 1967 — Construction of Aérotrain 02.
- May 1967 — Tests start with Aérotrain 02 on the Gometz-le-Châtel trial track, 300 km/h is attained.
- 22 January 1969 — With an added rocket, Aérotrain 02 reaches the record speed of 422 km/h.
- 1969 — Construction of an experimental 18 km track between Ruan, to the north of Artenay, and Saran (Orléans) in the Loiret.
- 7 July 1969 — The Aérotrain I80 prototype for 250 km/h is presented to the public.
- September 1969 — Tests start with Aérotrain I80 on the Orléans test track. 250 km/h attained on 13 September.
- 1969 — Construction of the Aérotrain S44. In tests from December 1969 to January 1972, it achieved 170 km/h on a 3 km-long test track.
- 7 March 1970 — Release of a postage stamp honoring the Aérotrain.
- 1970 — Rohr Industries starts the construction of the UTACV prototype in the United States.
- October 1973 — Reconstruction of the Aérotrain I80 for 350 km/h as the I80 HV.
- 1974 — The government abandons the project for the construction of an Aérotrain line between the Orly and Roissy airports for another between La Défense and Cergy in the Paris metropolitan area.
- 5 March 1974 — The Aérotrain I80 HV breaks the land speed record for rail vehicles for air-cushioned vehicles at 430.4 km/h.
- 21 June 1974 — The contract for a commercial line between La Défense and Cergy is signed.
- 17 July 1974 — The government abandons the La Défense-Cergy project.
- September 1975 — Announcement of a TGV line to be constructed between Paris and Lyon.
- 1974 — Testing with the Rohr Industries UTACV prototype at the High Speed Ground Test Center near Pueblo, Colorado, begins.
- October 1975 — The Rohr Industries UTACV prototype is mothballed after funding for the programme runs out.
- 21 December 1975 — Jean Bertin dies.
- 17 July 1991 — A fire destroys the Aérotrain S44 in its hangar at Gometz.
- 22 March 1992 — A fire destroys the Aérotrain I80 HV and the hangar at Chevilly. After clean-up operations, only the platform is left.
- July 2004 — The memory of the trials on the Gometz line is commemorated by the dedication of a roundabout in Gometz and a sculpture by Georges Saulterre representing the Aérotrain.
- February 2007 — A 120-meter-long section of track is demolished north of Chevilly to make way for the new A19 highway.
- August 2015 — The 20-meter-long span of track crossing the RD125 road adjacent to the platform at Chevilly was taken down, having been struck and damaged by an agricultural vehicle on 20 July. The beam remains on the ground between the road and the platform and is visible from the road.

== Other experimental hovercraft trains ==
- Grumman also developed an air-cushion transportation prototype (also known as tracked air cushion vehicle or TACV), tested within the same facility in Pueblo, which also stopped when UMTA funding ceased in the 1970s.
- In Britain a similar technology was developed under the name of Tracked Hovercraft.

== Legacy ==
Jean Bertin, suffering with cancer and overworked after a decade of effort, died in December 1975. The I-80 Aérotrain made its last trip on December 27, 1977. On July 17, 1991, the S-44 Aérotrain prototype was destroyed by fire in its storage facility at Gometz-la-Ville and in 1992 the I-80 prototype was destroyed in Chevilly by arson. Of the four prototypes that had been built, the last two remain stored in Versailles, France.

Jean Bertin's company, now Bertin-Technologie, remains in business, focusing on the aerospace, defense, and transportation sectors. Outside Orléans, the remains of the abandoned and partially-demolished elevated concrete test track still stand to this day, easily visible from the parallel SNCF Paris-Orléans railway.

== See also ==
- Duke University Medical Center Patient Rapid Transit
- Ground effect train
- Hovertrain
- Huntsville Hospital Tram System
- Minneapolis–St. Paul Airport Trams
- N500 Naviplane
- Narita Airport Terminal 2 Shuttle System – cars floated on a 0.2-mm layer of air
- Old Dominion University maglev
- Otis Hovair
- SAFEGE
- Schienenzeppelin – a 1930s German train using a propeller, but on a conventional track
- Skymetro
- Tracked Hovercraft
- Transrapid 03
