= Bures-sur-Yvette station =

Railway station in Bures-sur-Yvette, France

Bures-sur-Yvette
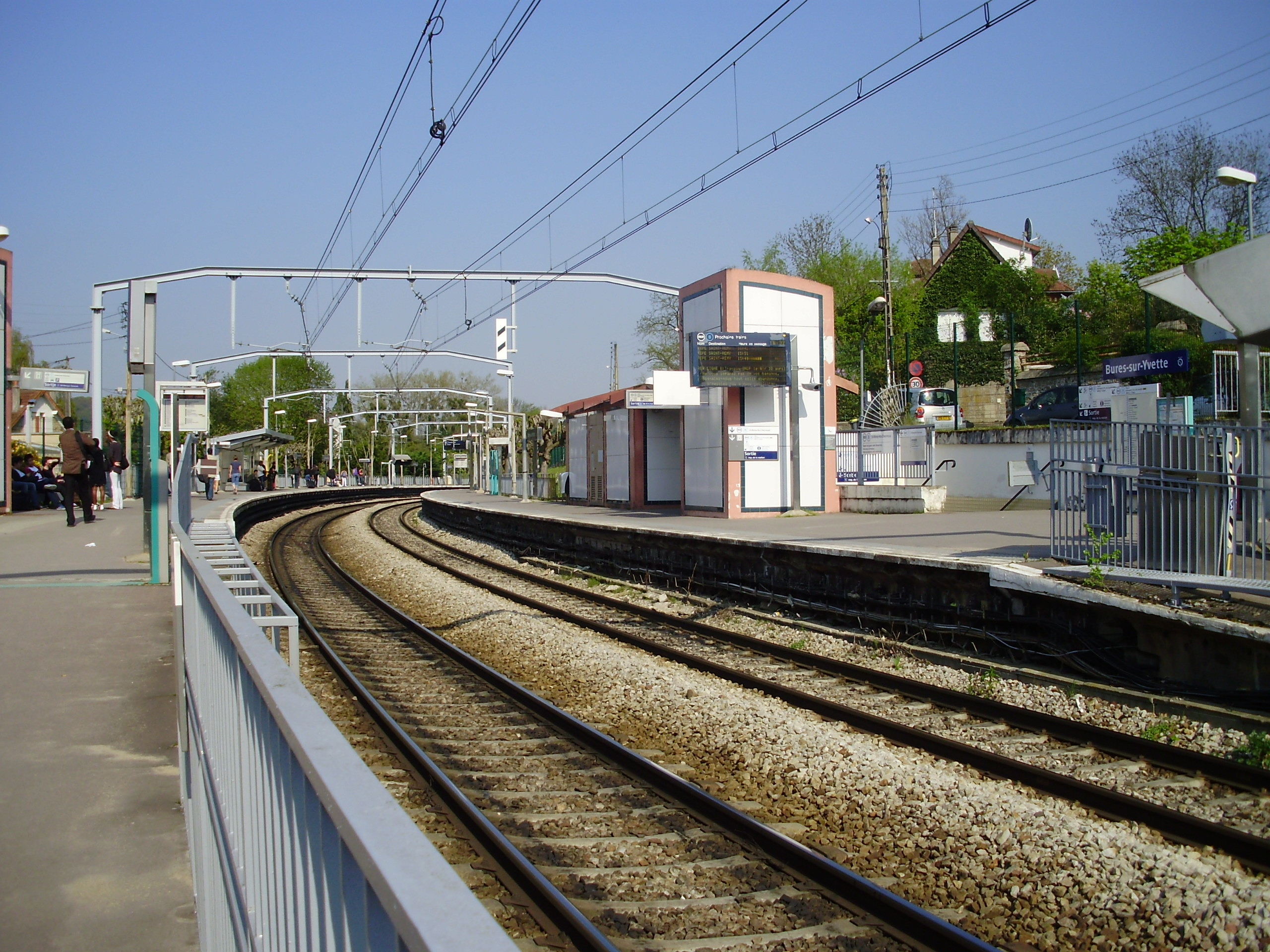
- Bures-sur-Yvette station platforms

General information
- Location: Bures-sur-Yvette; France
- Coordinates: 48°41′45″N 2°9′48″E
- Operator: RATP Group
- Line: Ligne de Sceaux
- Platforms: 2 side platforms
- Tracks: 2

Construction
- Structure type: At-grade
- Parking: 125 spaces
- Accessible: Yes, by request to staff

Other information
- Station code: 87758854
- Fare zone: 5

Services
Preceding station	RER	Following station
Orsay-Ville towards Aéroport Charles de Gaulle 2 TGV or Mitry–Claye	RER B	La Hacquinière towards Saint-Rémy-lès-Chevreuse
Location

Bures-sur-Yvette station is one of the two RER B station of Bures-sur-Yvette, near Paris, in France. This station is used to access University of Paris-Sud, and Institut des Hautes Études Scientifiques.
