= Le Guichet station =

Railway station in Orsay, France

Le Guichet
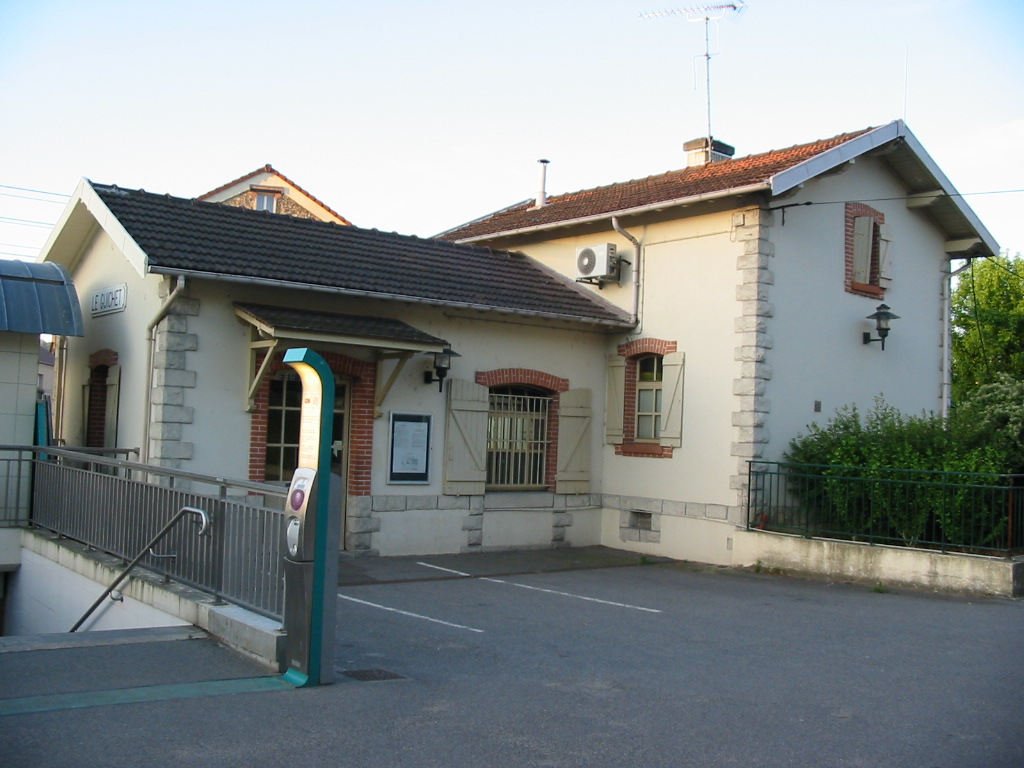
- Entrance to Le Guichet station

General information
- Location: Orsay; France
- Coordinates: 48°42′18″N 2°11′30″E
- Operator: RATP Group
- Line: Ligne de Sceaux
- Platforms: 2 side platforms
- Tracks: 2

Construction
- Structure type: At-grade
- Cycle facilities: Covered racks
- Accessible: Yes, by request to staff

Other information
- Station code: 87758839
- Fare zone: 5

Services
Preceding station	RER	Following station
Lozère towards Aéroport Charles de Gaulle 2 TGV or Mitry–Claye	RER B	Orsay-Ville towards Saint-Rémy-lès-Chevreuse
Location

Le Guichet station (French: Gare du Guichet) is one of the two RER stations of Orsay, near Paris, in France. It is also the name of a district of this town.

This station is built near a bridge over Route nationale 118. It serves Orsay and a large part of the scientific organisation that can be found near by, such as the ones in the plateau de Saclay (CNRS, school of CentraleSupélec).
