= La Hacquinière station =

Railway station in Bures-sur-Yvette, France

La Hacquinière
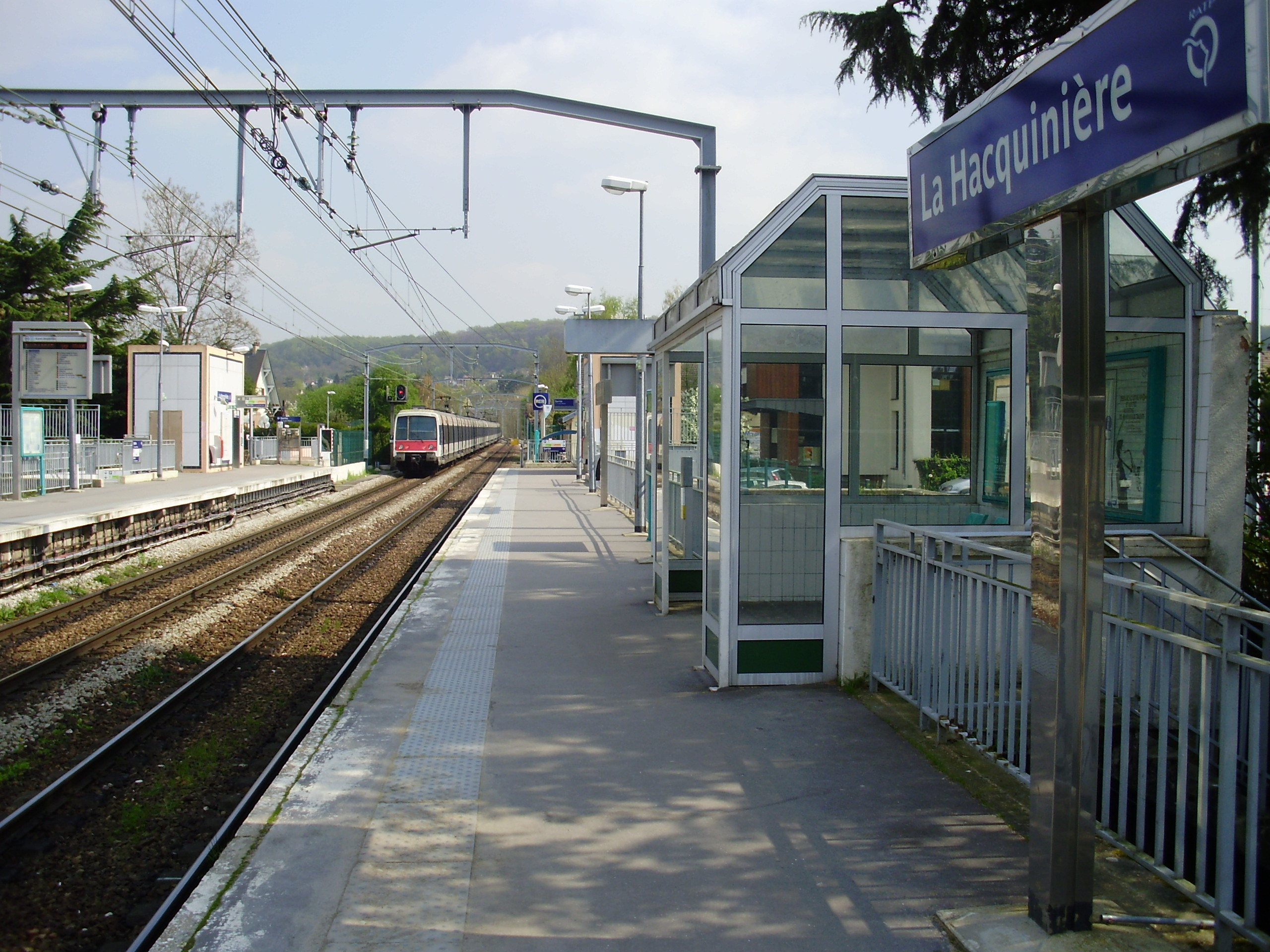
- La Hacquinière station platform

General information
- Location: Bures-sur-Yvette; France
- Coordinates: 48°41′42″N 2°9′9″E
- Operator: RATP Group
- Line: Ligne de Sceaux
- Platforms: 2 side platforms
- Tracks: 2

Construction
- Structure type: At-grade
- Parking: 53 spaces
- Cycle facilities: Covered racks
- Accessible: Yes, by request to staff

Other information
- Station code: 87758862
- Fare zone: 5

Services
Preceding station	RER	Following station
Bures-sur-Yvette towards Aéroport Charles de Gaulle 2 TGV or Mitry–Claye	RER B	Gif-sur-Yvette towards Saint-Rémy-lès-Chevreuse
Location

La Hacquinière stations (French pronunciation: [la akinjɛʁ]) is one of the two RER B stations of Bures-sur-Yvette, near Paris, in France. It is also the name of a district of this town.
