= Gallardon =

- Commune
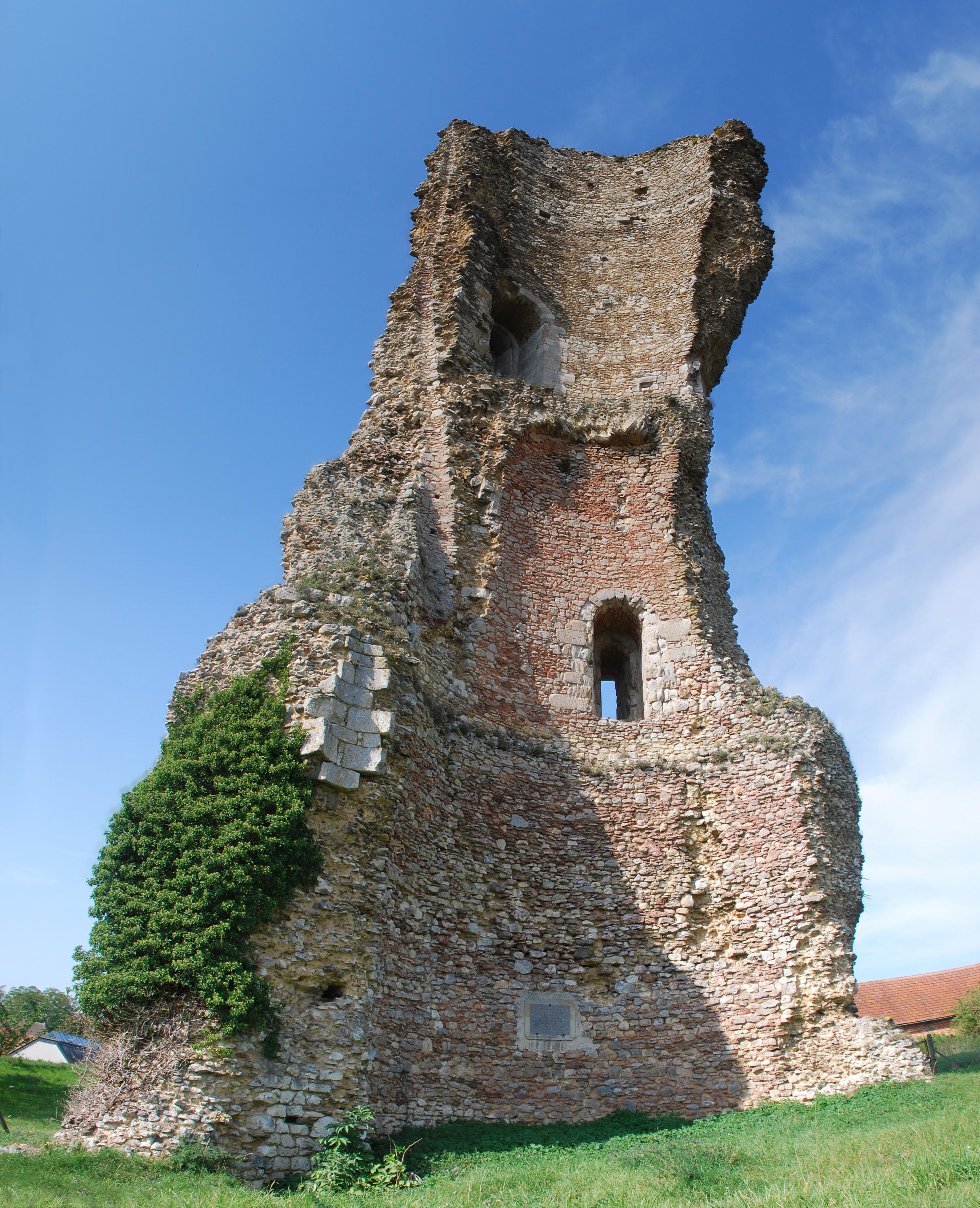
- Ruined tower

- Coat of arms
- Location of Gallardon
- Location within France Location within Centre-Val de Loire
- Coordinates: 48°31′32″N 1°41′27″E
- Country: France
- Region: Centre-Val de Loire
- Department: Eure-et-Loir
- Arrondissement: Chartres
- Canton: Auneau

Government
  - Mayor (2020–2026): Yves Marie
- Area^{1}: 11.27 km^{2} (4.35 sq mi)
- Elevation: 140 m (460 ft)
- Highest elevation: 158 m (518 ft)
- Lowest elevation: 107 m (351 ft)
- Population (2023): 3,530
  - Density: 313/km^{2} (811/sq mi)
- Time zone: UTC+01:00 (CET)
  - Summer (DST): UTC+02:00 (CEST)
- INSEE/Postal code: 28168 /28320
- ^{1} French Land Register data, which excludes lakes, ponds, glaciers > 1 km^{2} (0.386 sq mi or 247 acres) and river estuaries.

Gallardon (French pronunciation: [ɡalaʁdɔ̃]) is a commune in the Eure-et-Loir department in northern France. In 1972 it absorbed the former commune Montlouet.

== Population ==
Population data refer to the commune in its geography as of January 2025.

Historical population
Year	Pop.	±% p.a.
1968	1,850	—
1975	2,076	+1.66%
1982	2,303	+1.49%
1990	2,576	+1.41%
1999	3,510	+3.50%
2007	3,424	−0.31%
2012	3,529	+0.61%
2017	3,669	+0.78%
2023	3,530	−0.64%
Source: INSEE

== See also ==
- Communes of the Eure-et-Loir department
