= Paris-Sud University =

Former university in Paris, France

- Université Paris-Sud
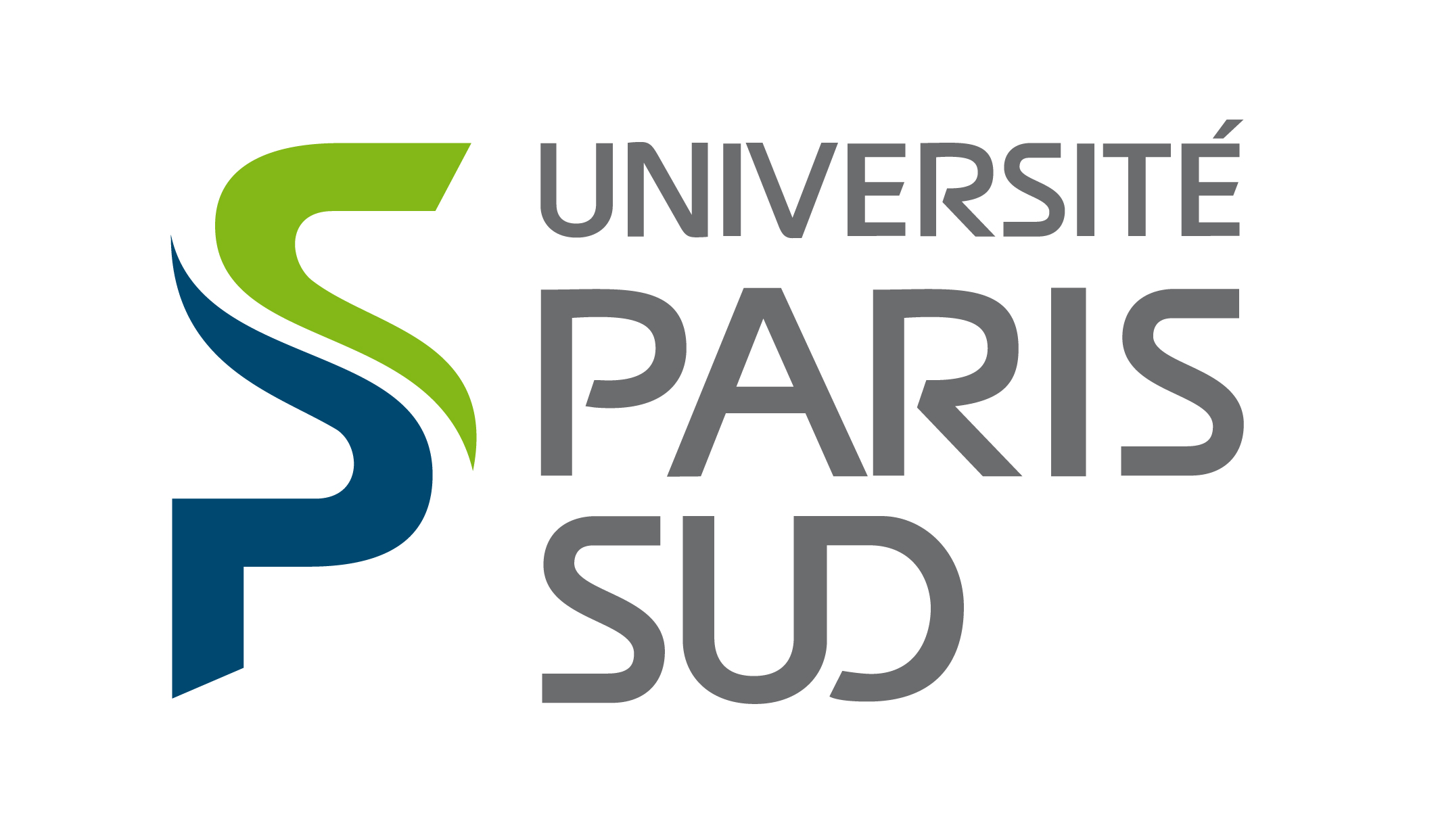
- Type: Public
- Active: 1971–2019
- Affiliations: University of Paris-Saclay, LERU
- Budget: €450 million
- Head: Sylvie Retailleau
- Academic staff: 2,461
- Administrative staff: 1,670
- Students: 27,307
- Undergraduates: 18,000
- Postgraduates: 9,000
- Location: Orsay, France
- Campus: Urban
- Language: French
- Website: www.universite-paris-saclay.fr

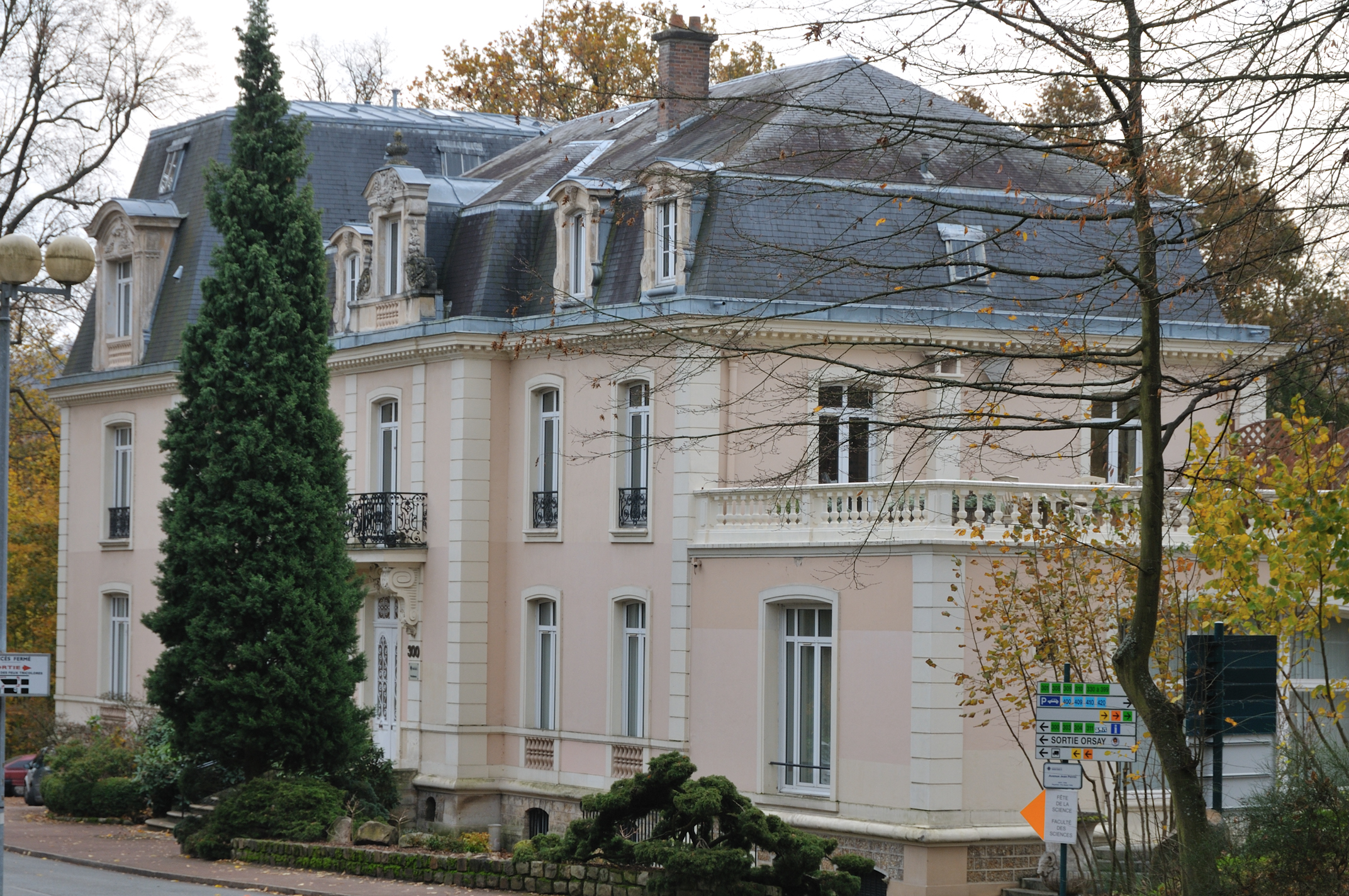
Headquarter of the presidency of the university, Orsay, France

Paris-Sud University (French: Université Paris-Sud), also known as Paris 11 or Paris XI, was a public research university based in the southern suburbs of Paris, including Orsay, Cachan, Châtenay-Malabry, Sceaux, and Kremlin-Bicêtre campuses. In 2019, the university was replaced by the Paris-Saclay University.

== History ==
Paris-Sud, as the Orsay Faculty of Sciences, was originally part of the University of Paris, which was subsequently split into several universities. After World War II, the rapid growth of nuclear physics and chemistry meant that research needed more and more powerful accelerators, which required large areas. The University of Paris, the École normale supérieure and the Collège de France looked for space in the south of Paris near Orsay. Later some of the teaching activity of the Faculty of Sciences in Paris was transferred to Orsay in 1956 at the request of Irène Joliot-Curie and Frédéric Joliot-Curie. The rapid increase of students led to the independence of the Orsay Campus on 1 March 1965 (sometimes called "Faculté des sciences d'Orsay" thereafter). The institution became the "University of Paris-Sud (Paris XI)" in 1971.

Paris-Sud hosted a great number of laboratories on its large (236 ha) campus. Many of the top French laboratories were among them especially in particle physics, nuclear physics, astrophysics, atomic physics and molecular physics, condensed matter physics, theoretical physics, electronics, nanoscience and nanotechnology. University of Paris-Sud comprised some 104 research units.

Nobel Prize winners Pierre-Gilles de Gennes, Albert Fert and Henri Kagan were affiliated to the University of Paris-Sud. A number of the most renowned French mathematicians were affiliated with the University of Paris-Sud as well. Among them are the Fields medalists Pierre Deligne, Laurent Lafforgue, Jean-Christophe Yoccoz, Wendelin Werner and Ngô Bảo Châu.

Paris-Sud also comprised biology and chemistry laboratories, engineering and technology schools and had established partnerships with many of the surrounding technology centres and Grandes Ecoles. It also included Schools of Law, Economics and Management.

In 2019, University Paris–Sud was replaced by the University of Paris-Saclay.

== Notable people ==
=== Fields Medal ===
- Pierre Deligne (Fields Medal, 1978)
- Jean-Christophe Yoccoz (Fields Medal, 1994)
- Laurent Lafforgue (Fields Medal, 2002)
- Wendelin Werner (Fields Medal, 2006)
- Ngô Bảo Châu (Fields Medal, 2010)
- Hong Wang (Fields Medal, 2026)

=== Nobel Prize ===
- Pierre-Gilles de Gennes (Nobel Prize in physics, 1991)
- Albert Fert (Nobel Prize in physics, 2007)
- Alain Aspect (Nobel Prize in Physics, 2022)
- Henri Kagan (Nobel Prize in Chemistry, 2026)

=== Others ===
- Aristides Baltas, philosopher of science, physicist, and former Minister of Culture and Sports of Greece, as well as Minister of Education and Religious Affairs
- Katarina Barley, German politician and lawyer, current Federal Minister of Justice and Consumer Protection in the fourth Cabinet of Angela Merkel
- Agnès Barthélémy, physicist, expert on nanostructures
- Étienne-Émile Baulieu, chemist
- Louis-Marie de Blignières, Traditionalist Catholic priest
- Charles Édouard Bouée, CEO of Roland Berger Consulting
- Olivier Bohuon, Chief Executive of Smith & Nephew plc
- Marielle Chartier, physicist
- Jean-Louis Colliot-Thélène, French mathematician
- Monique Combescure, French mathematical physicist
- Michel Davier, physicist
- Adrien Douady, mathematician
- Cornelia Druțu, Romanian mathematician, professor of mathematics at the University of Oxford
- Anne Dambricourt-Malassé, paleoanthropologist
- Jean-Marc Fontaine, mathematician
- Erol Gelenbe, Professor Univ. Paris-Sud (1979-1986), Computer Scientist, Fellow of the French Academy of Technologies, the Royal Academy of Science, Letters and Fine Arts of Belgium, The Science Academy Society of Turkey and other academies, Mustafa Prize 2017.
- Jean Ginibre, mathematician
- Kawtar Hafidi, physicist
- Henri B. Kagan, chemist, winner of the Wolf Prize in Chemistry (2001)
- André Lagarrigue, physicist
- Serge Latouche, economist
- Jean-Yves Le Gall, President of National Centre for Space Studies (CNES)
- Carlos Moreno, urbanist, academic and author
- André Neveu, physicist
- Véronique Newland, CEO, New Vision Technologies
- François Olivennes, physician and fertility specialist
- Siamak Mohammadi, professor of electrical and computer engineering at the University of Tehran
- Bernadette Perrin-Riou, mathematician and recipient of the Satter Prize
- Bertrand Serlet, former Senior Vice President of Software Engineering at Apple Inc.
- François Baccelli, mathematician and engineer

== Rankings ==
University rankings

Global – Overall
- ARWU World: 13 (2025)
- QS World: 73 (2025)
- THE World: 58 (2024)
- USNWR Global: 78 (2025)

- Following its merger, the successor institution Paris-Saclay University is ranked 1st in France, 1st in continental Europe, and 13th worldwide by the 2025 Academic Ranking of World Universities (ARWU). It maintains top-tier subject rankings, including 1st in Mathematics and 9th in Physics worldwide.
- Historically, prior to the 2020 merger, Paris-Sud was ranked 1st in France, 9th in Europe, and 37th worldwide by the 2019 ARWU.
- In the 2025 QS World University Rankings, Paris-Saclay University is ranked 73rd globally.
- In the 2024–2025 Times Higher Education World University Rankings, Paris-Saclay University is ranked 58th globally.
- In the 2025 U.S. News & World Report Best Global Universities Rankings, Paris-Saclay University is ranked 78th worldwide.

== Points of interest ==
- Parc botanique de Launay

== See also ==
- Institute of Space and Telecommunications Law (IDEST)
- University of Paris
