= Jean Bertin =

French scientist, engineer and inventor (1917–1975)

- Born: Jean Henri Bertin; 5 September 1917; Druyes-les-Belles-Fontaines, France
- Died: 21 December 1975 (aged 58); Neuilly-sur-Seine, France
- Resting place: Monblanc, France
- Education: École polytechnique; École nationale supérieure de l'aéronautique
- Known for: Aérotrain
- Scientific career
- Fields: Engineering
- Workplaces: Société nationale d'études et de construction de moteurs d'aviation

Jean Henri Bertin (French pronunciation: [ʒɑ̃ bɛʁtɛ̃]; 5 September 1917 – 21 December 1975) was a French scientist, engineer and inventor who is best known as the lead engineer for the French experimental Aérotrain mass transit system.

== Biography ==
Bertin was born in Druyes-les-Belles-Fontaines, Yonne and died in Neuilly-sur-Seine, Hauts-de-Seine. He studied at the École polytechnique (graduating in 1938) and at the École nationale supérieure de l'aéronautique (graduating in 1943). From 1944 he worked for the French National Society for the Development of Aircraft Engines (Société nationale d'études et de construction de moteurs d'aviation).

In 1955 he founded the company Bertin & Cie, whose most famous activity was the development of the Aérotrain. In 1965 he founded the Société d'Étude et de Développement des Aéroglisseurs Marins (SEDAM) as a subsidiary for hovercraft. Bertin died of a brain tumour just over a year and a half after the French government terminated the contract for a planned Aérotrain line between Cergy and La Défense in Greater Paris.
