= Houses of Montlhéry and Le Puiset =

The Houses of Montlhéry and Le Puiset (referred to as the Montlhéry Clan by Riley-Smith) is the name given by two powerful families, joined in marriage, that played a major role in the 11th and 12th centuries in both the Crusades as well as the administration of the Holy Land. The Montlhéry branch consists of the relatives (descendants and in-laws) of Guy I of Montlhéry (referred to here as simply Guy) and Hodierna of Gometz. The Le Puiset branch consists of the descendants of Everard I of Breteuil. Everard’s son Hugh I of Le Puiset (or simply Hugh) married Guy’s daughter Alice, bringing the families together. Prominent members of the families are as follows.

== Knights who Took the Cross (First Crusade unless otherwise noted) ==
- Milo I of Montlhéry (d. 1102), son of Guy
- Guy III Trousseau (d. 1109), son of the previous
- Guy I of Dampierre (d. 1151), grandson of Milo I
- Guy II of Dampierre (d. 1216), grandson of the previous (Third Crusade)
- Hugh II Bardoul of Broyes (d. before 1121), son-in-law of Milo I
- Hugh III of Broyes (d. 1199), grandson of the previous (Second Crusade)
- Guy II the Red of Rochefort (d. 1108), son of Guy
- Hugh I of Rethel (d. 1108), son-in-law of Guy
- Guitier of Rethel (d. 1171), grandson of the previous
- Walter of Saint-Valéry (d. after 1098), son-in-law of Guy
- Bernard II of Saint-Valéry (d. unknown), son of the previous
- Eudon of Saint-Valéry (d. unknown), brother of the previous
- Éverard III (d. 1099), son of Hugh and grandson of Guy
- Hugh III of Le Puiset (d. 1132), son of the previous
- Ralph the Red of Pont-Echanfray (d. 1120 in the White Ship disaster), grandson-in-law of Hugh
- Guy of Puiset (d. 1127), son of Hugh
- Walo II of Chaumont-en-Vexin (d. 1098), son-in-law of Hugh
- Drogo de Chaumont (d. 1099), son of the previous
- Waleran of Le Puiset (d. 1126), son of Hugh
- Joscelin IV of Lèves (d. unknown), son-in-law of Hugh and father-in-law of Ralph the Red
- Héribrand III of Hierges, son-in-law of Hugh I of Rethel.

== Kings of Jerusalem ==
- Baldwin II (d. 1131), son of Hugh I of Rethel
- Melisende, Queen of Jerusalem (d. 1153), daughter of the previous
- Subsequent kings.

== Princes of Galilee ==
- William I of Bures (d. 1142), son of Hugh of Crécy, and grandson of Guy
- William II of Bures (d. 1158), brother of the previous.

== Counts of Edessa ==
- Joscelin I (d. 1131), grandson of Guy
- Joscelin II (d. 1159), son of the previous.

== Counts of Jaffa ==
- Hugh I of Jaffa (d. between 1112 and 1118), son of Hugh
- Hugh II of Jaffa (d. 1134), son of the previous.

== Others ==
- Gilduin of Le Puiset (d. 1135), Abbot of St. Mary of the Valley of Jehoshaphat, son of Hugh
- Cecilia of Le Bourcq, Lady of Tarsus, sister of King Baldwin II
- Manasses of Hierges, Constable of Jerusalem, grandson of Hugh I of Rethel
- Renaud of Montlhéry, Bishop of Troyes, son of Milo I
- Guy of Dampierre, Bishop of Chalon, son of Guy I of Dampierre
- Hugh de Puiset, Bishop of Durham (d. 1195), son of Hugh III of Le Puiset
- Hugh of Crécy (d. 1147), seneschal, son of Guy II the Red of Rochefort.

== Related Houses ==
- House of Dampierre (Guy I of Dampierre)
- House of Courtenay (Joscelin I, Lord of Courtenay, son-in-law of Guy)
- House of Dammartin (Drogo de Chaumont)
- House of Châteaudun (descendants of Melisende and her husband Fulk the Younger, King of Jerusalem).

The family trees of the Montlhéry and Le Puiset houses can be found in Riley-Smith.

== Sources ==
- Riley-Smith, Johathan, The First Crusaders, 1095-1131, Cambridge University Press, London, 1997
- La Monte, John L.,The Lords of Le Puiset on the Crusades, Speculum, 1942
- Runciman, Steven, A History of the Crusades, Volume I: The First Crusade and the Foundation of the Kingdom of Jerusalem, Cambridge University Press, London, 1951
- Riley-Smith, Jonathan, The Atlas of the Crusades, Facts On File, New York, 1990, pg 14
