= Crusade of 1101 =

Crusade

- Part of the Crusades
- A map of western Anatolia, showing the routes taken by Christian armies
Date	Summer of 1101
Location	Anatolia
Result	Muslim victory

Belligerents
Kingdom of France; Duchy of Burgundy; County of Blois; County of Nevers; County of Vermandois; Duchy of Aquitaine; Montlhéry; Holy Roman Empire; Palatine County of Burgundy; Duchy of Bavaria; Margraviate of Austria; County of Roussillon; Republic of Genoa; Eastern Roman Empire; Papal States	Seljuk Empire; Seljuk Sultanate of Rum; Danishmends; Seljuk Emirate of Aleppo

Commanders and leaders
Anselm IV of Milan †: Stephen of Blois †; Stephen of Burgundy; Eudes of Burgundy; Constable Conrad; Girard I of Roussillon; Raymond IV of Toulouse; General Tzitas; William II of Nevers; William IX of Aquitaine; Hugh of Vermandois †; Welf of Bavaria; Ida of Austria †	Kilij Arslan I Gazi Gümüshtigin; Fakhr al-Mulk Ridwan

Casualties and losses
High	Relatively low

The Crusade of 1101, also known as the Crusade of the Faint-Hearted, was launched in the aftermath of the First Crusade with calls for reinforcements from the newly established Kingdom of Jerusalem and to rescue the famous Bohemond of Taranto from Muslim captivity. Pope Paschal II, successor to Urban II (who died before learning of the outcome of the crusade that he had called), urged a new expedition. He especially urged those who had taken the crusade vow but had never departed and those who had turned back while on the march. The crusade was a resounding defeat of the West by the Seljuk Turks.

== Cause of Crusade ==
=== Dagobert's Arrival ===
The First Crusade was over and many of the Crusaders who participated returned to Europe. They had just taken over the Holy City of Jerusalem and had defeated the Fatimid counterattack at the Battle of Ascalon. Leaders Robert Curthose of Normandy, Robert II of Flanders and Raymond IV of Toulouse left Godfrey of Bouillon, King of Jerusalem to defend the city with only 300 men.

Following the return of all these Crusaders, who shared their heroic adventures, stories, and exploits of the journey, many more Europeans wanted to take the pilgrimage to the Holy Land. One of these people was the Archbishop of Pisa, Dagobert of Pisa, who saw opportunity in the Levant. He realized the need to expand Pisa's influence east, a move already done by the Republic of Venice and Genoa. So he was made legate by Pope Paschal II, which was a pretext to set off for the Levant with a fleet of 120 ships which, on their way, made successful raids on Byzantine owned islands of Cephalonia and Corfu. After hearing about this news, Eastern Roman Emperor Alexios I Komnenos dispatched the Byzantine navy which skirmished with the Pisans who, after few skirmishes, left for the Outremer.

Despite his conflict with Alexios, Dagobert of Pisa reached the Levant in the September of 1099. One of the Crusader leaders, the Prince of Antioch, Bohemond of Taranto, was besieging the port of Laodicea,which was held by the Byzantines, and Dagobert and the Pisans agreed to help by blockading the port from the sea. However, Robert of Normandy, Robert of Flanders, and Raymond of Toulouse, arrived at Laodicea with the intention of using it as a port to sail back to Europe but were outraged to see Bohemond attacking the port. They saw the necessity for cooperation with the Byzantine Emperor and eastern Christians and they were still bound to their oath to Alexios, which they took when they left from Constantinople to Jerusalem in the Crusade. The Crusader leaders were able to persuade Dagobert to call off the blockade. Bohemond was forced to abandon the siege, and accompanied Dagobert to Jerusalem with a group of pilgrims from Antioch in order to fulfill his crusader oath. Bohemond had quickly become a supporter of Dagobert as both wanted to see the power of the King of Jerusalem decrease in the favor of their own, papal power for Dagobert and Antiochene power for Bohemond.

While the two Roberts left Laodicea for Northern France, Raymond took over the city of Laodicea which was held by Bohemond, and garrisoned it with loyal crusaders. He stayed back in the Levant in order to guard his new territorial gains before leaving for Constantinople in the May of 1100 in order to form an alliance with the Byzantine Emperor Alexios I Komnenos, one of Bohemond's worst enemies, for help against Bohemond and in carving out his own kingdom around the Arab-controlled Levantine city of Tripoli.

Meanwhile, Baldwin I of Edessa was busy consolidating his new County of Edessa. As he was doing so, he heard the news of Jerusalem's fall and his brother, Godfrey of Bouillon's crowning as King of Jerusalem. Hearing this, Baldwin decided to complete his pilgrimage and left Edessa for Jerusalem in November. On his way he joined Bohemond and Dagobert and the group of pilgrims at Buluniyas. Although they faced attacks by Muslims, fatigue, and diseases, which all caused heavy casualties during the journey, most of the pilgrims reached Jerusalem on 21 December.

As all these events were unfolding, Godfrey of Bouillon, King of Jerusalem, was busy expanding the borders of his kingdom. His campaigns would culminate in the First Siege of Arsuf. Previously, Godfrey had signed a treaty with the city where Arsuf would pay him tribute while both sides would exchange each other's hostages. However, the Muslim hostages escaped so Arsuf broke their treaty with Jerusalem, leading to Godfrey besieging the city on the October of 1099. Godfrey began the siege by spending six weeks to build stone throwers which would support two siege towers. Unfortunately for Godfrey, he was severely limited in numbers as the majority of his men left for Europe via Laodicea with the two Roberts. The Fatimid defenders of the city eventually capitulated, offering the surrender to Raymond IV of Toulouse as he had previously been able to restrain his Crusaders from looting cities he conquered. Insulted, Godfrey refused their offer and continued the siege. Hearing of this state of affairs from Laodicea, Raymond supported and encouraged the Fatimid defenders to hold out against Godfrey, citing his so-called weakness. Raymond's efforts came to vain as after the two Crusader assaults made on Arsuf were defeated, the garrison set the siege towers on fire, forcing Godfrey to end the siege. Although the siege was a defeat for Godfrey, by the end of 1100, Godfrey of Bouillon, the King of Jerusalem, had managed to make the Levantine cities of Acre, Jaffa, Caesarea Maritima, Ascalon, and Arsuf tributaries.

Immediately after Christmas, the Latin Patriarch of Jerusalem, Arnulf of Chocques, was deposed on the ground that his election had been uncanonical, and with Bohemond's support, Dagobert was elected in his place. Public opinion had always held that the Holy Land should be the patrimony of the church, but Arnulf had been too weak to establish supremacy. Dagobert's position was stronger, as he was papal legate and had the support of the Pisan fleet. Immediately after his enthronement, Godfrey of Bouillon knelt before him and was invested with the territory of Jerusalem, and Bohemond did the same for Antioch. The new patriarch confirmed Godfrey and Bohemond in the possession of their lands, but no similar ceremony was recorded in connection with Baldwin, Count of Edessa, who did not give homage to him due to tense relations. This connection with Pisa now meant that the Crusaders had a line of communication with Western Europe and now did not need to rely on Eastern Roman supply shipments. Baldwin and Bohemond left Jerusalem on 1 January 1100. Duqaq, the Seljuk ruler of Damascus, sent forces to attack them, but the crusaders routed the Seljuk troops near Baalbek. Baldwin arrived back in Edessa in February.

=== Bohemond's Capture ===
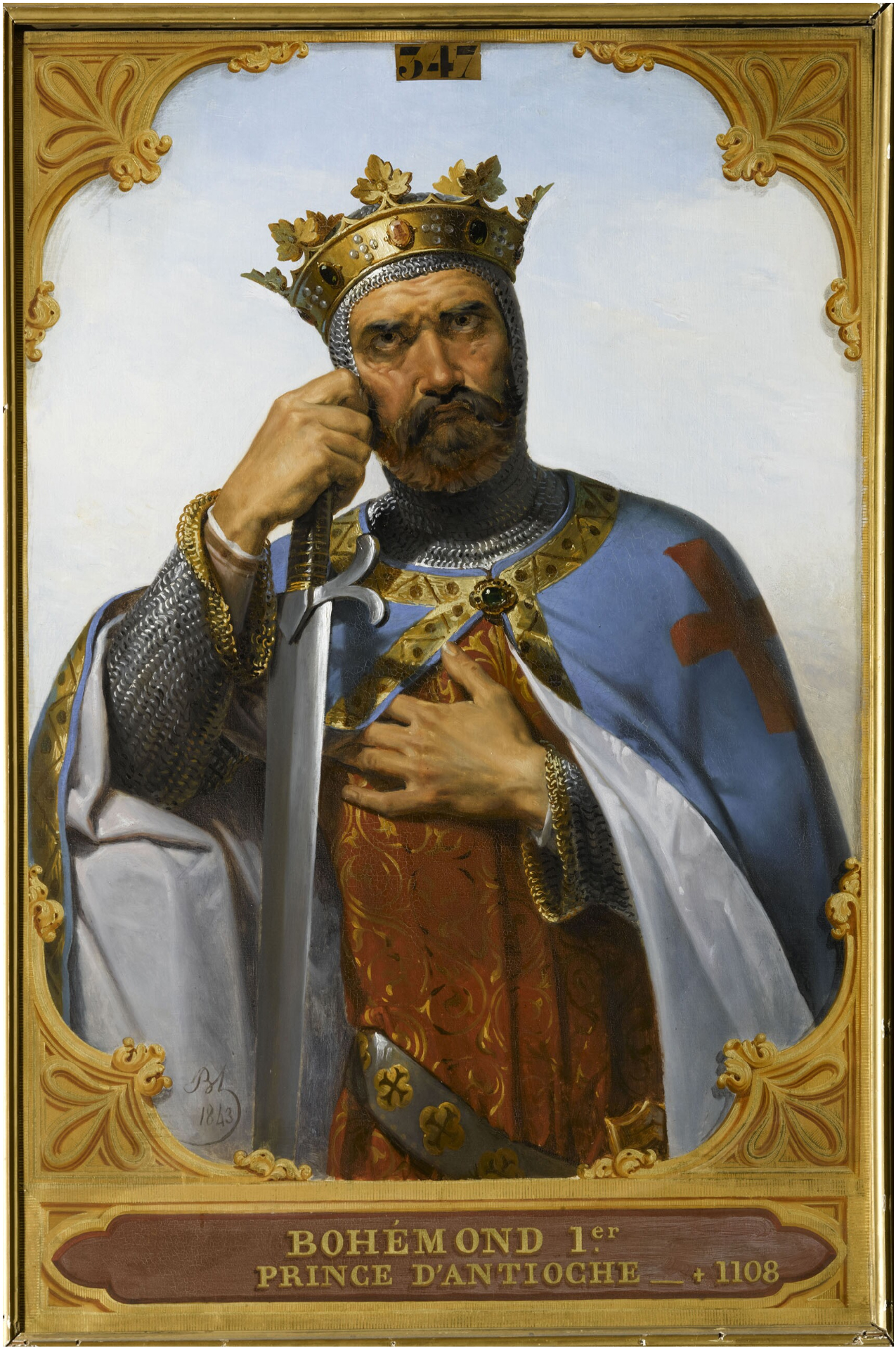
Bohemond I of Antioch

In the May of the year 1100, the Armenian warlord Gabriel of Melitene took the city of Melitene from the Anatolian Turkic Beylik of the Danishmendids. When he received reports that the Danishmendid Bey Gazi Gümüshtigin of Sebastea was preparing an expedition to recapture Melitene he sought help from Bohemond and even offered his daughter, Morphia, in marriage.

Before the First Crusade, Alexios I Komnenos, the Eastern Roman Emperor, had made Bohemond of Taranto promise to give all land he conquered east of Antioch back to him, citing the prior possession of those lands by Constantinople before they were taken over by Turks. However, after the Crusaders took Antioch from the Seljuk Empire, Bohemond took the city for himself, founding the Principality of Antioch with himself as its prince, thus breaking his oath to Alexios. Hostilities began between the two powers, starting another war between the Normans of Southern Italy and Antioch and Constantinople that would end at Bohemond's disastrous crusade of Dyrrhachium.

One of the first actions of the war was when, like mentioned before, he besieged the port of Laodicea which was held by the Byzantines. Then, at around the same time as Bohemond received the cry of help from the Armenians of Melitene, Alexios pressured Bohemond to fulfill his oath and to surrender Antioch to him. Bohemond obviously refused to surrender his powerbase so the Byzantine navy took the important Cilician ports of Seleucia Trachea and Corycos from him. In response, Bohemond replaced the Greek patriarch of Antioch, John the Oxite, with the Latin Peter of Narbonne. Alexios, by taking over lands around Antioch, was squeezing Bohemond's powerbase into extinction, forcing the prince to expand his base by helping the Armenians in Melitene.

Bohemond amassed his army and ventured out to Melitene to fight the Danishmendids. But at the Battle of Melitene in the August of 1100, the Danishmendids under Gazi Gümüshtigin ambushed the expedition, having "most of the Crusaders were killed." Bohemond was captured along with Richard of Salerno while the Armenian bishops of Marash and Antioch were killed. Bohemond's followers who were captured in the battle were killed while Bohemond and Richard of Salerno were imprisoned at Neocaesarea, modern-day Niksar. The Byzantine emperor Alexios I Komnenos offered Gümüshtigin 260,000 bezants for Bohemond so that he could imprison him in Constantinople, but the offer fell flat because the Seljuk sultan of Rum Kilij Arslan I was denied a share, starting a conflict between the Danishmendids and the Seljuks of Rum.

=== Coronation of Baldwin I ===
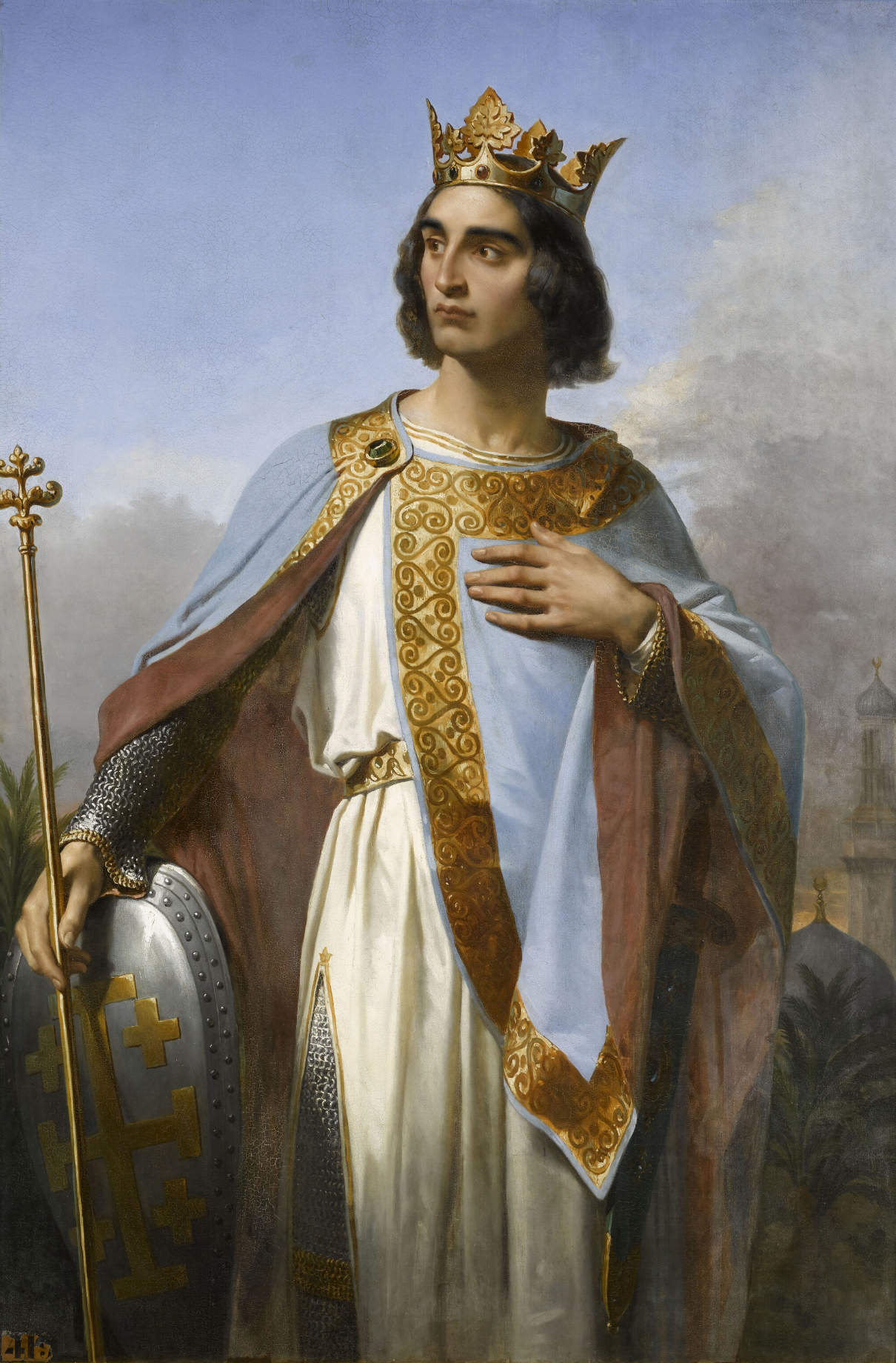
An 1844 portrait of Baldwin I of Jerusalem by Merry-Joseph Blondel

After Dagobert's arrival to Jerusalem, a Venetian expedition to the Crusader States would arrive in 1100 in order to help the Crusaders consolidate their control of the Levant. After defeating a part of the Pisan fleet off Rhodes and then stealing the relics of Saint Nicholas from the Byzantine Greek Orthodox bishop of Myra in Lycia, the Venetians had continued east to the Levant. Off Cyprus they encountered Raymond IV, Count of Toulouse, who was sailing to Constantinople to meet with Emperor Alexios I. From there they reached Jaffa by 24 June with a fleet of 200 ships led by Enrico Contarini. Godfrey made a deal with the Venetians to help conquer coastal cities in exchange for a third of all booty captured (in the case of Tripoli, half of the booty), a Venetian trading quarter in any city captured, an exemption from taxes on commerce and from right of shipwreck for all Venetian shipping. As part of this agreement, the Venetians assisted in the Siege of Haifa.

Joining the Venetians in Jaffa was Dagobert of Pisa. He was anxious to establish his power as Patriarch of Jerusalem and demanded Godfrey for power over the city. Dagobert envisaged turning Jerusalem into a fiefdom of the pope, and according to William of Tyre, he forced Godfrey to concede Jerusalem and Jaffa to him. Dagobert's schemes, however, came to naught. Along with him was Tancred of Galilee, the nephew of Dagobert’s ally, Bohemond, and who was also a supporter of Dagobert’s schemes. While they all planned a campaign to take Haifa, news came that changed everything.

After visiting Caesarea in June 1100, Albert of Aix and Ekkehard of Aura suggest that Godfrey had fallen ill and after being ill for a month and a half, he died in Jerusalem on 18 July 1100. Being at Jaffa at the time of Godfrey's death, Dagobert and Tancred could do nothing to stop Warner of Grez, Godfrey's most influential retainer, from immediately taking possession of the Tower of David in Jerusalem while other Godfrey loyalists took other towers in order to prevent him from entering and annexing the Holy City for the Papal States. Although Warner soon died, two other members of Godfrey’s faction, Geldemar Carpenel and Arnulf of Chocques, sent a delegation to Godfrey's brother, Baldwin I of Edessa, urging him to come to Jerusalem and become king.

To prevent Baldwin from seizing Godfrey's realm, Dagobert and Tancred sought assistance from Bohemond I of Antioch, stating that Baldwin's rule would "bring about the downfall of the church and the destruction of Christianity itself." In order to increase his powerbase, Dagobert continued his campaign against Haifa. Arriving at the city on 25 July, they directed an assault onto the city citadel with a large siege tower and seven mangonels which they built. The city was held by the Fatimid Caliphate and they were helped the city’s large Jewish population, who were afraid of the Crusaders who held antisemitic beliefs. The defenders bravely repelled each Crusader assault using boiling oils and burning straws, eventually holding out for 15 days. When Tancred ordered more assaults on the towers with greater intensity, the defenders were able to hold out a few more days until they finally fell on 20 August. The Crusaders and Venetians, upon entering the city, began violently sacking the city, massacring all civilians, killing anyone they met. The massacre of Haifa effectively destroyed the Jewish community in the city. With all the loot, the Venetians sailed back home. The events at Haifa proved to be just one example of the cruel treatment Muslims and Jews suffered under Crusader rule, a testament to the brutality of the Middle Ages.

When the cry for help was sent to Bohemond, he had already been captured by the Danishmend Gazi Gümüshtigin in the hills near Melitene, which had happened on the 15 August. Gabriel of Melitene, who had previously asked Bohemond for help, now sent a cry of help to Baldwin, who came and relieved the siege of Melitene. Then Baldwin, upon hearing of Bohemond’s capture, pursued the Danishmendids for three days, but he was unable to rescue Bohemond. After Baldwin’s return to Melitene, Gabriel swore fealty to him and he appointed fifty knights to defend the town.

News of Godfrey's death reached Edessa shortly after Baldwin's return from Melitene. His chaplain, Fulcher of Chartres, noticed that Baldwin "grieved somewhat over the death of his brother, but rejoiced more over his inheritance". To finance his journey to Jerusalem, Baldwin seized gold and silver from his subjects. He appointed his relative, the commander of Antioch’s militia Baldwin of Le Bourcq, to be his successor in the county and Le Bourcq swore fealty to him.

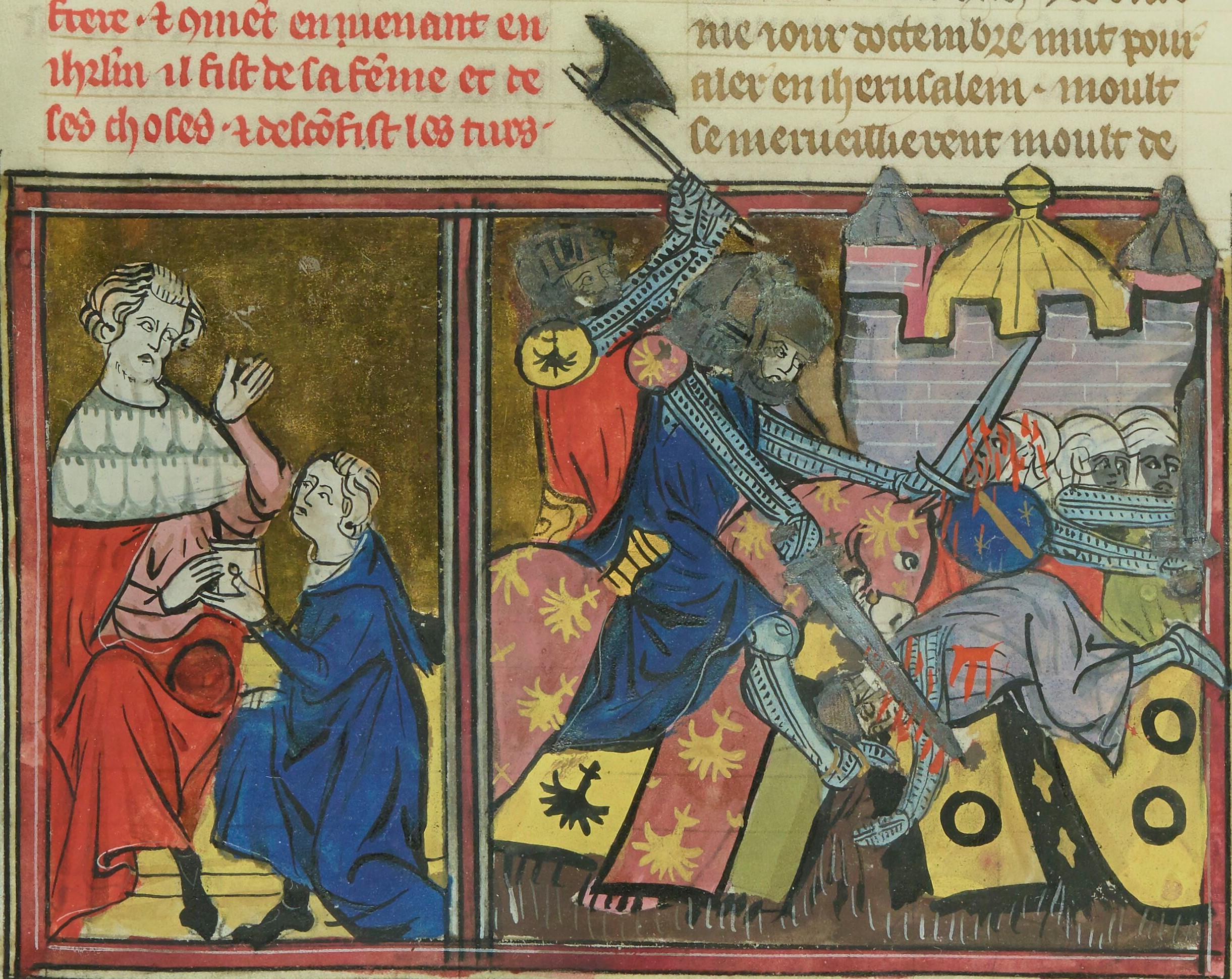
Battle of Nahr al-Kalb

Baldwin left Edessa on 2 October 1100 with about 200 knights and 300–700 foot-soldiers. After spending some four days in Antioch, where he had to reject the plea of the Antiochenes to act as regent to the principality during Bohemond's captivity. After Baldwin left Antioch, he was faced with an ambush led by Shams al-Muluk Duqaq of Damascus, who planned to ambush him on the narrow road near the mouth of the Nahr al-Kalb River and the sea. Fortunately for Baldwin, he was secretly warned by the qadi of Tripoli which enabled him to defeat the attack by luring the Turks off the high ground in a feigned retreat before successfully staging a heavy cavalry charge which routed them. As Baldwin was journeying to Jerusalem, Tancred attempted to secure the city for Baldwin by trying to persuade the garrison to surrender the town to him, but he was barred from the town.

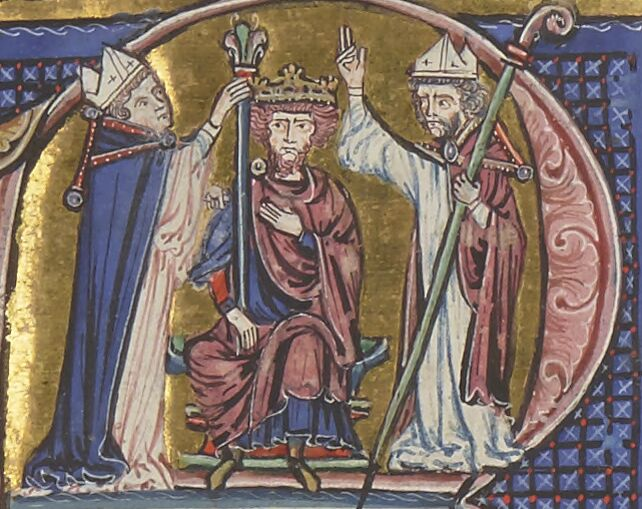
Coronation of Baldwin I of Jerusalem

Baldwin reached Jerusalem around 9 November. Dagobert withdrew to a monastery on Mount Zion as the townspeople stopped Baldwin outside the walls and ceremoniously accompanied him to the Holy Sepulchre. According to Albert of Aix, Baldwin humbly adopted the title of prince. After the ceremonies, Baldwin raided the environs of Ascalon, which was still held by the Egyptians, before launching an attack against the bandits of the caves near Jerusalem. Then he made an incursion across the River Jordan before returning to Jerusalem on 21 December. Baldwin reconciled with Dagobert who agreed to coronate him from prince to king in the Church of the Nativity in Bethlehem on Christmas Day. Only now did Baldwin adopt the title of king as he now had the approval of the patriarch.

Now the only person who opposed Baldwin’s rule was Tancred, Prince of Galilee, who did not recognize Baldwin as king. Baldwin found an excuse to summon Tancred when Geldemar Carpenel laid claim to Haifa, which was part of Tancred's Principality of Galilee, claiming that Tancred had arbitrarily seized it. However, when Tancred arrived at Jerusalem, he once more refused to recognize him as the lawful King of Jerusalem. When they met again at a river near Jaffa, their meeting again did not result in any form of agreement. However, Tancred was forced to leave for Antioch as regent when Baldwin of Bourcq, commander of the city’s garrison, left to rule Edessa. When noblemen had come from the principality to persuade him to assume the administration of the principality on behalf of Bohemond I of Antioch, Tancred was forced to leave and surrendered Galilee in March 1101 to Baldwin I on the condition that the king should grant the same land "as a fief" to him if he returned to the kingdom within fifteen months. Baldwin gave Haifa to Geldemar and the Galilee to Hugh of Fauquembergues.

== Franco-Lombard Expedition ==
Lombard-Tuscan man-at-arms from c. 1100, Vita Mathildis.

In the west, the pope started calling a crusade for the rescue of Bohemond from the Danishmendids at Neocaesarea and to reinforce the Kingdom of Jerusalem. Pope Paschal II purposely targeted the places in Europe who previously did not send many crusaders in the First Crusade. His call led to many people from many different nations or ethnicities joining either to save Bohemond of Taranto, whose heroic actions during the First Crusade had made himself a hero to many Europeans, or to repair their reputations after deserting the First Crusade, or to just go on pilgrimage to Jerusalem. The expedition of 1101 consisted mainly of poorly disciplined, lowly people, women, children and only a few well-trained soldiers, making the event another People’s Crusade. Among them was Hugh, Count of Vermandois, who was the prince of France. After he had left his fellow Crusaders at the Siege of Antioch, he was scorned for not having had fulfilled his vow as a Crusader to complete a pilgrimage to Jerusalem, and Pope Paschal II threatened to excommunicate him. Along with Hugh came Count Stephen of Blois, who had also fled from the Siege of Antioch. His wife, Countess Adela of Blois pleaded with him to make a second pilgrimage, and he joined the subsequent Crusade of 1101 in the company of others who had also returned home prematurely.

By far the largest contingent that was sent was from the region of Lombardy. The Lombards were led by the archbishop of Milan, Anselm IV, a man who was personally selected by Pope Paschal II to lead the upcoming crusade. Anselm preached the crusade throughout Lombardy, where there had been little enthusiasm for the first one, but where his influence sparked a wave of zeal: crowds greeted him chanting "Ultreja! Ultreja!" meaning “Let’s move forward!” The goal of saving Bohemond meant a lot to the Italians, while he was treated as a hero throughout Europe, in Italy he might as well have been treated as a god. Many Italians who had participated in the disastrous People’s Crusade had put themselves under the command of the only Italian leader of the later Prince’s Crusade, Bohemond, who soon became the most popular crusading leader among Italians. On 15 July 1100, Anselm celebrated the anniversary of the Fall of Jerusalem in Milan. He appointed one Grosolanus, then Bishop of Savona, to act as his vicar and, on 13 September, with bishops Guy of Tortona, William of Pavia, and Aldo of Piacenza, and with princes like Milo I of Montlhéry, Guy II of Rochefort, he left with a company reported at the exaggerated figure of 50,000 men, led by Albert of Biandrate, and his nephew Otto Altaspata. Albert, Count of Parma, the brother of Antipope Guibert, was also there as a representative of the resolution of the church-state conflicts which enveloped Lombardy in the final decades of the eleventh century. Their group was at least 10,000 strong with many knights.

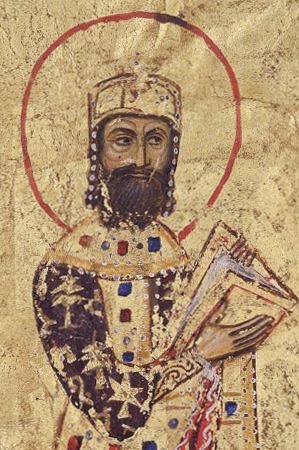
Alexios I Komnenos, Byzantine Emperor

The army proceeded by land first through the Italo-Alpine region of Carnia and through Carinthia with the permission of its duke, Henry V of Carinthia, and then went through the Sava valley in Hungary before entering Byzantine territory through Belgrade. From here the Byzantine Greeks provided them with privileged markets and supplies due to Anselm's negotiations with Alexios I Komnenos, the Eastern Roman emperor. Due to the large number of crusaders, Anselm had the army split into three groups, the first near Philippopolis, the next near Adrianople, and the final one near Rodosto. This act enabled the crusader army to pass through Thrace towards Constantinople much faster. However, each group soon became restless and began to engage in plunder and abuse, even stealing from Orthodox churches. When the Crusaders reached the capital, Alexios I Komnenos escorted them to a camp outside the Walls of Constantinople. However, the camp did not satisfy the Italian crusaders and they made their way into the city where they pillaged the Blachernae palace, even killing Alexios' pet lion. Alexios had enough and ferried the Italians across the Bosporus where they made their camp at Nicomedia where they would wait for reinforcements.

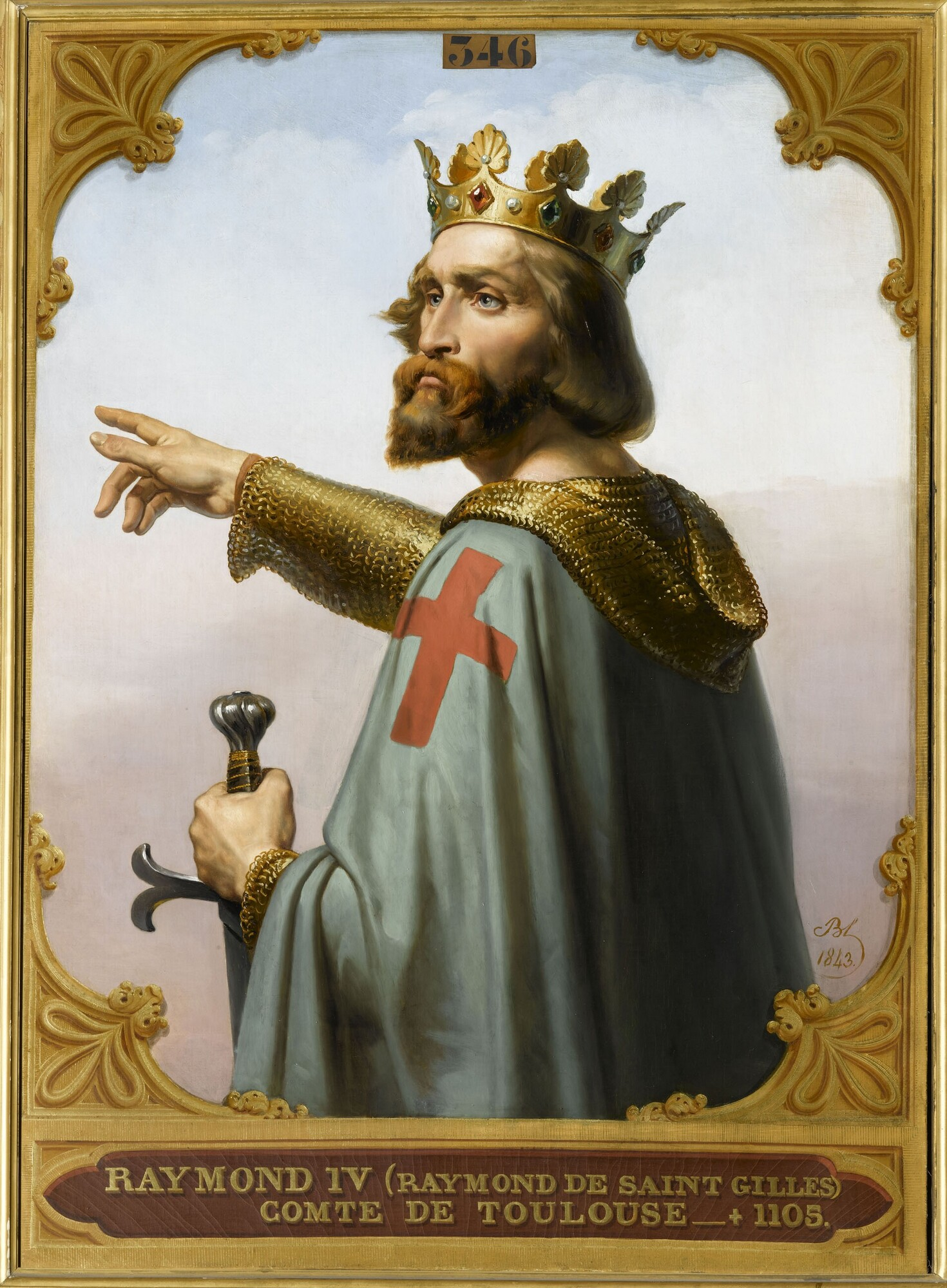
1843 Portrait of Raymond IV of Toulouse, Count of Toulouse, Duke of Narbonne, Margrave of Provence, and later Count of Tripoli by Merry-Joseph Blondel

At Nicomedia, Anselm met Raymond IV of Toulouse, one of the leaders of the Crusade who had orchestrated the capture of Jerusalem. During the First Crusade, Raymond had tried to carve out a domain for himself in the Levant like the other leaders but had, so far miserably failed in taking Antioch, Jerusalem, and Ascalon. The enmity between Raymond and Bohemond had started in the first place because of Raymond’s ambitions, and a brief conflict had even erupted between Bohemond and Raymond over the city which he lost, letting Bohemond of Taranto create the Principality of Antioch for himself. So far, Raymond’s only land in Asia was Laodicea, which, as mentioned before, he took from Bohemond. In order for him to increase his Middle Eastern powerbase, Raymond went to Constantinople, pledging his allegiance to Alexios, seeking help in increasing his Levantine holdings and also to create an alliance against Bohemond. Raymond was ordered under the instructions of Alexios to lead Anselm’s forces through Anatolia. Along with his contingent of loyal Crusaders, Raymond also had the support of a contingent of 500 Pechenegs under General Tzitas, given by Alexios to help him and the Crusaders in the journey. Raymond and his group of Crusaders had already successfully gone through Seljuk Anatolia once before in the First Crusade so it made sense for them to lead a new set of Crusaders through the region again.

While waiting at Nicomedia, Anselm's army got more reinforcements including French, Germans, and Burgundians. This 8,000 strong army was led by Stephen of Blois and included Count Stephen I of Burgundy, Duke Odo I of Burgundy, Joscelin of Courtenay, Baldwin of Grandpré, Dodo of Clermont-en-Argonne, Engelrand of Coucy the Bishop of Laon, Hugh of Die the Archbishop of Lyons, Hugh II Bardoul of Broyes, Viscount Odo Arpin of Bourges, and Conrad the constable of Emperor Henry IV. Many of these Crusaders sold all their possessions to provision themselves with equipment, horses, fodder, and money for the journey, betting everything they had on this mission. These Crusaders were delighted to see that Raymond, a fellow Frenchman, would be coming with them. After several discussions, Raymond, to the reluctance of the Italians, was named leader of the expedition.

Immediately after Raymond and Anselm met, disagreements between the two began. Raymond wanted to lead the Crusaders through the route he had gone upon during the First Crusade and reinforce the Kingdom of Jerusalem, a route that went through Byzantine lands and through the major city of Iconium. However, Anselm and the Italian Crusaders wanted to go on a route directly towards Neocaesarea to rescue Bohemond from the Danishmendids, a dangerous route that led them through the heart of Turkish Anatolia, controlled by their enemy, the Sultanate of Rum. Bohemond, as mentioned before, was a hero in Italy and many of them went on Crusade in order to save him. The Crusader army ended up going on this route. Although they did not realize it yet, that would be the fatal mistake that would lead to the end of their expedition.

Guided by Raymond, the Crusader army marched through Anatolia. The army first went towards Dorylaeum, following the route taken by Raymond and Stephen in 1097 during the First Crusade. However, due to the protests of the Lombards, the army turned east towards the Turkish interior where they captured the Seljuk controlled city of Ancyra in Galatia on 23 June 1101 and returned it to Alexios. As they moved deeper into Anatolia, they were being continually watched by Seljuk spies sent by the Seljuk Sultan of Rum Kilij Arslan I. Arslan wanted revenge against the Crusaders after they captured his previous capital of Nicaea and defeated his army at the Battle of Dorylaeum as they reconquered Western and Southern Anatolia for Constantinople. Since his defeat at the Battle of Dorylaeum in 1097, Kilij Arslan had been creating an anti-Crusader coalition with the purpose of ending more Crusader invasions of Seljuk Anatolia. Arslan's coalition included his Seljuk Sultanate of Rum, the Danishmendid Emirate of Sebastea, and the Emir of Aleppo, Fakhr al-Mulk Ridwan. Arslan knew the land well and would not underestimate the Crusaders like he had done during the First Crusade. As the Crusaders headed north for Gangra, Arslan employed the scorched earth tactic or as he destroyed the land, burned as much food and supplies he could not carry, poisoned as many wells and cisterns as he could, emptied all villages or towns the Crusaders were heading towards as he had Seljuks attack Crusader foraging parties and supply lines. The Crusaders briefly unsuccessfully besieged the heavily garrisoned city of Gangra in Paphlagonia. However, Turkish reinforcements delayed the Crusaders all the way to July, during which the Crusaders suffered from oppressive heat. Raymond suggested for the Crusaders to continue north to attempt to capture the Turkish-controlled city of Kastamone. He probably did this in an attempt to get more in favor with Alexios whose Komnenos family originated from there. Desperate to move to a cooler climate, the Crusaders followed Raymond’s advice and moved towards the city and from there to the Black Sea coast. It was on the march to Kastamone that the Seljuk harassment got worse. They constantly attacked foraging parties and isolated Crusader groups, forcing the Crusaders to starve to death. Whenever some knights tried to pursue attacking Turks, they would find themselves as victims of the feigned retreat and get killed. By the time the Crusaders reached and took Kastamone, they were starving and thirsty due to the constant Turkish attacks.

Raymond and the Franco-Germans knew that it was best for them to head up to the Black Sea coast and enter Byzantine controlled Paphlagonia and Pontus so that they could resupply and regroup safe from the attacking Seljuks. However due to the stubbornness of the Lombards who were ever so-desperate to save Bohemond, Raymond ended up leading the Crusaders again through the hostile Seljuk Anatolia towards Neocaesarea. As July died, the Crusaders, lacking food and water, suffered immensely from the excruciating heat, especially with the heavy equipment many had to hold. When they crossed the Halys River, they entered Danishmendid territory where they carried out a "senseless" sack of a village inhabited by Greek Christians, as Anna Comnena testifies. In August, the Crusaders encamped halfway between the Halys and Neocaesarea, near the village of Mersivan.

=== Battle of Mersivan ===
As the Crusaders were marching towards Mersivan they were organized into five divisions, the Lombards and Italians in the front led by Anselm IV who was followed by Raymond IV of Toulouse with Pecheneg cavalry. After Raymond were the Burgundians led by Count Stephen I of Burgundy and Duke Odo I of Burgundy. Behind the Burgundians came the Germans led by the German constable Conrad followed by the French led by Stephen of Blois. The army moved sluggishly as all the soldiers, camp followers, and horses were all weak. Due to the massive size of the army, communication between each of the contingents was slow, making the march discoordinated. As the army marched towards Mersivan, they had found themselves surrounded by a Seljuk army led by Kilij Arslan I himself who quickly surrounded the Crusaders in order to block off any routes of escape. In reaction to the Turks, the Crusaders created a camp inside the encirclement and filled it with the camp followers while the soldiers deployed themselves around the perimeter of the camp with the intention of protecting it. During the first of these, which fell on a Friday, the Turkish archers positioned themselves on the various flanks of the camp; from there, while emitting "ferocious shouts", they unleashed intense volleys of arrows, then hastily retreated to make room for other groups who, from a different position, repeated the same tactic. However, the Crusaders defended valiantly, fending off attack over attack over attack while staying in formation, despite the problem of language barriers between the multinational force.

On the next day, the German constable, Conrad unsuccessfully led a group of German crusaders in an attempt to break the Seljuk lines. Not only did he fail, but he was cut off by the Turks from the Crusader lines. The Turks moved in to destroy the isolated German group, killing many, but Conrad and the remaining Germans were able take refuge in a nearby castle. As the rest of the Crusaders awaited Conrad’s return, many of them feared that he had abandoned them like how Hugh and Stephen had done in the First Crusade.

On the third day, a Sunday, nothing eventful happened. The next day, Anselm preached to the Crusaders with the Holy Lance from the Siege of Antioch and with a relic of Saint Ambrose before the Italian crusaders attempted to break through the Seljuk lines from the east. Although they inflicted many Turkish casualties, they suffered many casualties as well, forcing them to withdraw. On the fifth day of the battle, Kilij Arslan was joined by some Danishmendid princes and the Turkmen Emir of Aleppo, Fakhr al-Mulk Ridwan. Along with them came many Syrian Turkmen and Danishmendid troops. With their army augmented, the Turks launched an attack, annihilating the tired and demoralized Crusaders. The attack routed Lombards, with Albert of Biandrate fleeing with many Italian knights, abandoning their camp followers. The Italian infantry tried to follow suit but they were no match for the swift Turkish horses and were attacked one by one by them. Meanwhile the Pechenegs abandoned the fight. At this point of the battle, the Turks were attacking the Crusaders from all sides and were entering the camp as the French and German crusaders were forced to fall back. In the chaos, Raymond was trapped underneath a rock and was rescued by the Stephens of Burgundy and Blois. Conrad, managed to rejoin the battle from his castle with his Germans but the course of battle was unchanged, more and more Crusaders fell and the remaining Crusaders lost more and more cohesion as chaos spread. The battle continued into the next day, when the Crusader camp was captured and the knights fled, leaving women, children, and priests behind to be killed or enslaved. The Crusaders who did not possess many horses, mostly the Lombards, were not able to retreat that far from the Turks, and were hunted like wild game. Those who managed to escape were mainly the knights and nobles who had horses. After the battle, most of the old men and women and children were all killed. Those camp followers and warriors who did not die, but got captured, were sent into slavery. Among the more than 50,000 casualties was Odo I of Burgundy, who was killed in battle. The Holy Lance found by Peter Bartholomew during the Siege of Antioch was also captured by Kilij Arslan.. After the Battle of Mersivan, the Franco-Lombard expedition of Raymond of Toulouse, Anselm of Milan, and Stephen of Blois was basically destroyed.

One of the Crusaders who managed to escape the calamity was Raymond IV of Toulouse. He, with a small escort including Stephen of Blois and Stephen of Burgundy, managed to reach the small Byzantine-Paphlagonian port of Bafra, a city at the mouth of the Halys River, where they managed to get on a small ship to Constantinople. Other knights who managed to escape went to Sinope, from where they were also able to sail to Constantinople. Anselm IV of Milan was able to escape to Constantinople to nurse his injuries where he would soon die. Much of the Crusaders blamed the failure of the Crusade on Alexios and the Byzantines. In reality, Alexios was furious at the Crusade's failure. Although he received Raymond and his companions with courtesy, he was very cold and did not hide his disappointment at all.

== Niverais Expedition ==
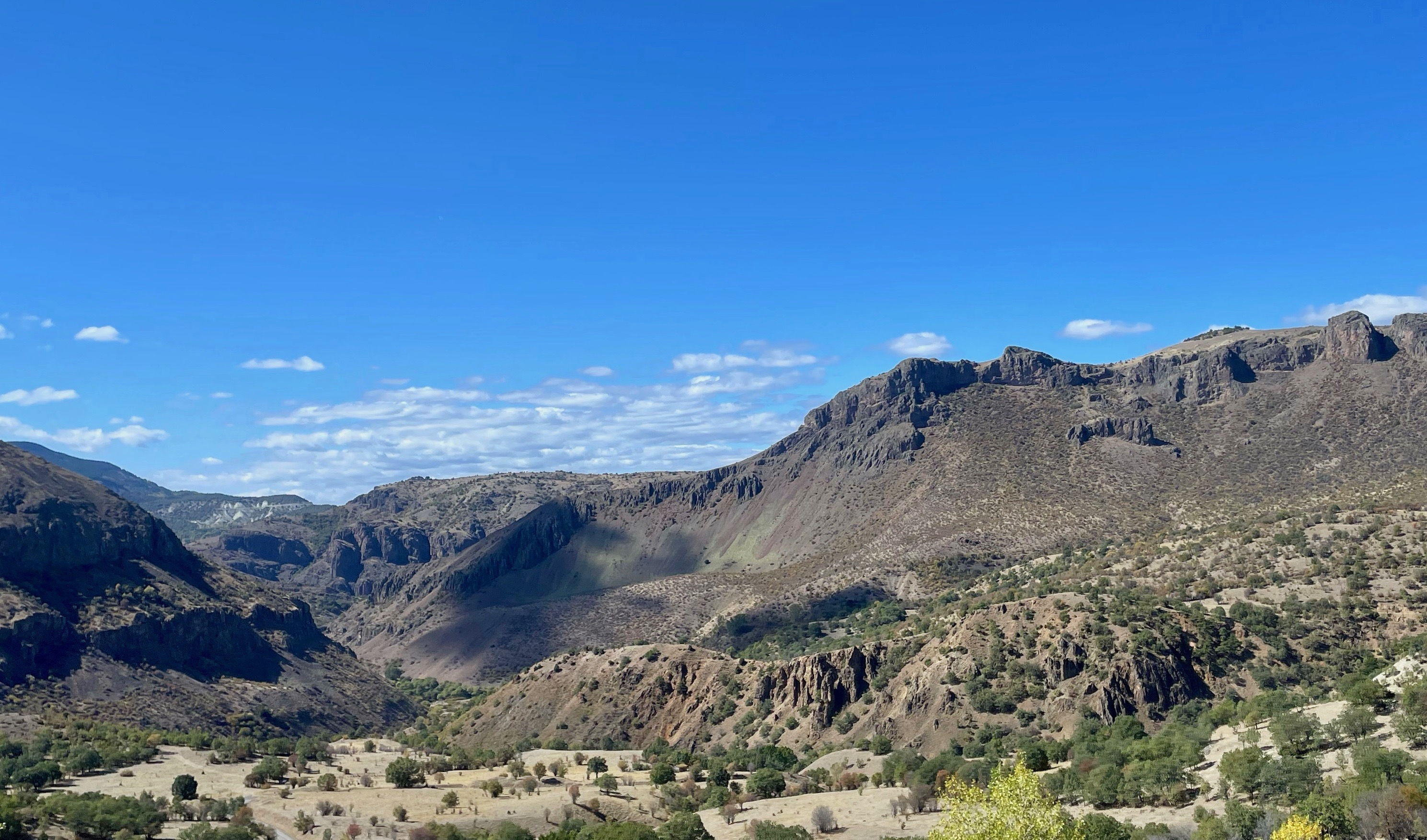
The barren landscape in Central Anatolia that the Niverais and Franco-Bavarian expeditions had to go through when marching to Heraclea Cybistra.

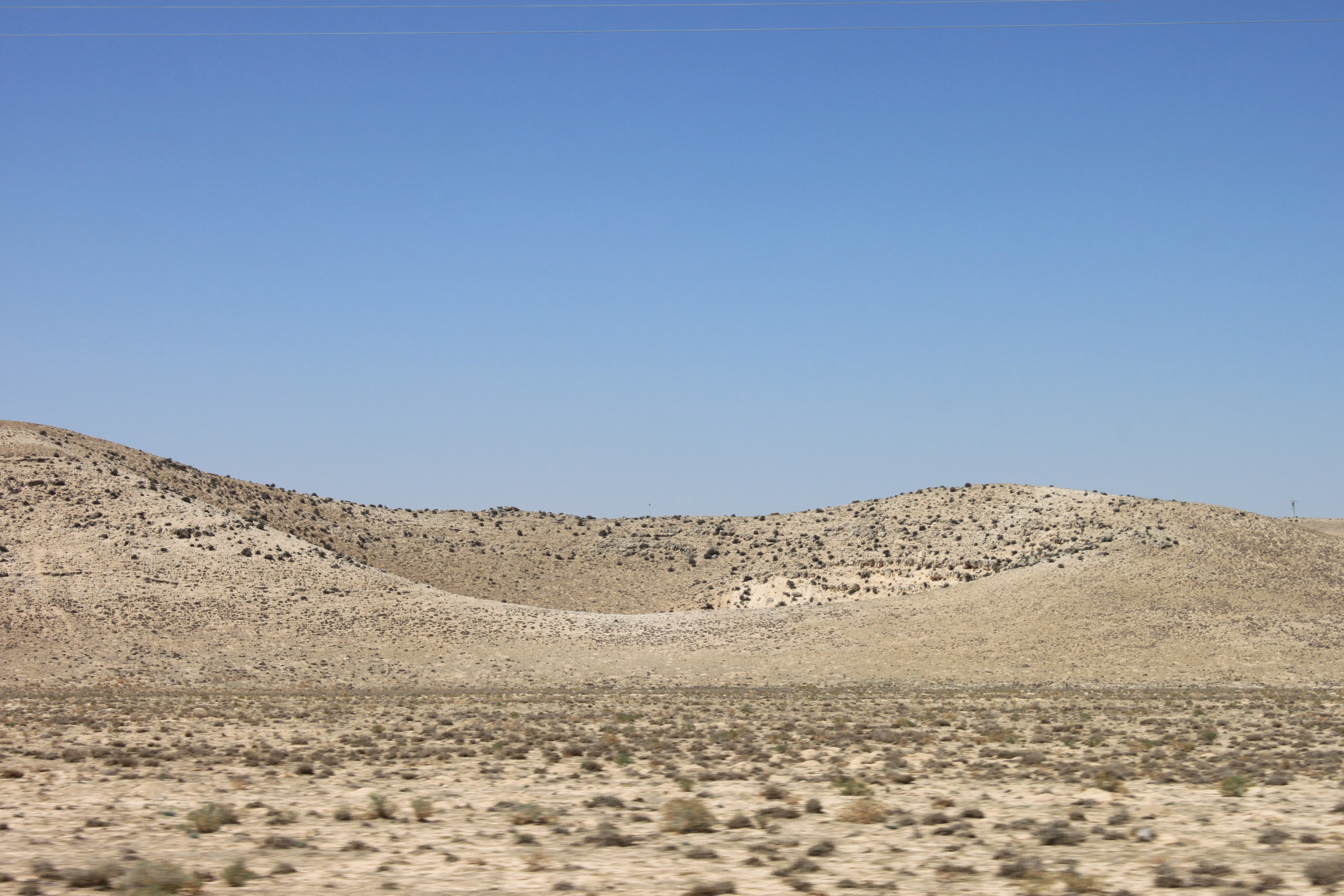
The barren landscape in Central Anatolia that the Niverais and Franco-Bavarian expeditions had to go through when marching to Heraclea Cybistra.

Just as the Franco-Lombard contingent had left Nicomedia, a separate force under Count William II of Nevers arrived at Constantinople. The force mainly consisted of soldiers from the County of Nevers, also known as Nivernais. The 15,000 strong Nivernais force under William II had crossed into the Byzantine-Epirote city of Valona over the Adriatic Sea from Brindisi. From Valona, the Niverais marched through Macedonia and then Thrace before arriving at Constantinople without incident, an unusual occurrence for a crusader army. After being received cordially by the Eastern Roman Emperor Alexios I Komnenos, he soon reached Nicomedia. William was eager to move fast as he wanted to join his Burgundian allies in the Franco-Lombard expedition. From there William II of Nevers learned that he was soon going to be joined by another Crusader army that mainly consisted of French and Bavarians.

For these reasons, William, upon hearing that the Franco-Lombards were in Ancyra, raced towards the city. However when he arrived, he had lost the trail of the Franco-Lombard expedition so he went south towards Iconium on the route the First Crusaders took when they were going through Anatolia, in order to complete his pilgrimage and reinforce the Kingdom of Jerusalem. When he arrived in mid-August, William attempted to besiege the city but gave up after three days when he was unable to take it due to the large Seljuk garrison. William’s journey had gone mostly uninterrupted as Kilij Arslan I’s coalition was distracted by the much larger Franco-Lombard expedition at Mersivan.

Unfortunately for the Niverais, by the time they had left Iconium for the next major Byzantine city, Heraclea Cybistra (Ereğli, Konya), the Turks had finally defeated the French and the Lombards and now moved their focus onto the destruction of the Niverais. The Turks enacted their scorched earth tactics by burning and stealing all food supplies while blocking and poisoning wells while he also kept up his constant attacks on the Crusader army. The Turks were also helped by the geography of the region. The Crusaders had to contend the extremely hot and dry summer while they also had to go through the unforgiving Central Anatolian steppe which was devoid of food and supplies while it was the perfect terrain for the swift Seljuk horses in their surprise attacks. Before long, the Niverais were exhausted and weakened from their long journey, and right in front of Heraclea they were ambushed by the Turks led by Kilij Arslan himself. Kilij Arslan had simply placed his Turks in hidden positions around the road to Heraclea and rushed and surrounded the Crusaders when they arrived. The Crusaders were so tired and so terrified by the Turks that they put little to no resistance that they lost the battle. The men on horseback, like William, were just able to escape, while all the infantry and camp followers were either killed or captured and sold into slavery.

After spending a few days crossing the Taurus Mountains, the survivors managed to enter Cilicia. They took refuge in the Byzantine forts of Germanicopolis and Seleucia Isauria. According to Albert of Aachen, the local Byzantine governor offered to provide William and his companions with an escort of twelve Pechenegs to accompany them to the Levant. But a few weeks later, Count William II of Nevers and his companions reached Antioch, claiming that the Pechenegs had robbed them and abandoned their journey.

== Franco-Bavarian Expedition ==
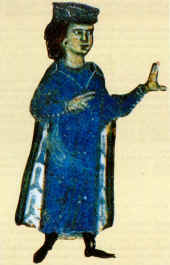
William IX of Aquitaine

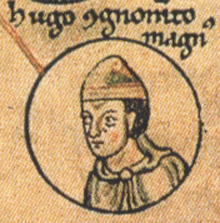
Hugh I of Vermandois

As William and the Niverais were leaving Nicomedia, a new crusading army had begun to trickle into the city. The force mainly consisted of French and Bavarian crusaders. One leader of the French contingent was William IX of Aquitaine, a famous Occitan troubadour and was an enemy of Raymond IV of Toulouse as his wife, Philippa of Toulouse, was the daughter of Raymond's elder brother, William IV of Toulouse and thus had a claim to the throne of Toulouse, Narbonne, and Provence. Some people in his army included Geoffrey Burel of Amboise, Geoffrey II of Vendôme, and Hugh VI of Lusignan. Another leader of the French contingent was Hugh of Vermandois. Hugh had participated in the successful First Crusade when he was sent to Constantinople after the Siege of Antioch to ask Alexios I Komnenos for reinforcements. After his unsuccessful attempt, he left for France instead of rejoining the Crusaders. After threats of excommunication by Pope Paschal II due to his cowardly acts, he took the cross again for crusade.

The 16,000 strong force went through Southern Germany where they met Welf I of Bavaria, who they managed to persuade to join the Crusade. The French were thus joined by a large German contingent of primarily Bavarians which included the papal legate and Bishop of Salzburg, Thiemo, and the widowed margravine Ida of Austria, mother of Leopold III of Austria. The Crusaders from Germany, marched through the Kingdom of Hungary from where they crossed the Danube to Belgrade in the Byzantine Empire. As they marched through the Balkans, they acted the complete opposite of the Niverais. The Franco-Bavarians misbehaved so badly that Alexios had to send in Pechenegs and Cumans to protect locals and to police the Crusaders. A battle ensued between the two forces only stopped by the intervention of Welf.

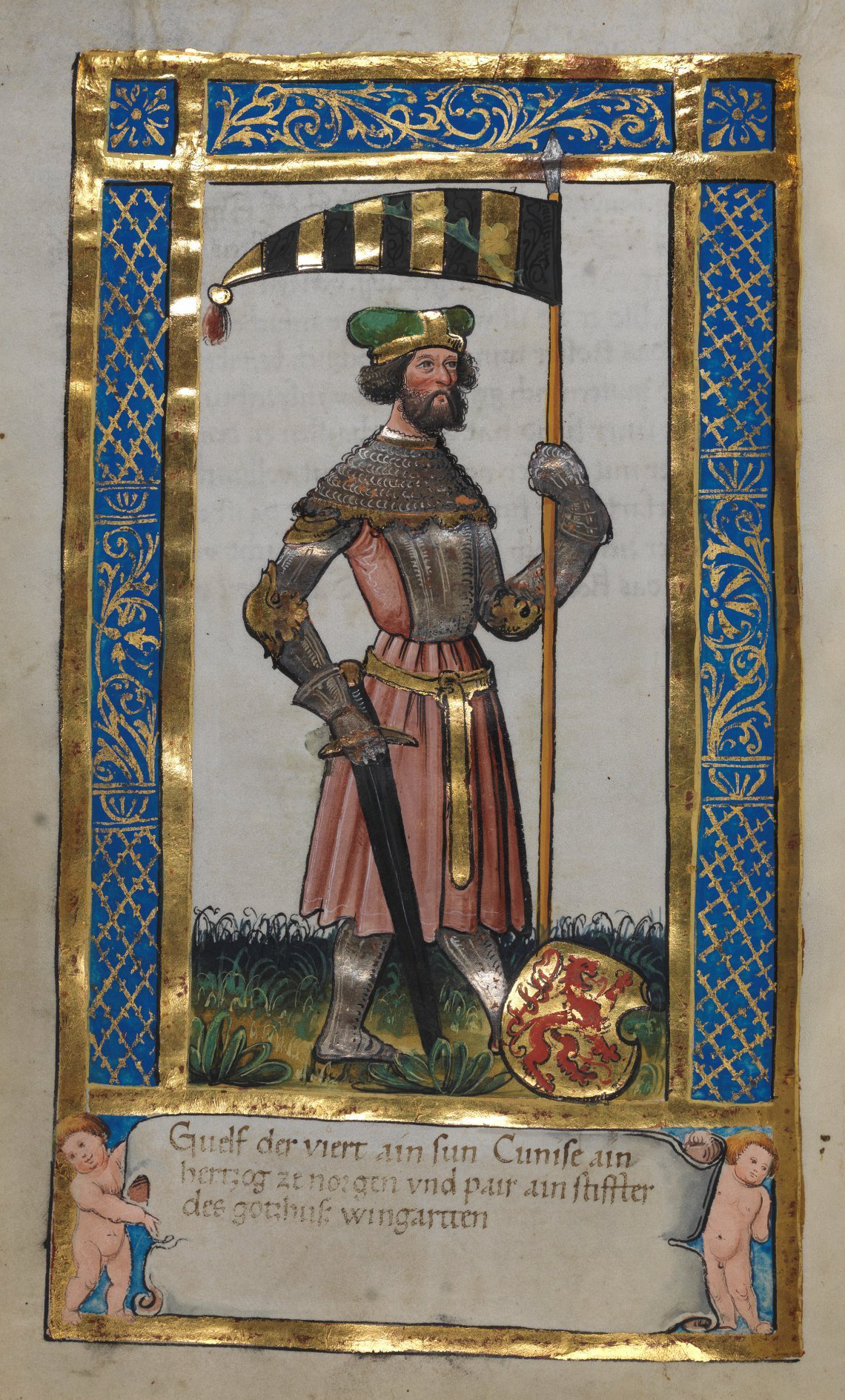
Welf I of Bavaria

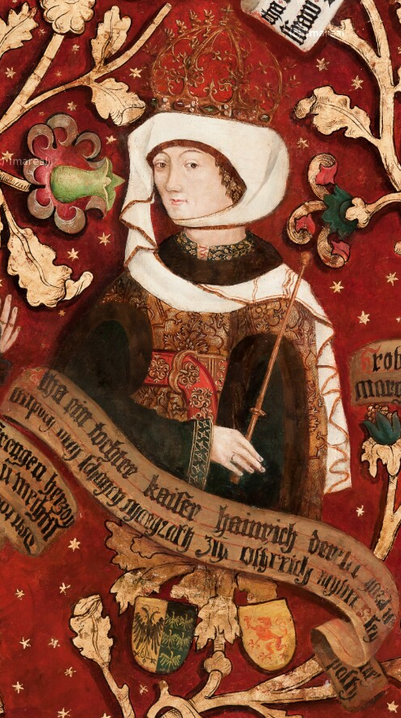
Ida of Formbach-Ratelnberg

Unlike William of Nevers, who had attempted to link up with the Franco-Lombards, William of Aquitaine’s rivalry with Raymond of Toulouse and Welf of Bavaria’s rivalry with the Holy Roman Empire and thus Constable Conrad, stopped any chance of the Franco-Bavarians from linking up with the Franco-Lombards. This led to the force waiting for five weeks at Nicomedia, leading many pilgrims to sell their horses in order to opt for the sea voyage from Constantinople to the Levant. When the force finally did set off, they, led by Hugh of Vermandois, went along the route the First Crusade went, which went through Dorylaeum, Iconium, Heraclea Cybistra, and finally to Antioch. Unfortunately for the Crusaders, they were going on the route the Niverais went along. Most of the route had been devastated by the Seljuk scorched earth strategy and whatever supplies were left were used up by the Niverais. Since the Seljuks had dried up the wells, the Crusader had no safe water source as in Anatolia, most streams dry up in the summer. Their situation got much worse much faster than the Niverais, forcing them to sack nearby Philomelion for food and water. Then, when they reached Iconium, they found the city abandoned, with all the city’s food taken with the locals. As they got closer and closer to Heraclea, Seljuk raids on the Crusaders increased, preventing the Crusaders from safely sending out supply parties.

When the Crusaders came nearer to Heraclea, they found a river that had not dried up. The Crusaders, who had not drank fresh water in days, broke ranks and rushed toward the stream in order to drink. However, the Turks, who were nearby, took the opportunity to attack the disorganized mass of Crusaders. The “battle” was more like a massacre. The Turks were easily able to rout the Crusaders as most were too hungry, too thirsty, too weak to even put up a fight. The mass of Westerners were all crowded together that many died from being trampled by other Crusaders. William of Aquitaine managed to flee on his horse to the nearby heights from where he was able to escape to Tarsus. Meanwhile, Hugh of Vermandois was seriously injured in the fighting, and with some of his men, was able to escape to Tarsus where he died on 18 October. Welf was able to escape to Paphos, Cyprus, where he died while Ida’s fate was unknown. Later legends would form that she joined a harem where she would become the mother of Imad al-Din Zengi but chronological discrepancies make this impossible.

== Aftermath ==
William of Nevers also escaped to Tarsus and joined the rest of the survivors there as did Raymond of Toulouse. Under Raymond's command they captured Tortosa (Tartous) with help from a Genoese fleet. The crusade became more of a pilgrimage. The survivors arrived at Antioch at the end of 1101, and at Easter in 1102 arrived in Jerusalem. Afterwards, many of them simply went home, their vow having been fulfilled, although some remained behind to help King Baldwin I defend against an Egyptian invasion at Ramla. Stephen, Count of Blois, father of Stephen, the future King of England, was killed during this battle, as was Hugh VI of Lusignan, ancestor of the future Lusignan dynasty of Jerusalem and Cyprus. Joscelin of Courtenay also stayed behind, and survived to become Count of Edessa in 1118.

The defeat of the Crusaders allowed Kilij Arslan to establish his capital at Iconium and also proved to the Muslim world that the Crusaders were not invincible, as they appeared to be during the First Crusade. The Crusaders and Byzantines each blamed the other for the defeat, and neither of them were able to ensure a safe route through Anatolia since Kilij Arslan had strengthened his position. The only open route to the Holy Land was the sea route, which benefitted the Italian maritime republics. The lack of a safe land route from Constantinople also benefitted the Principality of Antioch, where Tancred, ruling for his uncle Bohemond, was able to consolidate his power without Byzantine interference. Both the Second and Third Crusades suffered similar difficulties when attempting to cross Anatolia.
