= Rochefort =

Rochefort (/ˈroʊʃfɔːrt/) may refer to:

== Places ==
=== France ===
- Rochefort, Charente-Maritime, in the Charente-Maritime department
  - Arsenal de Rochefort, a former naval base and dockyard
- Rochefort, Savoie in the Savoie department
- Rochefort-du-Gard, in the Gard department
- Rochefort-en-Terre, in the Morbihan department
- Rochefort-en-Valdaine, in the Drôme department
- Rochefort-en-Yvelines, in the Yvelines department
- Rochefort-Montagne, in the Puy-de-Dôme department
- Rochefort-Samson, in the Drôme department
- Rochefort-sur-Brévon, in the Côte-d'Or department
- Rochefort-sur-la-Côte, in the Haute-Marne department
- Rochefort-sur-Loire, in the Maine-et-Loire department
- Rochefort-sur-Nenon, in the Jura department

=== Elsewhere ===
- Rochefort, Belgium
- Rochefort, Switzerland
- Aiguille de Rochefort, a mountain in the French-Italian Alps
- Dôme de Rochefort, another mountain in the French-Italian Alps
- Canton of Rochefort

== Other uses ==
- Rochefort (surname)
- Rochefort Abbey, Cistercian abbey in the town of Rochefort, Belgium
  - Rochefort Brewery, Trappist beer brewery located on the site of the abbey
- The Young Girls of Rochefort, a 1967 French musical film written and directed by Jacques Demy
- Raid on Rochefort, a 1757 British military expedition
- 4172 Rochefort, a main-belt asteroid
- Princes of Rochefort, a junior branch of the noble House of Rohan

== See also ==
- Roquefort (disambiguation)
- Rock Fort (disambiguation)
- Rochford (surname)
