= Milo II of Montlhéry =

French noble (died 1118)

Milo II of Montlhéry (died 1118) was lord of Bray and Montlhéry, and viscount of Troyes. He was the son of Milo I the Great and Lithuise, a granddaughter of William the Conqueror and younger brother of Guy III of Montlhéry.

He initially held the lordship of Bray-sur-Seine, in Champagne. In 1105, he attacked his brother's castle of Montlhéry, where his cousin Lucienne de Rochefort, fiancée of Louis VI of France, lived. He invested the castle, but could not succeed in capturing the donjon. Louis VI soon arrived to relieve the siege, and Milo was obliged to retire.

On the death of his brother, both Milo and his cousin Hugh of Crecy asserted their rights to the lordship. Louis VI allotted it to Milo, who in 1113 revolted against him with Thibaut IV of Blois. He married Adela of Blois, daughter of the crusader Stephen, Count of Blois and his widowed countess, Adela of Normandy. (Note: Kimberly A. LoPrete states Milo bigamously married an unnamed daughter of Adela, but the marriage was annulled.) This marriage was the result of a treaty negotiated by countess Adela. Milo was to support Adela against King Louis, and in return, he would marry Adela. Due to this connection, Milo was made viscount of Troyes. However, Milo was still married so the marriage to Adela was annulled. In 1118 Hugh of Crecy took revenge for his loss of Montlhéry by having Milo assassinated; Louis VI then made Montlhéry part of the royal domain of France.

== Sources ==
- Evergates, Theodore (2007). The Aristocracy in the County of Champagne, 1100-1300. University of Pennsylvania Press.
- LoPrete, Kimberly A. (2013). "Adela of Blois as Mother and Countess". In Parsons, John Carmi; Wheeler, Bonnie (eds.). Medieval Mothering. Routledge.
- Suger (1992). The Deeds of Louis the Fat. Translated by Cusimano, Richard; Moorhead, John. Catholic University Press.
