= Hugh II =

Hugh II may refer to:

- Hugh II of Lusignan (c. 910/5–967)
- Hugh II, Count of Maine (920–before 992)
- Hugh Magnus, co-king of France (1007-1025)
- Hugh II, Viscount of Châteaudun (died 1026)
- Hugh II, Count of Ponthieu (died 1052)
- Hugh II, Count of Empúries (c. 1035–1116)
- Hugh II Bardoul, Lord of Broyes (died before 1121)
- Hugh II, Count of Saint-Pol (died 1130)
- Hugh II, Duke of Burgundy (1084–1143)
- Hugh II of Jaffa (c. 1106–1134)
- Hugh II (bishop of Grenoble) (died 1155), also archbishop of Vienne
- Hugh II of Rodez (c. 1135–1208)
- Hugh II of Saint Omer (ca. 1150–1204)
- Hugh II, Count of Rethel (died 1227)
- Hugh II, Count of Angoulême (1221–1250), a.k.a. Hugh XI of Lusignan
- Hugh II of Cyprus (1252/3–1267), ruler, also of Jerusalem
- Hugh II, Count of Blois (died 1307)
- Hugh II of Arborea (died 1336)
- Hugh II of Chalon-Arlay (1334–1388)
