= Armies of Stephen of Blois on the First Crusade and the Crusade of 1101 =

The armies of Count Stephen of Blois participated in both the First Crusade of 1096 and the Crusade of 1101. Stephen apparently fled the battlefield at the Siege of Antioch and returned home. He was coerced by his wife, Adela of Normandy, to form another army to return to the Holy Land in 1101, accompanied by Count Stephen I of Burgundy.

The known members of the army, which numbered in the thousands, include the ones listed below, as reported in histories of the First Crusade and the Crusade of 1101. Unless otherwise noted, references are to the on-line database of Riley-Smith, et al, and the hyperlinks therein provide details including original sources. The names below are also referenced in the Riley-Smith tome, Appendix I: Preliminary List of Crusaders. Those references are not shown unless they appear elsewhere in the text of the afore mentioned book. Articles that are hyperlinked to a more detailed article in this encyclopædia rely on the latter for references.

== First Crusade ==
The members of Stephen's first army are identified from a number of sources. Runciman names the following members of Stephen’s army that participated in the First Crusade:

- Everald of Le Puits (Éverard III of Puiset, Viscount of Chartres)
- Guerin Gueronat (Guernonatus), son of Hugh Guernonatus (see below)
- Richard “Carus Asini” (Caro Asini)
- Geoffrey Guarin
- Alexander, chaplin and vice-legate to Stephen
- Fulcher of Chartres, later chaplin to King Baldwin from 1097 until his death.

According to Riley-Smith, “...the entire ruling class of Chartres took the cross--the vidame and his brother, and the viscount--together with the provost and perhaps two canons of the cathedral, the castellans of Mondoubleau, Fréteval, Gallardon and Beaugency, and the prévôt of Blois...” These individuals included:

- Nivelo of Fréteval
- Guarin of Gallardon
- Hugh I of Gallardon
- Hugh Guernonatus, the Prévôt of Blois, plus his son Guarin

Other members of the army included the following:

- Hugh I of Le Puiset
- Miles of Bray, Viscount of Troyes and Castellan of Bray, son of Milo I of Montlhéry
- Walbert, Castellan of Laon
- Grimoald of Maule
- Guy Pagan of Garlande, seneschal of King Philip I of France, who distinguished himself in the seizing of the Iron Bridge at Antioch
- Odo of Beaugency, Standard-bearer of Stephen, uncle of William II of Nevers
- Ralph of La Fontanelle, who travelled with Éverard III of Puiset
- William Marchisi Filius, nephew of Bohemond of Taranto.

== Crusade of 1101 ==
The army of Stephen supporting the Crusade of 1101 included the following:

- Baldwin of Grandpré
- Odo I of Burgundy
- Dodo of Clermont-en-Argonne
- Engelrand of Coucy, Bishop of Laon
- Guy II the Red of Rochefort and his brother Milo I, Lord of Montlhéry, both part of the Lombard contingent
- Hugh of Burgundy (Hugo III), Archbishop of Besançon, son of William I, Count of Burgundy
- Hugh of Die, Archbishop of Lyons
- Hugh Bardoul (Bardolf) II of Broyes
- Joscelin I of Courtenay, later Count of Edessa.

== Sources ==
- Runciman, Steven, A History of the Crusades, Volume One: The First Crusade and the Foundation of the Kingdom of Jerusalem, Cambridge University Press, London, 1951
- Riley-Smith, Jonathan, The First Crusaders, 1095-1131, Cambridge University Press, London, 1997
- Riley-Smith, Jonathan, The First Crusade and the Idea of Crusading, University of Pennsylvania Press, 1986 (available on Google Books)
- Prof. J. S. C. Riley-Smith, Prof, Jonathan Phillips, Dr. Alan V. Murray, Dr. Guy Perry, Dr. Nicholas Morton, A Database of Crusaders to the Holy Land, 1099-1149 (available on-line)
