= Rochefort (surname) =

Rochefort is a surname.

Notable people with the surname include:

- Ben Rochefort (1896–1981), American baseball player
- Candide Rochefort (1904–1971), Canadian politician
- Charles de Rochefort (1887–1952), French actor
- Christiane Rochefort (1917–1998), French writer
- Damon Rochefort (born 1965), Welsh scriptwriter, songwriter and producer
- Dave Rochefort (born 1946), Canadian ice hockey player
- David Rochefort, American politician
- Edmond Rochefort (1790–1871), French writer
- Ellen Rochefort (born 1954), Canadian runner
- Garnier de Rochefort (died c. 1225), French churchman
- Guillaume de Rochefort (c. 1433–1492), French lawyer
- Henri Rochefort (born 1935), French biochemical doctor
- Jean Rochefort (1930–2017), French actor
- Joseph Irenée Rochefort (1910–1979), Canadian politician
- Joseph Rochefort (1898–1976), American naval officer and cryptanalyst
- Leon Rochefort (born 1939), Canadian ice hockey player
- Line Rochefort, Canadian ecologist
- Lucienne de Rochefort (1088–?), first wife of Louis VI of France
- Lydie de Rochefort-Théobon (1638–1708), French mistress
- Marie Laurence de Rochefort, French socialite, television presenter, and writer
- Nathalie Rochefort, Canadian politician
- Nick Rochefort, American comedian, car salesman, and antique shop owner
- Noël de Rochefort (1889–1916), French military pilot
- Normand Rochefort (born 1961), Canadian hockey player
- Pauline Rochefort (born 1957), Canadian politician
- Pierre Rochefort (born 1981), French actor and singer
- Richard Rochefort (born 1977), Canadian ice hockey player
- Robert Rochefort (born 1955), French politician
- Victor Henri Rochefort, Marquis de Rochefort-Luçay (1831–1913), French politician

Fictional characters:

- Comte de Rochefort, a character in Alexandre Dumas's d'Artagnan romances
- Belze Rochefort, a character in manga/anime Black Cat
- Lili Rochefort, a character in the Tekken fighting game series
