= Roquefort (disambiguation) =

Roquefort is a sheep milk cheese from the south of France.

Roquefort may also refer to:

== Places in France ==
- Roquefort-les-Pins, Alpes-Maritimes
- Roquefort-les-Cascades, Ariège
- Roquefort-de-Sault, Aude
- Roquefort-des-Corbières, Aude
- Roquefort-sur-Soulzon, Aveyron
- Roquefort-la-Bédoule, Bouches-du-Rhône
- Roquefort, Gers
- Roquefort-sur-Garonne, Haute-Garonne
- Roquefort, Landes
- Roquefort, Lot-et-Garonne

== Other uses ==
- Roquefort, a character in The Aristocats
- "Roquefort", a song by Karnivool from Themata

== See also ==
- Rochefort (disambiguation)
- Rockfour, a rock band from Israel
- Rocquefort, Seine-Maritime, France
