= Château de Montlhéry =

Coordinates: 48°38′06″N 2°16′21″E

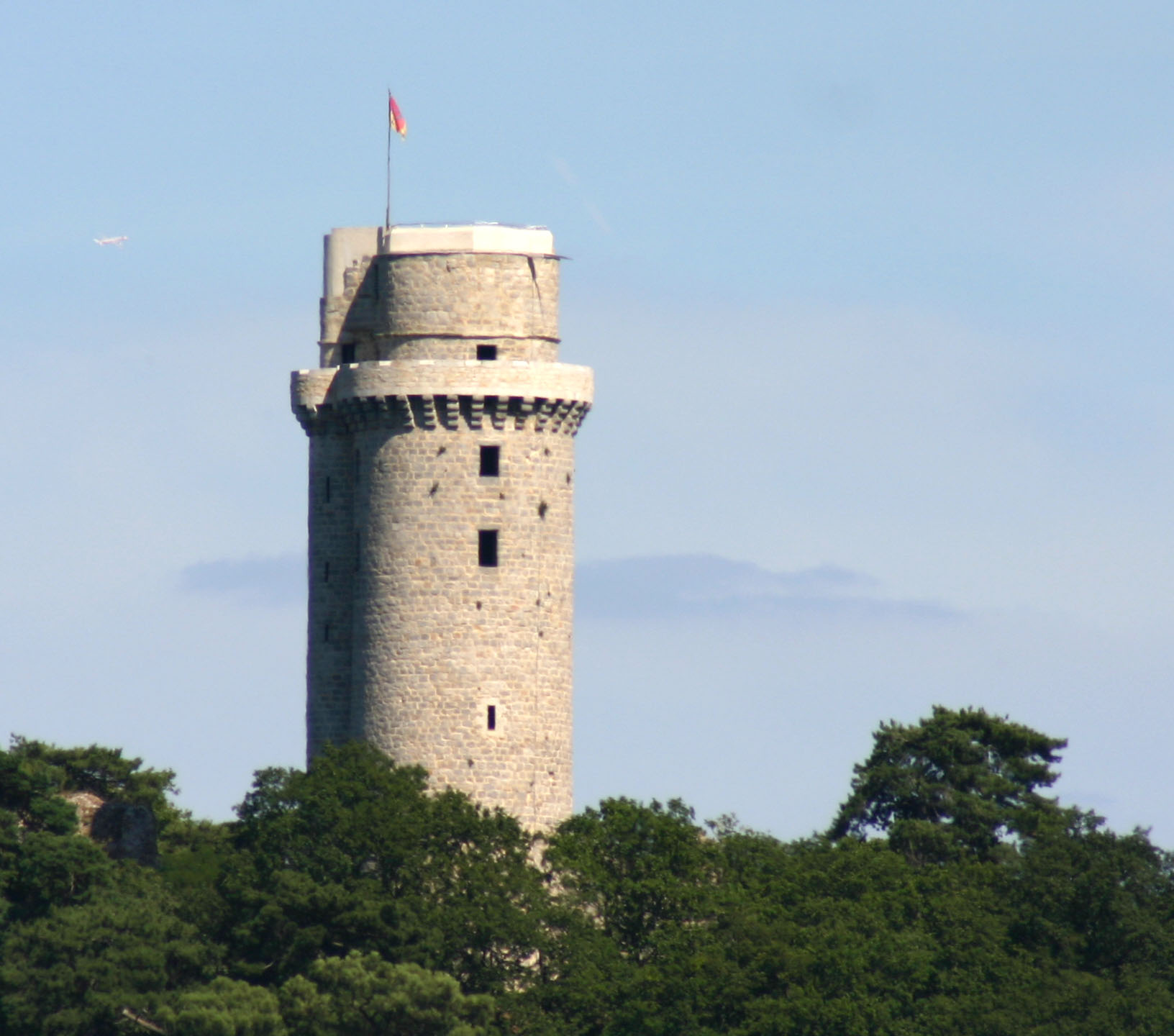
The keep

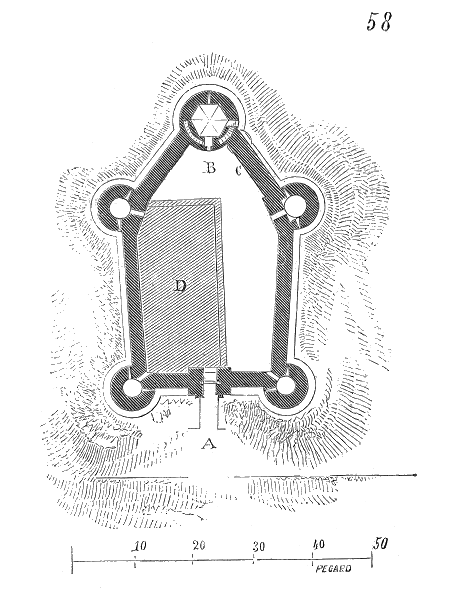
Plan of the present castle

The Château de Montlhéry is a castle in the commune of Montlhéry in the Essonne département of France. Ruins date from various periods, most notably the 10th, 11th, 13th and 14th centuries.

The present 13th-century castle, with its prominent keep, succeeded a castle built in the 11th century, and an earlier foundation, built from 991 to 1015. The castle is a rectilinear pentagonal plan, with five surviving towers, one of which is much larger than the rest and serves as the keep, forming the point of the pentagon, at the end of the ridge. A gate tower protected the entrance on the opposite site. Recent evidence suggests that there may have a second court or bailey extending in front of the present gate, as well as a substantial chapel inside the presumed lower court.

Thanks to its position, the keep was notably connected with the scientific experiments of Pierre Gassendi (measurement of the speed of sound), Claude Chappe (experiments with optical telegraphy in 1794) and Alfred Cornu (measurement of the speed of light in 1874).

Visitors today can see the keep, the well, the moat and the remains of the curtain wall. The castle is state property. It has been listed since 1840 as a monument historique by the French Ministry of Culture.

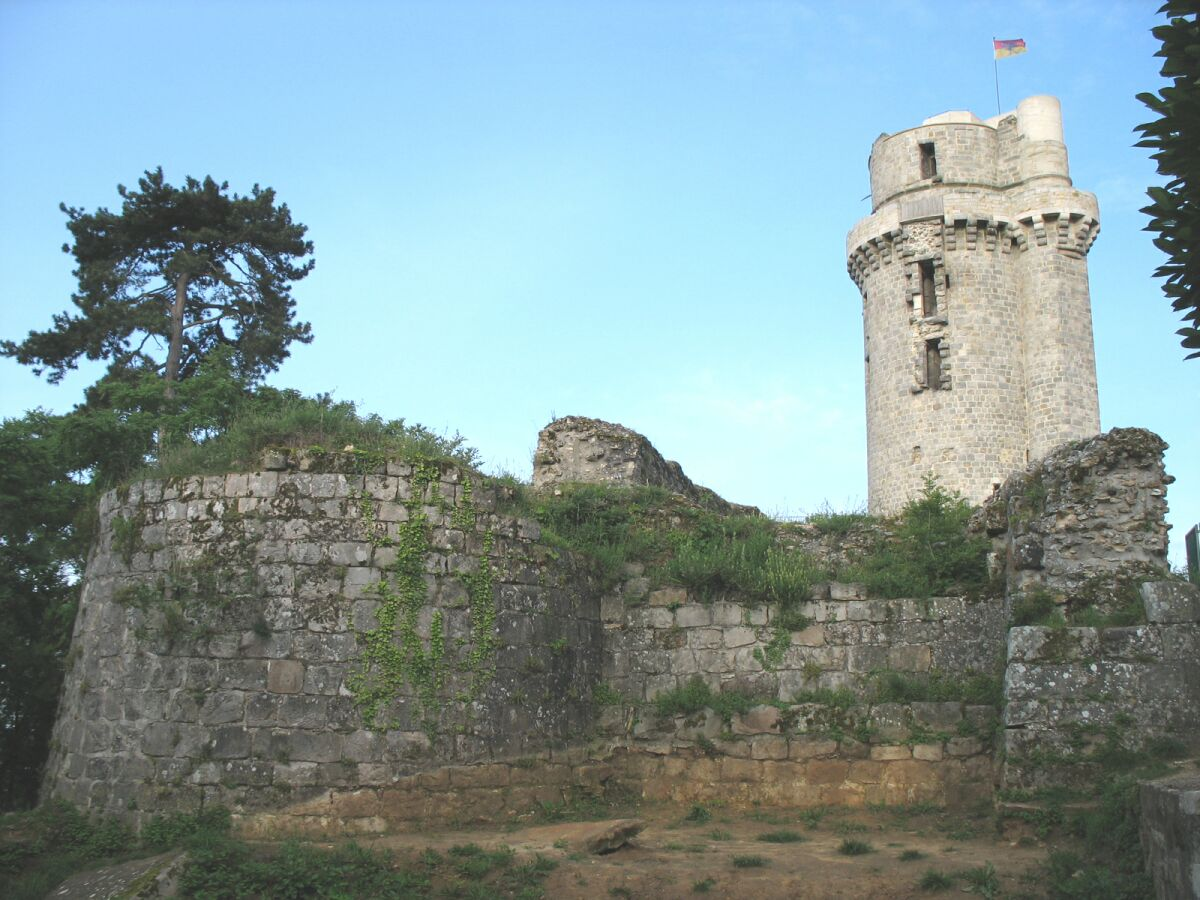
Château de Montlhéry.

== See also ==
- List of castles in France
