= Montlhéry =

Commune in Île-de-France, France

- Commune
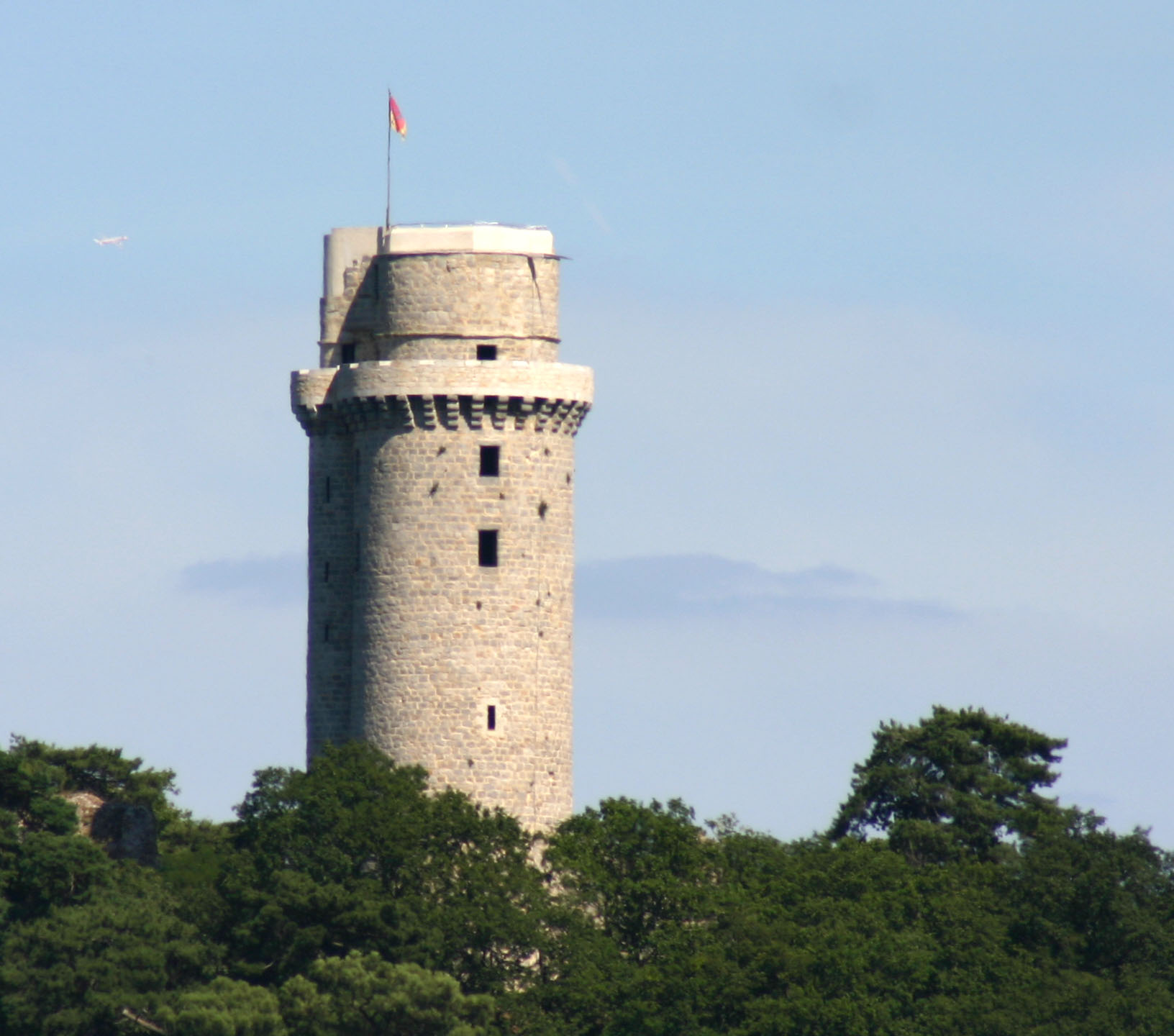
- Tour de Montlhéry

- Coat of arms
- Location of Montlhéry
- Location within France Location within Île-de-France (region)
- Coordinates: 48°38′21″N 2°16′20″E
- Country: France
- Region: Île-de-France
- Department: Essonne
- Arrondissement: Palaiseau
- Canton: Longjumeau
- Intercommunality: CA Paris-Saclay

Government
  - Mayor (2020–2026): Claude Pons
- Area^{1}: 3.28 km^{2} (1.27 sq mi)
- Highest elevation: 151 m (495 ft)
- Lowest elevation: 64 m (210 ft)
- Population (2023): 9,772
  - Density: 2,980/km^{2} (7,720/sq mi)
- Time zone: UTC+01:00 (CET)
  - Summer (DST): UTC+02:00 (CEST)
- INSEE/Postal code: 91425 /91310
- ^{1} French Land Register data, which excludes lakes, ponds, glaciers > 1 km^{2} (0.386 sq mi or 247 acres) and river estuaries.

Montlhéry (French pronunciation: [mɔ̃leʁi]) is a commune in the Essonne department in Île-de-France in northern France. It is located 26 km (16.2 mi) from Paris.

== History ==
Montlhéry lay on the strategically important road from Paris to Orléans. Under the Merovingians, it was owned by the church in Reims and in 768 it was given to the abbey of St. Denis in Paris. It was the site of a number of battles between the lords of Montlhéry and the early Capetian monarchy.

The Montlhéry noble house was related to the Montmorency family; Thibaud, the founder of the Montlhéry dynasty, was the brother of Bouchard II, the progenitor of the Montmorency house. Thibaud ruled from 970 to 1031 and was succeeded by his son Guy I, who ruled until 1095. Guy I's children married into other local noble families: his daughter Melisende married Hugh, count of Rethel, and another daughter Elizabeth married Joscelin of Courtenay. Through these marriages and subsequent Montlhéry participation on the First Crusade, Guy I was the ancestor of the ruling dynasties of the crusader Kingdom of Jerusalem and the County of Edessa. Another daughter, Alice, married into the Le Puiset family, and a son, Guy, became count of Rochefort. Guy I was succeeded by Milo I, followed by Milo's sons Guy II and Milo II. In 1118, after many disputes with the rebellious lords, Louis VI of France ordered the castle to be dismantled and turned the town into a royal residence. Louis VI had himself been married to a granddaughter of Guy I, Lucienne of Rochefort, from 1104 to 1107.

After being absorbed into the royal domain, Montlhéry became part of the territory governed by the viscount of Paris. In the early 13th century, the French king Philip II (Augustus) completely rebuilt the castle in the contemporary style, at a new site high above the town.

During the Hundred Years' War, the town and the castle frequently passed between English and French forces. On 16 July 1465, Charles the Bold defeated Louis XI of France at the Battle of Montlhéry. The town was left in ruins by the Wars of Religion, but it was rebuilt in 1591 under Henry IV.

In the 19th century, the tower was used for scientific experiments. In 1822, François Arago calculated the speed of sound there; a cannonball shot at the tower was observed from the Observatory of Villejuif. In 1823, Claude Chappe installed a relay for the Paris-Bayonne telegraph line. On 5 June 1874, Alfred Cornu tried to calculate the speed of light between the tower and the Observatory in Paris.

During the Franco-Prussian War, the town was occupied and pillaged by the Prussians. It was occupied again by Germany in 1940 during the Second World War.

Today Montlhéry is twinned with Stetten am kalten Markt, Germany.

== Population ==
Inhabitants of Montlhéry are known as Montlhériens in French.

Historical population
Year	Pop.	±% p.a.
1968	3,283	—
1975	3,714	+1.78%
1982	4,359	+2.31%
1990	5,195	+2.22%
1999	5,676	+0.99%
2007	6,455	+1.62%
2012	7,201	+2.21%
2017	7,593	+1.07%
2023	9,772	+4.29%
Source: INSEE

== Château de Montlhéry ==
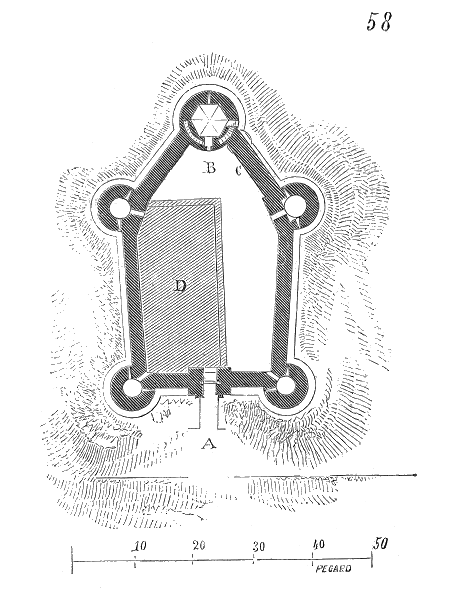
Plan of the present castle

The Château de Montlhéry, a 13th-century castle with its prominent keep, succeeded a castle built in the 11th century, and an earlier foundation, built from 991 to 1015.

=== List of lords of Montlhéry ===
- Thibaud of Montmorency (970-1031)
- Guy I of Montlhéry (1031–1095)
- Milo I of Montlhéry (1095–1102)
- Guy II of Montlhéry (1102–1109)
- Milo II of Montlhéry (1109–1118)
- passes to royal domain of France

== Economy ==
South of Montlhéry (on the communes of Linas and Bruyères-le-Châtel) is the site of an automobile race track, the Autodrome de Montlhéry, established by Alexandre Lamblin in 1924. It is sometimes referred to as the 'French Indianapolis', because it is laid out as a high speed oval. Many speed records were set there within months of its opening. Today the racetrack has fallen into disuse and is also used for other purposes including a variety of automobile meetups.

Montlhéry was also a market town, which is remembered today in the Tomato Festival. The medieval tower is also a popular tourist attraction, which recently re-opened in 2005 after being closed for repairs.

== Personalities ==
- Henri Oreiller, was an alpine ski racer and Olympic gold medallist from France.
- Paul Fort, nicknamed Le Prince des Poètes, lived there from 1921 until his death in 1960.

== See also ==
- Communes of the Essonne department
