= Guy I of Montlhéry =

French noble (died 1095)

Guy I (died 1095) was the second lord of Bray and the second lord of Montlhéry (Latin: Monte Leterico). He was the son of Milo of Montlhéry.

He married Hodierna of Gometz, sister of William, lord of Gometz. They had:

- Milo I the Great, (also called Milon I) lord of Montlhéry, married Lithuaise, Vicomtesse of Troyes
- Melisende of Montlhéry (d. 1097), married Hugh I, Count of Rethel. Mother of Baldwin II of Jerusalem.
- Elizabeth (Isabel) of Montlhéry, married Joscelin, lord of Courtenay. Mother of Joscelin I, Count of Edessa
- Guy II the Red (d. 1108), lord of Rochefort
- Beatrice of Rochefort (1069–1117), married Anseau of Garlande
- Hodierna of Montlhéry, married Walter of Saint-Valery
- Alice of Montlhéry (also called Adele or Alix) (1040–1097), married Hugh I, lord of Le Puiset (1035–1094). Their son was Hugh I of Jaffa and daughter was Humberge of Le Puiset who travelled on the First Crusade with her husband Walo II of Chaumont-en-Vexin. Humberge's cousin (name unknown) was married to Ralph the Red of Pont-Echanfrey who also travelled with her husband on crusade.

Guy died in 1095, the same year Pope Urban II launched the First Crusade. Many of his descendants had illustrious careers in the Holy Land, through the Montlhéry, Courtenay, and Le Puiset branches of his family.

== See also ==
- Houses of Montlhéry and Le Puiset

== Sources ==
- La Monte, John L. (1942). "The Lords of Le Puiset on the Crusades". Speculum.
- LoPrete, Kimberly A. (2007). Adela of Blois: Countess and Lord (c.1067-1137). Four Courts Press.
