= Milo I of Montlhéry =

French nobleman (died 1102)

Milo I the Great (died 1102) was lord of Montlhéry from 1095 until his death. He was the son of Guy I of Montlhéry and Hodierna of Gometz.

The identity of his first wife is unknown. His second wife was Lithuise de Blois, Vicomtesse de Troyes, daughter of William Busac, Count of Soissons (c. 1084–1118).

Milo and Lithuise had at least nine children:

- Guy III Trousseau, lord of Montlhéry
- Thibaut
- Milo II (died 1118), lord of Montlhéry and Bray-sur-Seine, viscount of Troyes
- Adelaide
- Elizabeth (Isabella) of Montlhéry, married Thibaut of Dampierre. Their son was Guy I of Dampierre.
- Emmeline of Montlhéry (died 1121), married Hugh II Bardoul, lord of Broyes
- Renaud of Montlhéry, Bishop of Troyes (1121–1122)
- Marguerite, married Manasses, Viscount of Sens.

Milo joined the Lombard contingent during the second wave of the First Crusade around 1100 together with his brother Guy II. He returned from the crusade "broken by the stress" and "devoid of all bodily strength".

== See also ==
- The Houses of Montlhéry and Le Puiset

== Sources ==
- Aird, William M. (2015). "Many others, whose names I do not know, fled with them: Norman Courage and Cowardice on the First Crusade". In Hurlock, Kathryn; Oldfield, Paul (eds.). Crusading and Pilgrimage in the Norman World. The Boydell Press.
- Bouchard, Constance Brittain (1998). Strong of Body, Brave and Noble: Chivalry and Society in Medieval France. Cornell University Press.
- Housley, Norman (2007). Knighthoods of Christ:Essays on the History of the Crusades and the Knights Templar. Ashgate Publishing Limited.
- Kagay, Donald J.; Vann, Theresa M. (1998). On the Social Origins of Medieval Institutions: Essays in Honor of Joseph F O'Callaghan. Brill.
- LoPrete, Kimberly A. (2007). Adela of Blois: Countess and Lord (c.1067-1137). Four Courts Press.
- Riley-Smith, Johathan (1997). The First Crusaders, 1095-1131. Cambridge University Press.
- Suger, (Abbot of St. Denis) (1992). Cusimano, Richard; Moorhead, John (eds.). The Deeds of Louis the Fat. Catholic University Press.
