= Hugh of Crécy =

French noble (died 1147)

Hugh of Crécy (died 31 July 1147), son of Guy II the Red of Rochefort and his wife Adelais de Crécy. Seigneur de Gournay. Seneschal of France under Robert the Pious, 1106–1107. Very little is known about Hugh other than he assassinated his cousin Milo II of Montlhéry.

Hugh helped his father in his rebellion against Louis VI and was forced to flee. Hugh had captured Eudes, Count of Corbell, and Louis besieged the fortress at La Ferté-Alais to free him. Hugh joined with Lancelin, son-in-law to Hugh I, Count of Dammartin, and Theobald II, Count of Champagne, to fight Louis. His sister Lucienne was briefly married to Louis before he became king.

Hugh married a daughter, name unknown, of Amaury III of Montfort and Richilde de Hainaut (daughter of Baudouin II, Count of Hainaut). They had at least two children:

- William I of Bures, Prince of Galilee
- Geoffrey of Burres.

Hugh became a monk at the Cluny Abbey where he died.

== Sources ==
- Riley-Smith, Johathan, The First Crusaders, 1095-1131, Cambridge University Press, London, 1997
