= Rock Fort =

Rock Fort or Rockfort may refer to:

- Tiruchirapalli Rock Fort, a historic fortification and temple complex in India
  - Thayumanaswami Temple, Rockfort, a 6th century Hindu temple
  - Ucchi Pillayar Temple, Rockfort, a 7th century Hindu temple dedicated to Ganesha
- Rockfort (Kingston, Jamaica), a neighborhood on the eastern outskirts of Kingston
- Rockfort (Jamaica), a fort east of Kingston, Jamaica
- Rock Fort Campsite, a historic site where Lewis and Clark camped
- Fort Duvernette, Saint Vincent and the Grenadines, also known as Rock Fort
