= Henri Rochefort (physician) =

French cancer physician

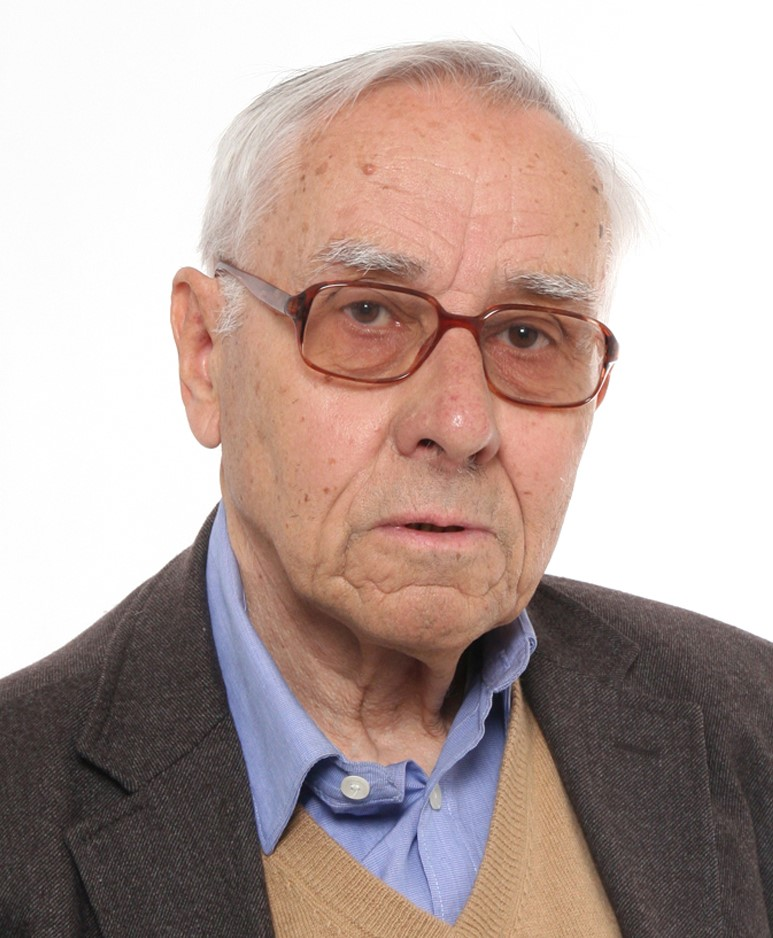
Henri Rochefort

Henri Rochefort is a French biochemical doctor, born on 20 November 1935 in Paris, who studied the influence of various hormones and their antagonists on breast and ovarian cancers. He is a corresponding member of the French Academy of sciences.

== Biography ==
=== Training ===
He was born on 20 November 1935 in Paris to Fernande Bernhart, a decorator and Marcel Rochefort, a photographer.

After secondary studies in Paris (lycée Carnot) where he became a laureate of the Concours Général des lycées en Sciences Naturelles, he followed a university education with a doctorate in medicine in 1968, a licence ès sciences in 1965, a doctorat ès sciences 3e cycle endocrinologie- in 1966, then a doctorat ès sciences in 1972.

He was a medical intern in the Paris hospitals in the 1961 competition in clinical endocrinology departments and trained in research as an associate and then as a research fellow in Étienne-Émile Baulieu's Inserm Unit from 1964 to 1970.

=== Career ===
He was recruited at the Faculty of Medicine of Montpellier as Associate Professor, Hospital Biologist in 1970, then Professor of Biochemistry in 1981, then as Professor of Cell Biology from 1984 to 2004, and finally Professor Emeritus since 2005.

As a hospital biologist, (1970-2001) he developed assays for steroid hormones, hormone receptors and prognostic and predictive tissue markers for response to targeted therapies in breast cancer. He continues his research as founding director of Unit 148 of the Inserm Cellular and Molecular Endocrinology Unit and then Hormones and Cancers Unit (1970-2000).

He is married and has 3 children.

== Main scientific contributions ==
Rochefort's scientific work has focused on the influence of sex steroid hormones and their antagonists in breast and ovarian cancer.

1. Pharmacology of sex steroid receptors. Some androgens are estrogenic when they interact with estrogen receptors (ER) (1-3). As early as 1972, Henri Rochefort showed that antiestrogens inhibit tumor growth via ERs, which then facilitated their routine use in the treatment of positive ER breast cancers. Discovery of a metabolite with a high affinity for RE, 4-hydroxytamoxifen, which is produced in vivo and accumulated in RE positive cancers. A mutation of the enzyme activating tamoxifen by hydroxylation is responsible for some innate tamoxifen resistance in patients treated for breast cancer. Antiestrogens also inhibit the effect of growth factors in the absence of estrogens. RU 486, a progesterone antagonist, inhibits the growth of breast cancer via the progesterone receptor, suggesting the value of anti-progestins for the treatment of antiestrogen-resistant breast cancers expressing this receptor.

2. By specifying the mechanism of estrogen mitogenic action in breast cancer lines, Henri Rochefort and his team discovered cathepsin D as an actor in tumor progression. (17-33) As early as 1980, H. Rochefort with F Vignon introduced the notion of autocrine regulation by mitogenic factors secreted and induced by estrogens. He focused the activity of his research unit on a 52 kilo-dalton glycoprotein, induced by estrogens and growth factors; secreted in excess by breast cancer cells and endowed with autocrine mitogenic activity. With monoclonal antibodies, developed with Sanofi, an assay of 52 K protein in breast cancer extracts in several retrospective double-blind studies showed in a totally unexpected way that high concentrations of this protein in the primary tumor predicted the subsequent development of clinical metastases (an example of serendipity).

The 52k protein was then identified as the precursor of cathepsin D (cathept D) a lysosomal protease diverted into the extracellular matrix.

Henri Rochefort has clarified the mechanism of its transcriptional regulation by estrogens and its deregulation in breast cancers leading to its secretion. Pro cath D acts, depending on the pH of the extracellular tumor medium, as a protease or as the ligand of a membrane receptor to facilitate the survival and growth of micro-metastases that have escaped from the tumor before its removal. After confirmation in many Centres around the world, Cathedral D has become the first example of a protease, the measurement of which in the primary tumor has a prognostic value. Its overexpression after transfection of the D-cath gene into tumor cells increases their metastatic power in athymic mice. Conversely, the inhibition of its production by transfection of anti-sense RNA into breast cancer cells inhibits their growth and metastatic power in these mice. (29-32) Thus, cath D is a potential therapeutic target for breast cancers, mainly triple-negative cancers as well as other solid tumors that overexpress it, such as colorectal cancer and melanoma.

3. Other novel pathways have been opened, such as transcriptional interference between RE and transcriptional factors (AP1), and variations in tissue expression by immunohistochemistry of ovarian hormone receptors (including estrogen beta receptor) in pre-cancerous breast lesions. Fibulin 1, induced by estrogens, is secreted in excess by ovarian cancer cells and accumulated in vivo in the extracellular matrix. Progestogen-induced fatty acid synthase (also a potential therapeutic target. Its early overexpression may partly explain the increase in breast cancer incidence by progestins in women treated for menopause.

Hypersensitivity to estrogens in "at risk" breast lesions may be due to a decrease in the estrogen beta receptor.

In total, starting from fundamental research on human breast cancer lines and after having prepared original specific molecular probes, H. Rochefort has transferred some of his results to the clinic and contributed internationally to the understanding of the mechanisms of hormonal carcinogenesis and to the therapeutic management of breast and ovarian cancers.

4. Since 2000, as Professor Emeritus of Cell Biology and Member of the National Academies of Medicine and Science,

As research was no longer funded in France after retirement, Henri Rochefort reoriented himself towards general topics more directly useful in public health by leading several working groups.

- Reports to the National Academy of Medicine on the Prevention of Breast and Ovarian Cancer.
- Activities at the Academy of Sciences: Organizer of the conference debate in plenary session: "Estrogens, health and environment" (2000).

Henri Rochefort also participated in the creation of the Institut de Cancérologie de Montpellier (IRCM) by transferring the Inserm Hormones and Cancer Unit, and is currently a volunteer consultant in this Institute to facilitate transfer research, close to clinical oncologists.

5. Main books

1989 - Les Antiœstrogènes, with T. Maudelonde, Flammarion, Médecine-Sciences, Paris.

2006 - Hormonal Control of Cell Cycle, in collaboration with S. Mehmed, P. Chanson, Y. Christen. Springer (Heidelberg).

2008 - Hormonal Carcinogenesis V co Publisher with J Li. (Springer- New York) Proceeding of the Vth international symposium in La Grande Motte France. (pj flyer 2005)

2018 - H Rochefort: Hormones et Cancers du sein: Des mécanismes aux thérapies ciblées et à la Prévention. (European University Publishing, Berlin)

Henri Rochefort is the author of numerous scientific articles

== Functions and distinctions ==
=== National ===
- Former President of the Cell Biology Section of the National Committee of Universities,
- Corresponding member of the French Academy of sciences since 1993 (Human Biology and Medical Sciences section).
- Member of the French Academy of Medicine 3rd Division since 2001, President of the Cancer Commission of this academy (2006-2011).

=== International ===
- Member of the Endocrine Society US,
- Member of the American Society for Cell Biology,
- Member of the European Association for Cancer Research,
- Member of the British Biochemical Society.
- Emeritus Member of the American Association for Cancer Research (AACR) (since 2009).
- Invited to numerous plenary conferences in the United States, Japan, Australia, Europe including several Gordon Research Conferences, Keystone and UCLA symposia, Cold Spring Harbor, Breast Cancer Think Tank (1995-2000), and several annual conferences of the AACR, EACR and foreign endocrinology societies.
- Referee in several international endocrinology and cancer journals.

== Prices ==
- 1984 - Gaston Rousseau Prize from the French Academy of sciences
- 1988 - Joannidès Grand Prize of the French Academy of sciences
- 1990 - Léon Baratz Prize from the French Academy of Medicine.
