= Guy II the Red of Rochefort =

French noble (died 1108)

Guy II the Red de Montlhéry (died 1108), son of Guy I, Seigneur de Montlhéry, and Hodierne de Gometz-la-Ferté. He held the titles of Count of Rochefort-en-Yvelines and Châtelain of Châteaufort and of Gometz, and was Seneschal of France under Philip I the Amorous (1104–1106).

Guy joined with the Lombard contingent in the minor Crusade of 1101, later joining the army of Stephen of Blois. He apparently rebelled against Louis VI, King of France (once his son-in-law), when he was killed.

== Family ==
Guy first married Elisabeth from an unknown family. He then married Adelais de Crécy, widow of Bouchard II, Count of Corbeil, grandson of Mauger, Count of Corbeil. Guy and Elisabeth had three children:

- Guy III (d. 19 November 1115), Count of Rochefort. His son Simon (d. before 1125) was also Count of Rochefort.
- Biote de Montlhéry, married Folques, Vicomte of Château-Landon.

Guy and Adelais had three children:

- Hugh of Crécy (d. 31 July 1147). Seigneur de Gournay. Seneschal of France under Robert II, 1106-1107. He apparently helped his father in his rebellion and was forced to flee, becoming a monk at the Cluny Abbey.
- Lucienne (1090 – 6 May 1138), married first to Louis, son of Philip I, and later king of France (annulled by the Council of Troyes on the grounds of consanguinity,) and second to Guichard IV, Seigneur de Beaujeu. No children are recorded from first marriage. The second marriage produced children.
- Beatrix (1105 – after 1168), married first Manasses de Tournan-en-Brie and second Druex, Seigneur de Pierrfonds.

He was succeeded by his son Guy III and then his grandson Simon as Count of Rochefort.

== Sources ==
- Riley-Smith, Jonathan, The First Crusaders, 1095-1131, Cambridge University Press, London, 1997
