= Walter of Saint-Valéry =

Walter of Saint-Valéry (d. after 1098) was a Norman lord who held substantial Manors in Middlesex following the Norman Conquest of England, and later became a key participant in the First Crusade under Robert of Normandy.

Walter was the son of Bernard I of Saint-Valéry, the grand-son of Papia of Normandy (William the Conqueror's aunt), and the great-grandson of Richard II, Duke of Normandy. Walter hailed from Saint Valery-sur-Somme in Flanders, from which William sailed in 1066. Following the Norman Conquest Walter was awarded the Manors of Hampton and Isleworth (comprising the hundred of Hounslow), along with property in Olden and Creeting in Suffolk.

Walter was a participant in the First Crusade, accompanying Robert of Normandy as a member of Robert's army. He was present at the siege of Nicaea in 1097 and scouted with the Turkish Christian convert Bohemond the army of Ridwan before the Battle of the Lake of Antioch. He guarded Adhemar of Le Puy in the mountains near the port of Simeon after finding what was thought to be the Holy Lance.

Walter married Hodierna of Montlhéry, daughter of Guy I of Montlhéry and Hodierna of Gometz. Walter and Hodierna had two sons:

- Bernard II of Saint-Valéry
- Eudon of Saint-Valéry.

Both Bernard II and Eudon took the cross and participated in the First Crusade. Bernard II was present with his father at the siege of Nicaea.

== Sources ==
- Fowler, G. Herbert (1914). "De St. Walery". The Genealogist. Vol. XXX. London: George Bell & Sons. pp. 1–17.
- Runciman, Steven, A History of the Crusades, Volume I: The First Crusade and the Foundation of the Kingdom of Jerusalem, Cambridge University Press, London, 1951
- Riley-Smith, Jonathan, The First Crusaders, 1095-1131, Cambridge University Press, 1997
- La Monte, John L., The Lords of Le Puiset on the Crusades, Speculum, 1942
- Chibnall, Marjorie (translator), The Ecclesiastical History of Orderic Vitalis, Oxford Medieval Texts, Oxford, 1968–1980
- Edgington, Susan B., ed. (2007). Albert of Aachen: Historia Ierosolimitana, History of the Journey to Jerusalem. Oxford Medieval Texts. Clarendon Press. ISBN 978-0-19-920486-1.
