= Lucienne of Rochefort =

Lucienne de Rochefort (1088 – died after 6 May 1137) was the first wife of Louis VI of France. She was married to him before he became king, from 1104 to 1107.

Lucienne de Rochefort was the daughter of Guy II of Rochefort, of the Montlhéry dynasty, and his second wife, Adelais de Crécy.

In 1104, she was betrothed to Louis, oldest son of King Philip I of France. The marriage was arranged to strengthen the ties between the king and her father, who had been appointed seneschal of France. Lucienne and Louis were married for three years, but did not have any children together. According to Abbot Suger of Saint-Denis, who wrote a panegyric in honour of Louis (Vita Ludovici VI), the marriage was not consummated. The marriage was annulled by Pope Paschal II at the Council of Troyes on the grounds of consanguinity 23 May 1107, a year before Louis became king. The reason for the annulment has been the subject of speculation. One theory is that queen Bertrade de Montfort wanted to weaken Louis in order to make her own son, Philip of Mantes, more likely for succession, another was the rivalry of Lucienne's father with the Garlande family, who wished to weaken his position. After her marriage was annulled, Lucienne's father, Guy, and her brother Hugh of Crécy rebelled against Louis.

Lucienne's second husband was Guichard III of Beaujeu (d.1138). With Guichard, Lucienne had the following children:

- Guichard
- Gauthier
- Baldwin of Beaujeu (died young)
- Stephen?
- Alix
- Marie
- a daughter, name unknown, who married Guy I, count of Lyon Forez
- Humbert III of Beaujeu (c.1120-1192), who married Adelaide, a daughter of Amadeus III, Count of Savoy

Lucienne is last mentioned alive on 6 May 1137.

== Sources ==
- Bouchard, Constance Brittain (1987). Sword, Miter, and Cloister: Nobility and the Church in Burgundy, 980-1198. Cornell University Press.
- Bouyer, Christian (2007). Les reines de France: Dictionnaire chronologique. Perrin.
- Bradbury, Jim (2007). The Capetians: kings of France, 987-1328. Hambledon Continuum.
- Chibnall, Marjorie (1969). The Ecclesiastical History of Orderic Vitalis. Vol. 6. Clarendon Press.
- Previte-Orton, C.W. (1912). The Early History of the House of Savoy: 1000-1233. Cambridge University Press.
- Suger (1992). The Deeds of Louis the Fat. Translated by Cusimano, Richard C.; Moorhead, John. The Catholic University of America Press.
- Woll, Carsten (2002). Die Königinnen des hochmittelalterlichen Frankreich 987–1237/38 (in German). Vol. Band 24. Franz Steiner, Stuttgart. ISBN 3-515-08113-5.
