= Hodierna of Gometz =

Sister of the Lord of Gometz and wife of Guy I of Montlhéry

Hodierna (Hodierne) of Gometz (died 1108), sister of William, Lord of Gometz, and wife of Guy I of Montlhéry. She made great donations to the new religious of the order of Saint-Benoît, installed in the Notre-Dame-de-Bonne-Garde Basilica of Longpont-sur-Orge, a monastery founded by her husband. Guy obtained the concession of the church of Long Pont in 1061 of Godfrey, Bishop of Paris. According to Gallia Christiana: "She herself went to Cluny to obtain from the abbot a certain number of monks; And she presented to the abbey a golden chalice of thirty ounces and a precious chasuble.”

It is reported that Hodierne was working in the construction of the church, and that she went to fetch the water from a distant fountain, which still enjoys the reputation of curing fever. It is reported that she came to ask the local blacksmith how to carry his buckets with less fatigue, and that the blacksmith, a brutal man, threw at her a red-hot squash, but Hodierne was not burnt. In order to punish the blacksmith she cursed all the posterity of the hammered men, and swore that any one who came to establish himself at Long Pont would not see the end of the year. The blacksmith soon died. Some people, have written that since that time no blacksmith had been established at Long Pont.

Hodierna married Guy I of Montlhéry and they had seven children:

- Milo I the Great, (also called Milon I) lord of Montlhéry, married Lithuaise, Vicomtesse of Troyes
- Melisende of Montlhéry (d. (1097), married Hugh I, Count of Rethel. Mother of Baldwin II of Jerusalem.
- Elizabeth (Isabel) of Montlhéry, married Joscelin, lord of Courtenay, mother of Joscelin I, Count of Edessa
- Guy II the Red (d. 1108), lord of Rochefort
- Beatrice of Rochefort (1069–1117), married Anseau of Garlande
- Hodierna of Montlhéry, married Walter of Saint-Valery
- Alice of Montlhéry (also called Adele or Alix) (1040–1097), married Hugh I, lord of Le Puiset (1035–1094). Their son was Hugh I of Jaffa and daughter was Humberge of Le Puiset who travelled on the First Crusade with her husband Walo II of Chaumont-en-Vexin. Humberge's cousin (name unknown) was married to Ralph the Red of Pont-Echanfrey who also travelled with her husband on crusade.

The church of the priory was beautiful, very large, and contained a great number of tombs. Hodierne was buried there in front of the high altar, under a tomb that reads: Hodieræ inclytcæ omitisshæ erici montis sacrarum harum Ædium fundatricis ossa. Sub dio jacentia ab anno millesimo, pro nichaelis the masle Domni of the rocks, hujusce domus prioris studio hic translata fuere anno 1651 die ultima mensis augusti. Rue Dame Hodierne exists in her honor at Montlhéry.

== Sources ==
- Dulaure, A., Histoire physique, civile et morale des environs de Paris, tome 6, deuxième édition, p. 152
- Hodierne de Gometz, Dame de Montlhery (available on-line)
- La Monte, John L. (1942). "The Lords of Le Puiset on the Crusades". Speculum. 17 (1). Mediaeval Academy of America.
- Longpont-sous-Montlhéry (1879). Le Cartulaire du Prieuré de Notre-Dame de Longpont de l'Ordre de Cluny au Diocèse de Paris. Lyon: Perrin et Marinet.
- Riley-Smith, Johathan, The First Crusaders, 1095-1131, Cambridge University Press, London, 1997
