= Guy III of Montlhéry =

French noble (died 1109)

Guy III Trousseau (died 1109) was lord of Montlhéry, and the son of Milo I of Montlhéry and Lithuise.

Guy had the temperament of a warrior and went on the First Crusade in 1096. He was one of those who deserted the army during the Siege of Antioch, and did not dare return directly to France, instead returning home by a long detour through Epirus and Italy.

Guy had only one child:

- Elizabeth of Montlhéry, married Philip, Count of Mantes, son of Philip I of France and Bertrada de Montfort.

== Sources ==
- Aird, William M. (2015). "Many others, whose names I do not know, fled with them: Norman Courage and Cowardice on the First Crusade". In Hurlock, Kathryn; Oldfield, Paul (eds.). Crusading and Pilgrimage in the Norman World. The Boydell Press.
- Bradbury, Jim (2007). The Capetians: Kings of France. Hambledon Continuum.
- Frankopan, Peter (2012). The First Crusade: The Call from the East. Harvard University Press.
- LoPrete, Kimberly A. (2007). Adela of Blois: Countess and Lord (c.1067-1137). Four Courts Press.
