= Hugh II Bardoul =

Hugh II Bardoul of Broyes (d. before 1121), son of Barthelemy de Broyes and Elixabeth de Valois (daughter of Raoul III, Count of Valois). Seigneur of Broyes, Beaufort, d'Arc-en-Barrois, and Charmentray. Hugh allegedly attacked that lands of his grandfather Raoul after his death in 1074 with the consent of King Philip, although it seems more likely that the attack was carried out by his father or guardian. Hugh joined with the Lombard contingent on the second wave of the First Crusade, dated to late 1100, serving in the army of Stephen of Blois.

Hugh married Emmeline of Montlhéry, daughter of Milo I of Montlhéry. Hugh and Emmeline had three children:

- Simon I of Broyes (d. 1140), Seigneur of Broyes, married Félicité of Brienne, daughter of Erard I, Count of Brienne. Their son Hugh III of Broyes married Isabella, daughter of Robert I the Great, Count of Dreux.
- Barthelemy of Broyes
- Marie of Broyes.

Hugh’s brother Rainard of Broyes was also a participant in the First Crusade as part of the People's Crusade force of Peter the Hermit, dying in the siege of Niceae in 1096.

== Sources ==
- Riley-Smith, Johathan, The First Crusaders, 1095-1131, Cambridge University Press, London, 1997
- Edgington, Susan, Albert of Aachen: Historia Ierosolimitana, History of the Journey to Jerusalem, Clarendon Press, 2007 (available on Google Books)
- Prof. J. S. C. Riley-Smith, Prof, Jonathan Phillips, Dr. Alan V. Murray, Dr. Guy Perry, Dr. Nicholas Morton, A Database of Crusaders to the Holy Land, 1099-1149 (available on-line)
