= Rochefort-en-Yvelines =

- Commune
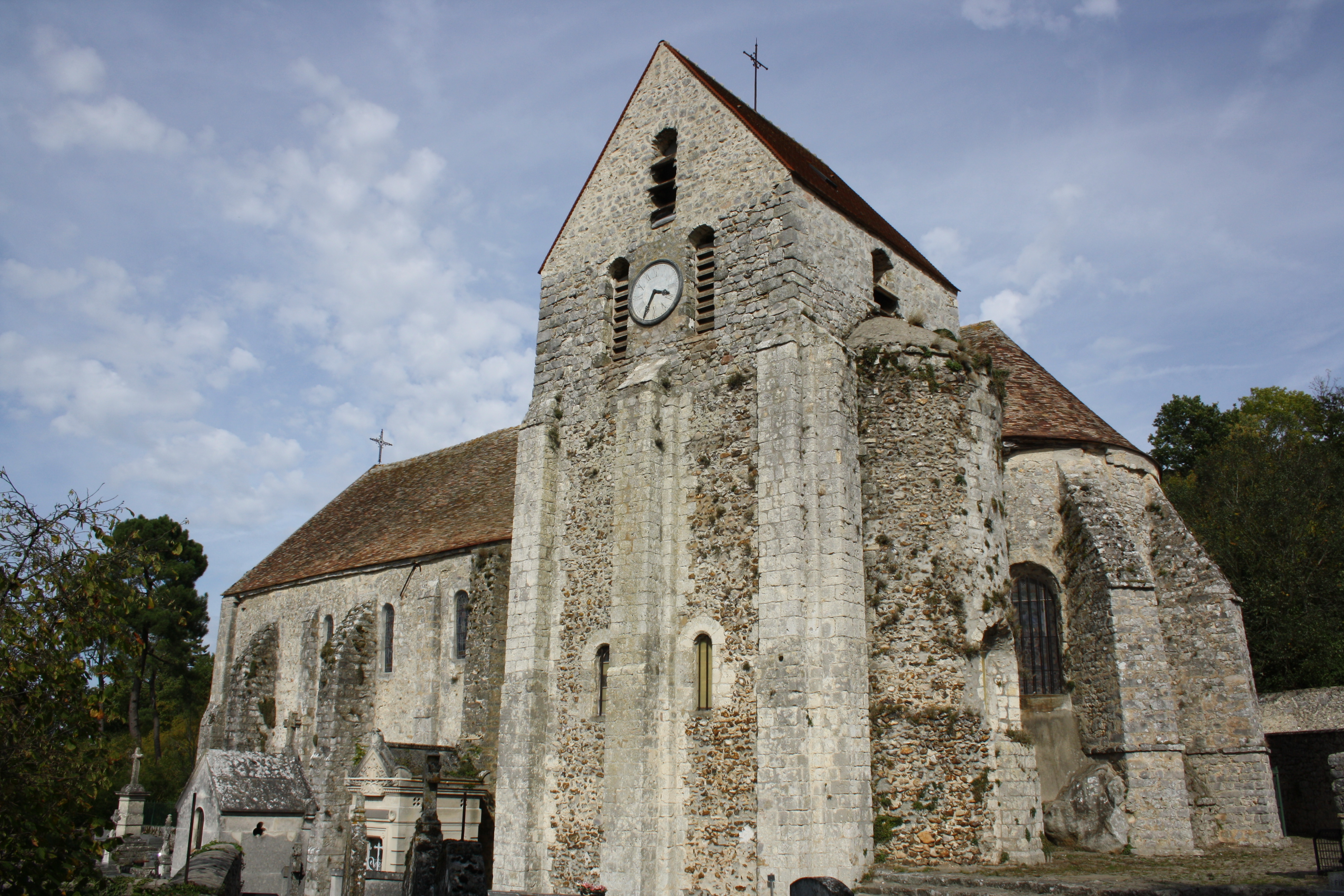
- The church in Rochefort-en-Yvelines

- Coat of arms
- Location of Rochefort-en-Yvelines
- Location within France Location within Île-de-France (region)
- Coordinates: 48°35′12″N 1°59′19″E
- Country: France
- Region: Île-de-France
- Department: Yvelines
- Arrondissement: Rambouillet
- Canton: Rambouillet
- Intercommunality: CA Rambouillet Territoires

Government
  - Mayor (2020–2026): Sylvain Lambert
- Area^{1}: 12.59 km^{2} (4.86 sq mi)
- Highest elevation: 163 m (535 ft)
- Lowest elevation: 85 m (279 ft)
- Population (2023): 910
  - Density: 72/km^{2} (190/sq mi)
- Time zone: UTC+01:00 (CET)
  - Summer (DST): UTC+02:00 (CEST)
- INSEE/Postal code: 78522 /78730
- ^{1} French Land Register data, which excludes lakes, ponds, glaciers > 1 km^{2} (0.386 sq mi or 247 acres) and river estuaries.

Rochefort-en-Yvelines (French pronunciation: [ʁɔʃfɔʁ ɑ̃.n‿ivlin]) is a commune in the Yvelines department, part of the arrondissement of Rambouillet in the Île-de-France region in France.

== See also ==
- Communes of the Yvelines department
