= Church of St Andrew, Weaverthorpe =

Anglican church in Yorkshire, England

Church of St Andrew
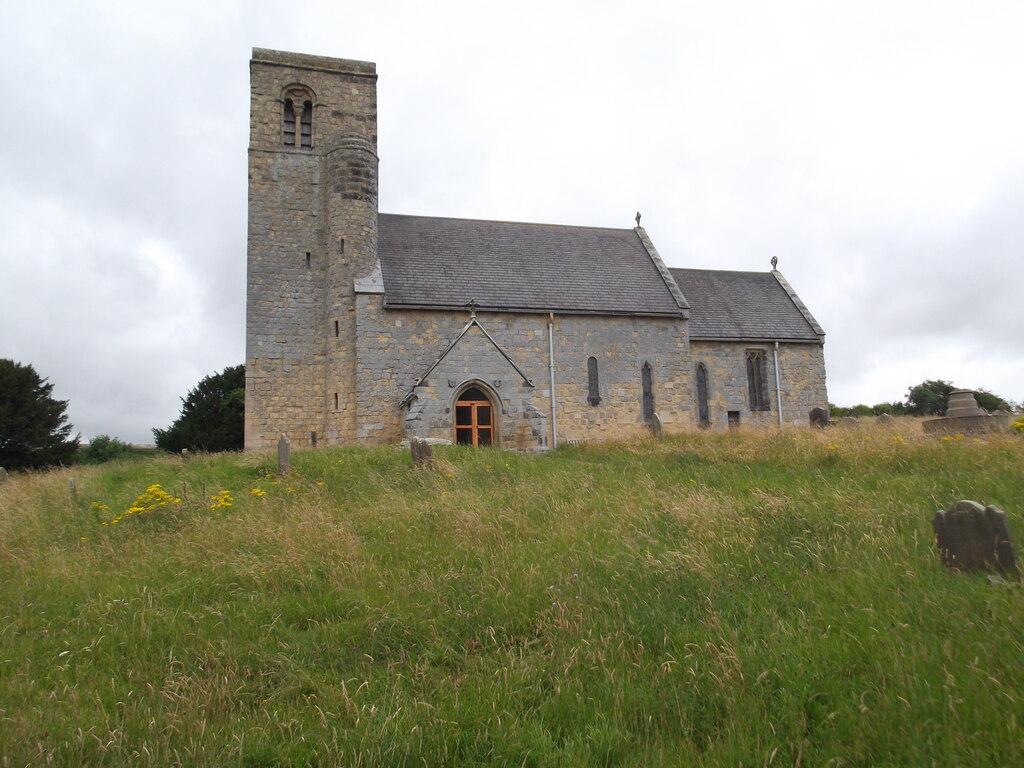
- St Andrew's Church, Weaverthorpe
- Church of St Andrew
- 54.1267°N 0.5223°W
- OS grid reference: SE966710
- Location: Weaverthorpe, North Yorkshire
- Country: England
- Denomination: Church of England
- Website: official webpage

History
- Status: Parish church
- Founded: c. 1120
- Founder: Herbert of Winchester
- Dedication: St Andrew
- Other dedication: All Saints (Note: An article in the Yorkshire Archaeological Journal from 1873 states that the name of the church was changed to All Saints, however, it is known as the Church of St Andrew.)

Architecture
- Functional status: Active

Administration
- Diocese: Diocese of York
- Archdeaconry: York
- Deanery: Southern Ryedale
- Benefice: Weaverthorpe with Helperthorpe.....
- Parish: Weaverthorpe

Clergy
- Vicar: Nicola Penn-Allison

Listed Building – Grade I
- Designated: 10 August 1966
- Reference no.: 1175527

The Church of St Andrew is a grade I listed Anglican church in the village of Weaverthorpe, North Yorkshire, England. The church dates back to the 12th century and was renovated in 1870 by George Edmund Street at the behest of Sir Tatton Sykes. The church is largely Norman in its architectural style and is believed to have been built c. 1120 due to an inscription on the sundial above the south door which details Herbert of Winchester as its builder. Winchester owned the manor from 1110 to his death in 1130 and historical documents point to an agreement to build a church in 1114.

== History ==
No church existed in the settlement of Weaverthorpe in 1086, however a church was in the same named manor of the time (in what is now Cowlam) at the domesday survey, where the land mostly belonged to St Peter, who was archbishop of York. The tower, chancel and nave are all of Norman origin and built from a calcareous gritstone quarried either at nearby Birdsall, or Filey Brigg. The south porch is later addition from the 14th century. The church itself is thought to date to the 1120s due to an inscription on a sundial in the tympanum of the arch above the south doorway. The wording is carved in a block of freestone some 1-foot-2-inch (0.36 m) wide and 12.5 inches (320 mm) deep. The inscription reads "In honour of the Apostle St Andrew, Herbert of Winchester, who founded this church in the time of the King". The inscription is in Latin (Note: The text is as follows: In honore sci andreae apostoli herebertus wintonie hoc monasterium um fecit im tempore re.) and uses the word monasteri (monasterium) which is a reference to a minster church. The inscription is thought to have continued but weathering and other decay have rendered any further words unintelligble. A feoffment involving Henry and the archbishop of York between 1108 and 1114 is thought to be when the building of a church was agreed upon. Herbert was granted the manor of Weaverthorpe in 1110, and he died in 1130, which gives the narrow window for when the church was built. (Note: Norton states that the dating of the church can be given with unusual precision for a church built in the 12th century. "It must have been built between c.1109 (date of the grant of the church by Archbishop Thomas II to Herbert) and 1121 (date of the gift of Weaverthorpe church to Nostell Priory by William fitzHerbert.")

The church is built on the northern ridge of the Great Wold Valley overlooking, and set apart from, the village of Weaverthorpe at a height of 315 feet (96 m) above sea level. The position and elevation have led to people describing the church as having a "commanding view" over the valley and settlement. The position of the church on the hill makes it a known Yorkshire Wolds landmark. The church was built adjacent to the manor house (just to the east) and with the manor house now demolished the church seems to stand isolated from the village though some of the old manor house grounds have been incorporated into an extended churchyard.

Weaverthorpe church diagram

The walls of the church are lined both inside and out with squared ashlar stone in what Norton describes as "carefully laid courses". The walls vary in thickness between 2 feet 4 inches (0.71 m) to 2 feet 7 inches (0.79 m) and the chancel is 22 feet 10 inches (6.96 m) in length, by 16 feet 11 inches (5.16 m) in width. The nave is 42 feet 11 inches (13.08 m) in length, by 23 feet 1.5 inches (7.049 m) width and was built aisleless. The four-stage tower is slightly off-square being 10 feet 10 inches (3.30 m) from north to south, and 10 feet 8 inches (3.25 m) from west to east. The tower has a spiral staircase on the south-west corner of the nave which also extends slightly from the tower. From the outside this appears as a semi-circular turret on the south-western tower wall. The tower is noted as being an example of Early Norman architecture and is very plain compared to later Norman towers.

Herbert's son, William the Treasurer of York, donated the church to the monks of Nostell Priory with the permission of Archbishop Thurstan. This may have been political in its nature for this gift was the only time William the Treasurer has a recorded endowment, which was also outside of his archdeaconry, and may have been a way for him to gain favour with the king. However, the advowson remained with Reginald, son of Peter fitzHerbert, who in 1269 gave the rectory at Weaverthorpe to the dean and chapter of York Minster. In 1853, the Ecclesiastical Commissioners sold the estate in 1853 to Lord Downe. The Commissioners built a new vicarage house in 1867 at a cost of £1,700 (equivalent to £165,000 in 2025), but this was sold in 1926 when Helperthorpe and Weaverthorpe became a united parish.

By the 1860s the church was in a poor state of repair, and could only claim to have an average of ten people during Sunday services. Sir Tatton Sykes paid G. E. Street to restore the church between 1870 and 1872, which helped to pave the way for an "Anglican revival" in the village. As part of the renovations, a pyramidal roof was added to the tower by Street, but this was removed in 1898. Street is believed to have installed the seating in the nave, but the choir-stalls which are decorated with tree patterns are believed to be the work of Temple Moore from 1895. Likewise, the roofs of the chancel and nave were lowered and adapted by Street. The roof tiles were replaced by a composite material in the 1950s, but these had worn out by the turn of the 21st century. During the 19th century installation of pews on the south side of the church, human remains were found underneath the church floor which were simply reburied elsewhere in the church. A 2006 archaeological investigation uncovered these remains and established that there were at least nine human skeletons under the floor.

Some of the medieval slabs and headstones were used to rebuild the porch during the renovations. The use of gravestones led to an exchange in the local papers accusing those renovating the church of "modern vandalism", and that "[stone] must have indeed been scarce, or the restoration fund very inadequate to have induced such a violation of decency." The church was re-opened by the Archbishop of York on 11 April 1872, where, owing to the number of people who could not fit into the church, the archbishop preached his sermon in the churchyard.

The drum-shaped font measures 28 inches (710 mm) in diameter and has a depth of 24 inches (610 mm). It dates back to the 12th century and is decorated with small circles and octagons which are patterned horizontally and vertically. Some of the octagons contain a cross, thought to be a saltire, which are believed to be in honour of the church's dedication, St Andrew. Despite the lack of archaeological association and historical evidence the font stylistically is thought to date from Saxon times. There is a polyptych above the altar consisting of five panels in gold and colour. The subject painted is that of the crucifixion and contains a quote from the Gloria at the bottom: "Domine Deus, Agnes Dei, Filius Patris, Qui Tollis peccata mundi: Miserere nobis". (Note: Latin: O Lord God, lamb of God, Son of the Father, Who takest away the sins of the world, have mercy on us.)

The church was grade I listed in 1966, and the tower was repaired in 1992 at a cost of £44,500.

== Parish and clergy ==
The ancient parish of Weaverthorpe included Helperthorpe, East Lutton and West Lutton. Helperthorpe became a separate ecclesiastical parish in 1248 but relied on St Andrew's for burial purposes until the 1877. The Church of St Andrew was the mother church of this large parish. The church is in the parish of Weaverthorpe, in the benefice of Weaverthorpe with Helperthorpe, Luttons Ambo, Kirby Grindalythe and Wharram le Street, in the deanery of Southern Ryedale and in the Archdeaconry and Diocese of York. Before the renovations of the 1870s, throughout the 19th century the church was known by the dedication of All Saints and was deemed to be a Peculiar. It was also exempted from being within the Diocese of York.

In 1490, the vicar, Richard Beleby, was charged with having a "suspicious woman in his house" and of failing to carry out services and not blessing the candles at the Feast of the Purification.

Between 1958 and 1961, Morris Maddocks was the incumbent vicar; he later became an assistant bishop in the Church of England. The current vicar is Nicola Penn-Allison who was installed in 2024.

== Churchyard ==
Evidence of non-Christian burials from the 3rd and 4th centuries has been uncovered in the churchyard. Bodies were orientated in a north–south direction, as opposed to facing east as normal for the Middle Ages. The churchyard was extended during the renovations between 1870 and 1872, and was extended again in 1959/1960. The extension of the churchyard in the 1870s also involved the building of a lychgate and the external surrounding walls. These were grade II listed in 1987.

A recumbent gravestone located some 11 feet (3.5 m) south of the porch on the church was grade II listed in 1987; the figure is believed to date to the 14th century. The churchyard contains one Commonwealth War Grave.

== See also ==
- Grade I listed buildings in North Yorkshire
- Listed buildings in Weaverthorpe
