= Agnes of Blois =

French noblewoman (died 1229)

Agnes of Blois (Note: (French: Agnès de Blois, pronounced [aɲɛs də blwa])) or de Puiset (died c. 1129) was a French noblewoman, she was Countess of Corbeil, Lady of Le Puiset, and Viscountess of Chartres from 1104 until her death in 1129 as the wife of Hugh III of Le Puiset.

== Biography ==
=== Birth and background ===
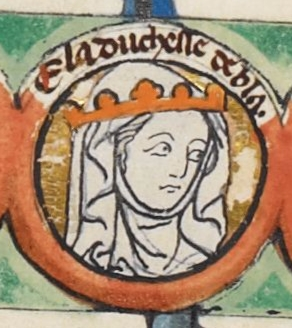
13th century miniature of her mother Adela of Normandy (1067–1137).

Agnes was the second daughter and sixth child of Stephen, Count of Blois and his wife, Adela of Normandy, (Note: Sources vary, however Theodore Evergates claims Agnes was the step-daughter of Adela, (see Evergates 2010, pp. 26, 36)) and thus a sister of Stephen of Blois (later Stephen, King of England). Her mother was an English princess and was the youngest daughter of King William the Conqueror (r. 1066–1087).

=== Marriage and issue ===
In 1104, Agnes married Hugh III of Le Puiset. In 1118, Hugh fought in a siege where he killed his great-uncle, Anseau of Garlande and was imprisoned by King Louis VI of France (r. 1108–1137). However, he was eventually freed and fought in the Holy Land in Palestine.

Agnes and Hugh had three children:

1. Éverard IV, Viscount of Chartres, no issue.
2. Bouchard de Puiset, Archdeacon of Orléans, had issue.
3. Hugh de Puiset (c. 1125 – 3 March 1195); Bishop of Durham, had issue.
