= Hugh de Puiset =

12th-century English Bishop

- Bishop of Durham
- Elected: 22 January 1153
- Installed: 2 May 1154
- Predecessor: William of St. Barbara
- Successor: Philip of Poitou
- Other post: Archdeacon of Winchester

Orders
- Consecration: 20 December 1153 by Pope Anastasius IV

Personal details
- Born: c. 1125
- Died: 3 March 1195
- Parents: Hugh, lord of Puiset and Agnes
- Children: 4

Chief Justiciar of England
- In office 1189–1190
- Monarch: Richard I
- Preceded by: Ranulf de Glanvill
- Succeeded by: William Longchamp

Sheriff of Northumberland
- In office 1189–1190?

Hugh de Puiset (Note: Sometimes known as Hugh du Puiset or Hugh Pudsey; Latin: Hugo de Puteaco) (c. 1125 – 3 March 1195) was a medieval Bishop of Durham and Chief Justiciar of England under King Richard I. He was the nephew of King Stephen of England and Henry of Blois, who both assisted Hugh's ecclesiastical career. He held the office of treasurer of York for a number of years, which led him into conflict with Henry Murdac, Archbishop of York. In 1153, Hugh was elected bishop of Durham despite the opposition of Murdac.

Hugh was not involved in the controversy between King Henry II and Thomas Becket, Archbishop of Canterbury. The king suspected Hugh of supporting Henry's heir, Henry the Young King, when the prince rebelled. Additionally, Hugh was suspected of aiding the King of Scots, William I, during an invasion of Northern England in 1174. After the accession of Henry's second son, Richard, as king, Hugh bought the office of Sheriff of Northumberland as well as the earldom of Northumbria. He also acquired the office of Justiciar, which he was supposed to share with William de Mandeville, but with Mandeville's death, Hugh shared the office with William Longchamp. Longchamp secured the office for himself by the middle of 1190.

As a bishop, Hugh was noted as a builder, including a stone bridge in the city of Durham and the Galilee Chapel in Durham Cathedral. His administration of the episcopal lands included an inquest into the exact holdings of the bishopric. As a patron, Hugh sponsored the career of the medieval chronicler Roger of Hoveden. Hugh had a long-term mistress, by whom he had at least two sons and possibly two more.

== Early life ==
Hugh was the nephew of brothers King Stephen of England and Henry of Blois, the younger son of Hugh III, lord of Puiset, and Agnes, sister of Stephen and Henry. Agnes' parents were Stephen, Count of Blois, and Adela, a daughter of King William the Conqueror. His paternal family held a lordship in Northern France. Hugh was born in approximately 1125, for in 1153 with his election as bishop he was still under the canonical age limit for bishops of 28. (Note: The parentage and grandparentage of Hugh rests on the medieval chronicler Roger of Hovedon and documents from the cathedral chapter of Durham.) Henry acquired for Hugh the office of archdeacon in the see of Winchester, sometime before 1139.

Hugh afterwards became archdeacon of York and treasurer of York, sometime around 1143, probably through the patronage of William FitzHerbert while he was serving his first term as Archbishop of York. While treasurer, he was a member of the party at York that wanted to elect Hilary as archbishop after William FitzHerbert's deposition in 1147. The successful candidate was Henry Murdac, the Abbot of Fountains, who was supported by the bishops of Durham and Carlisle, William of St. Barbara and Æthelwold. Murdac excommunicated Hugh, who returned the gesture.

== Bishop of Durham under Henry II ==
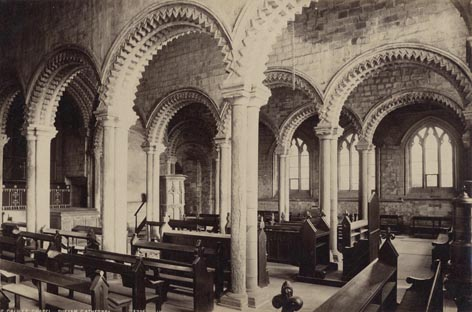
An 1890 photograph of the Galilee Chapel

On 22 January 1153, Hugh was elected to the see of Durham by the cathedral chapter in spite of the opposition of Henry Murdac, who excommunicated the chapter in response. Because of Murdac's opposition and refusal to confirm the election, Hugh obtained consecration only by making a personal visit to Rome, where the pope was able to overrule the Archbishop of York. He was consecrated on 20 December 1153 by Pope Anastasius IV. Hugh was enthroned, or ceremonially installed as bishop in his cathedral, at Durham on 2 May 1154. King Stephen granted to Puiset as bishop of Durham the mineral rights in Weardale, which included lead mines. Silver was also extracted from the lead ore mined there, and that silver probably helped the bishops form their own mint.

Hugh may not have attended the coronation of King Henry II and his queen Eleanor of Aquitaine. Some sources place him at the coronation; others do not. Nor did he attend the Council of Clarendon in 1164 that issued the Constitutions of Clarendon, which was the cause of the quarrel between the king and Thomas Becket. In the ensuing dispute between the king and Becket Hugh did not take sides. He was, however, present with Roger de Pont L'Évêque, the Archbishop of York at the coronation of the king's eldest son, Henry the Young King, in 1170, and consequently was suspended by Alexander III. The coronation of the Young King eventually led to Becket's martyrdom in December 1170.

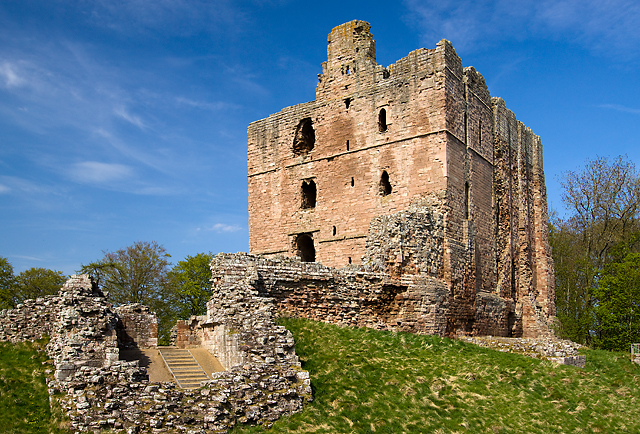
The great tower at Norham Castle was built during Hugh de Puiset's tenure.

Hugh was suspected of involvement in the Young King's revolt in 1173. He does not seem to have taken an active part but King Henry II suspected him of supporting the rebellion. When King William the Lion of Scotland invaded northern England in the spring of 1174, Hugh either connived at the invasion or helped the rebels and the Scottish king. Suspicion fell upon the bishop because he was cautious in defending against the Scottish raids. Hugh also concluded truces with the Scots, allowing them free passage through the ecclesiastical lands in return for no damage being done to those lands. Lastly, the bishop's nephew Hugh IV de Puiset, who was Count of Bar-sur-Seine in France, brought an armed force to Hartlepool, supposedly to help defend Hugh, but King Henry feared that it was an attempt to aid the rebellion of the Young King. After the revolt had been put down, King Henry II ordered Hugh's castle of Northallerton to be destroyed. Hugh was also required to surrender his other castles. Hugh obtained an exemption allowing him to keep his castle at Northallerton in Yorkshire when Henry was ordering the destruction of most of the illegal castles that had been built during King Stephen's reign. He also built a castle at Norham, designed to help defend the north of England against raids from Scotland.

In ecclesiastical affairs, Hugh attended the 1163 Council of Tours, which was held by Pope Alexander III. In 1179, he attended the Lateran Council in Rome. It was while he was there that he became involved in the conflict between the king of Scots and the chapter of St Andrews over the election of the bishop of St Andrews. The king wanted his chaplain, another Hugh, and the chapter wanted John the Scot. The pope ordered Puiset to compel the king to obey, but in 1183 the controversy was solved by a compromise.

When King Richard I began his reign in 1189, Hugh bought the offices of Earl of Northumbria and Sheriff of Northumberland. Hugh paid 2000 pounds for the office and a further 1000 pounds for the office of Justiciar and a release from his crusading vow. The charter granting Hugh the earldom mentioned that Richard had invested the bishop with the earldom "by the sword and ring", which is the earliest mention in a charter of that method of investing an honour. Richard also filled the office of Archbishop of York, which had been vacant since 1181, with Richard's illegitimate half-brother Geoffrey. The continued vacancy at York had increased Hugh's power, as he had no superior as long as there was no archbishop. For two years, Geoffrey was unable to secure consecration, but in 1191, a new pope, Celestine III was elected, and Celestine consecrated Geoffrey and ordered Hugh to submit to Geoffrey.

Hugh shared the office of justiciar with William de Mandeville, but Mandeville died soon after taking office. Richard then promoted William Longchamp to share the office with Hugh. The two men did not get along, and in March 1190 Richard split the authority, giving Hugh authority north of the Humber River and giving authority over the rest of England to Longchamp. This arrangement was not permanent, and Longchamp outmanoeuvred Hugh to become sole justiciar by the middle of 1190. Longchamp arrested Hugh for overstepping his authority and made him surrender his castle, his earldom, and hostages, although the real cause wasn't overstepping authority but Longchamp's animosity towards Hugh. William of Newburgh, the medieval chronicler, felt that a bishop taking the office of Justiciar was wrong, and stated that God would not accept the loyalties of "a bishop who wishes to please both the heavenly and the earthly king."

When Prince John, Richard's younger brother, rebelled during King Richard's captivity in 1193, Hugh opposed the rebellion. Hugh attacked some of John's northern holdings. In concert with Archbishop Geoffrey he laid siege to Tickhill Castle in South Yorkshire.

== Death and legacy ==
Hugh ordered an inquest into the revenues and resources of his bishopric, along with the customs of the see. This took place in 1183, and when it was finished, the results were entered into a register that became known as the Boldon Book. Hugh also fought a long-running disagreement with his own cathedral chapter over the right to oversee the monks, a conflict that lasted about 40 years. This led to the monks forging many documents purporting to show that earlier bishops had granted the monks rights and privileges exempting them from episcopal oversight. He also fought with Archbishop Roger of York over lands they both held in each other's see.

As a builder, Hugh built the New Bridge, now Elvet Bridge, in Durham, the second stone bridge in the town. Hugh also oversaw work on Durham Cathedral, decorating the inside with marble, installing stained-glass windows, putting in a shrine for the bones of Bede, and building the Galilee Chapel onto the west end of the cathedral. Originally, Puiset had planned to put in a Lady Chapel on the east end of the cathedral, but the ground was unsuitable, and instead work began on the Galilee Chapel at the west end of the cathedral. The Galilee Chapel is unusual in that it has five aisles and quatrefoil, or four-lobed, piers. A model for the chapel may have been the work being done on York Minster in rebuilding the choir. The current Norman doorway and the gallery above the doorway in Durham Castle were also the work of Hugh, which was part of a hall built in the bailey of the castle. Along with the king of Scots, he built the first bridge over the River Tweed at Berwick. He also rebuilt Norham Castle, replacing the previous buildings by Ranulf Flambard, an earlier bishop, with a stone castle.

Hugh was known for his extravagant tastes and opulent lifestyle, as well as his extensive library. He had a son, Henry, who was one of the hostages demanded by Longchamp in 1190. Another son was Hugh, who became chancellor for King Philip II of France. Both Henry and Hugh were the sons of the bishop's long-term mistress, Alice de Percy. Alice may have been the mother of two more of the bishop's sons, William, archdeacon of Northumberland, and Burchard, archdeacon of Durham and treasurer of York. (Note: Burchard is sometimes stated to have been Hugh's nephew instead of his son.) He had a number of other mistresses but Alice was the most public, so much so that it caused a scandal and closely resembled a marriage.

Hugh was not well known as a scholar. He did, however, serve as a patron to Roger of Hoveden, the medieval chronicler who started writing about 1169. He also commissioned two large Bibles, one of which remains at Durham and is considered a masterpiece of book creation. It is Durham Cathedral Library Manuscript A. II. 1.

Hugh died on 3 March 1195, having ruled his diocese for an exceptionally long time, forty-two years.

== Citations ==
Political offices
Preceded by Ranulf de Glanvill	Chief Justiciar shared with William de Mandeville until November 1189 and then with William Longchamp; 1189–1190	Succeeded by William Longchamp
Catholic Church titles
Preceded by William of St. Barbara	Bishop of Durham; 1153–1195	Succeeded by Philip of Poitou
