= Osbert de Bayeux =

12th-century English priest

- Archdeacon of Richmond
- Archdiocese: York
- Province: York
- Diocese: Diocese of York
- Installed: before 1128
- Term ended: before 1158
- Predecessor: none known
- Successor: Bartholomew

Osbert de Bayeux (floruit 1121 to 1184) was a medieval English cleric and archdeacon in the Diocese of York. A relative of Thurstan, the Archbishop of York, Osbert probably owed his ecclesiastical positions to this relative. After Thurstan's death, Osbert was opposed to one of the candidates for the archbishopric, William fitzHerbert, and worked to secure fitzHerbert's deposition and replacement by Henry Murdac.

After Murdac's death in 1153, Osbert tried to prevent the return of fitzHerbert, but these attempts were unsuccessful. When fitzHerbert died suddenly in 1154, Osbert was accused of murdering the newly returned archbishop. Although he was never convicted of the murder in either a secular or an ecclesiastical court, he was stripped of his clerical status and became a layman before 1158. He died after 1184, perhaps even after 1194.

== Early life ==
Osbert was first mentioned in the historical record between 1121 and 1128 when he appears in a charter, which although likely a forgery, probably contains an authentic witness list. This document lists him as "Osbert archdeacon", which means that he probably held the archdeaconry of Richmond. (Note: Earlier scholarship by David Knowles felt that Osbert was Archdeacon of York, but the 1999 volume for York of the Fasti Ecclesiae Anglicanae 1066-1300 states he was Archdeacon of Richmond.) He was the nephew of Thurstan, who was Archbishop of York from 1114 to 1140. Presumably he owed his position as archdeacon to his uncle and was probably appointed at a young age. A charter of Thurstan's, dating to around 1138, names Osbert explicitly as Thurstan's nephew.

== Opposition to William fitzHerbert ==
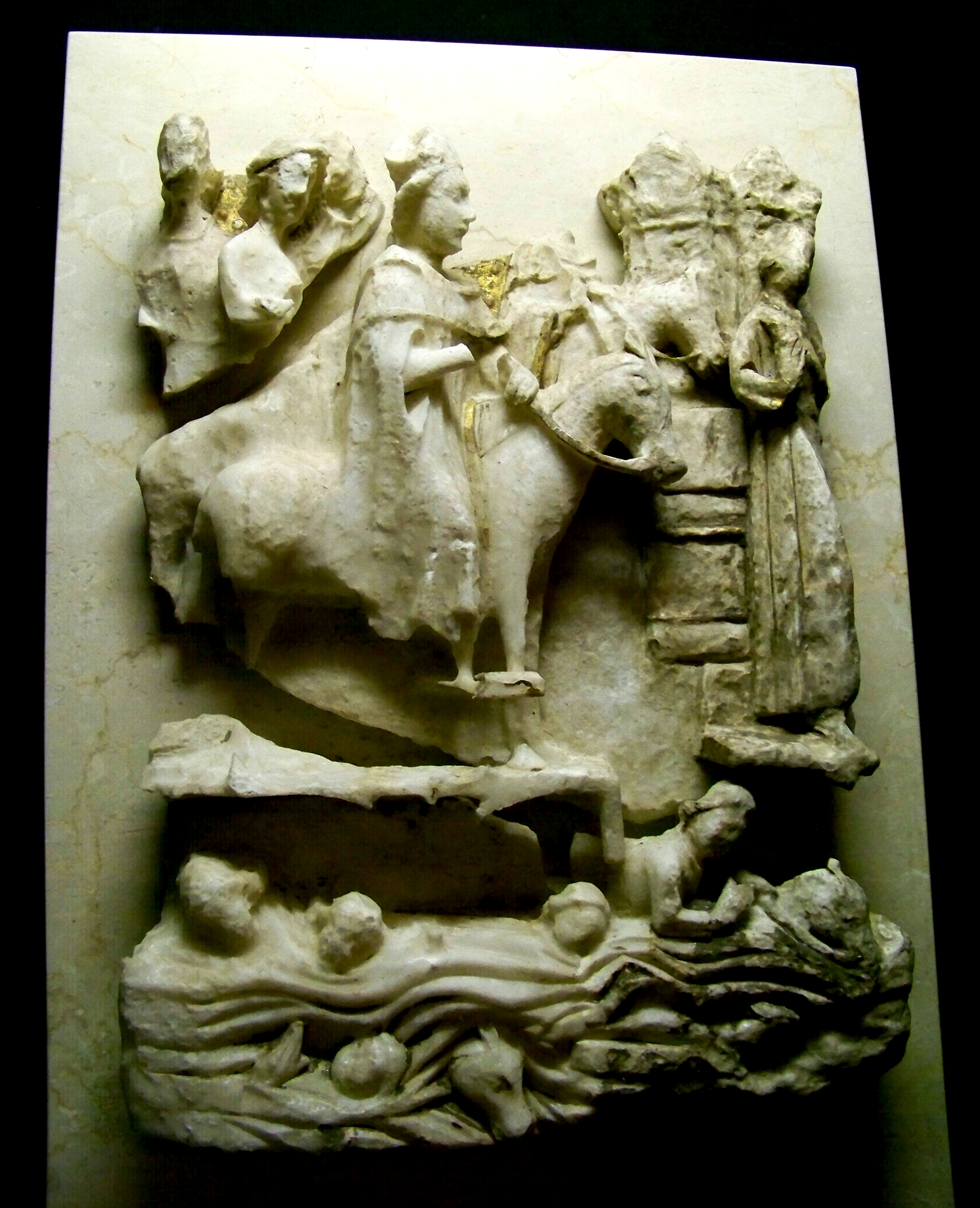
A medieval plaque showing William of York's miraculous escape from death when a bridge collapsed under him.

Osbert was opposed to the election of William fitzHerbert as Archbishop of York and supported William's rival and successor, Henry Murdac. Although he remained a supporter of Murdac after 1147, he did oppose Murdac's interventions in Selby Abbey, where Murdac had deposed one abbot and appointed another. In 1153, Osbert deposed Murdac's choice as abbot of Selby and appointed another abbot. Originally, Osbert had supported Elias Paynel, Murdac's choice for abbot, but then changed his stance and helped with the deposition.

After Murdac's death in 1153, Osbert was opposed to William's return as archbishop, but was unsuccessful in his attempts to prevent William's reappointment. William died a week after his return to York, however, and Osbert, along with Robert of Ghent, the Dean of York, secured the quick election of the new archbishop, Roger de Pont L'Évêque.

== Poisoning accusations ==
Osbert was accused of murdering William, specifically by poisoning him through the communion chalice. A fellow cleric, Symphorian, who had been a chaplain of the deceased archbishop, brought murder charges against Osbert. Symphorian obtained a hearing on the charges at a royal council presided over by King Stephen of England at Michaelmas in 1154, but Stephen's subsequent death prevented a resolution. Osbert attempted to have the trial switched to an ecclesiastical court and was supported in his efforts by Archbishop Theobald of Canterbury. A trial was finally held in 1156, and Osbert's accuser did not produce any witnesses, but Osbert was unable to prove his innocence, prompting the transfer of the case to a papal court. No record of any judgment exists, but Osbert apparently appeared before two popes, Adrian IV and Alexander III. A further appeal to the papal court was referred to papal judges-delegate between 1175 and 1180.

The case attracted commentary by two contemporary writers. John of Salisbury, who was a secretary for Theobald, added information about Osbert in a letter to Alexander III on unrelated business. In the section of the letter, John pointed out to the pope that no matter what others might say about Osbert, he had failed to secure other clergy willing to swear that he was innocent. Another contemporary, Gilbert Foliot, who was Bishop of Hereford, wrote to the pope to remind him that although Osbert's accuser had offered to prove his accusations by undergoing a trial by ordeal, this was essentially meaningless since canon law forbade the clergy from the ordeal.

== Later life and death ==
Osbert was no longer archdeacon by 1158, as his successor is attested by that point. Osbert, however, continued to call himself "archdeacon" even though he held land as a secular lord, including lands in Lacy and Skipton. He also acted as a steward for Hugh de Tilly. Osbert was still alive in 1184, as he was a witness to a document at York then, and may have been alive as late as 1194, when Hugh Bardulf was responsible for the farm of Osbert's lands, as the record of that transaction in the escheat roll is unclear if Osbert was alive at that time or dead.

Osbert had two sons, William de Bayeux and Thurstan de Baius. Osbert was a benefactor to a number of monasteries, including Drax Priory, Pontefract Priory and Gisborough Priory. He also gave land to a hospital in York and to the Templars and Hospitallers.
