= Henry of Winchester =

Henry of Winchester was the nickname of:

- Henry III of England (1207-1272)
- Henry of Blois (1101–1171), abbot of Glastonbury Abbey and bishop of Winchester
