= Weaverthorpe =

Village and civil parish in North Yorkshire, England

Coordinates: 54.1245°N 0.52411°W

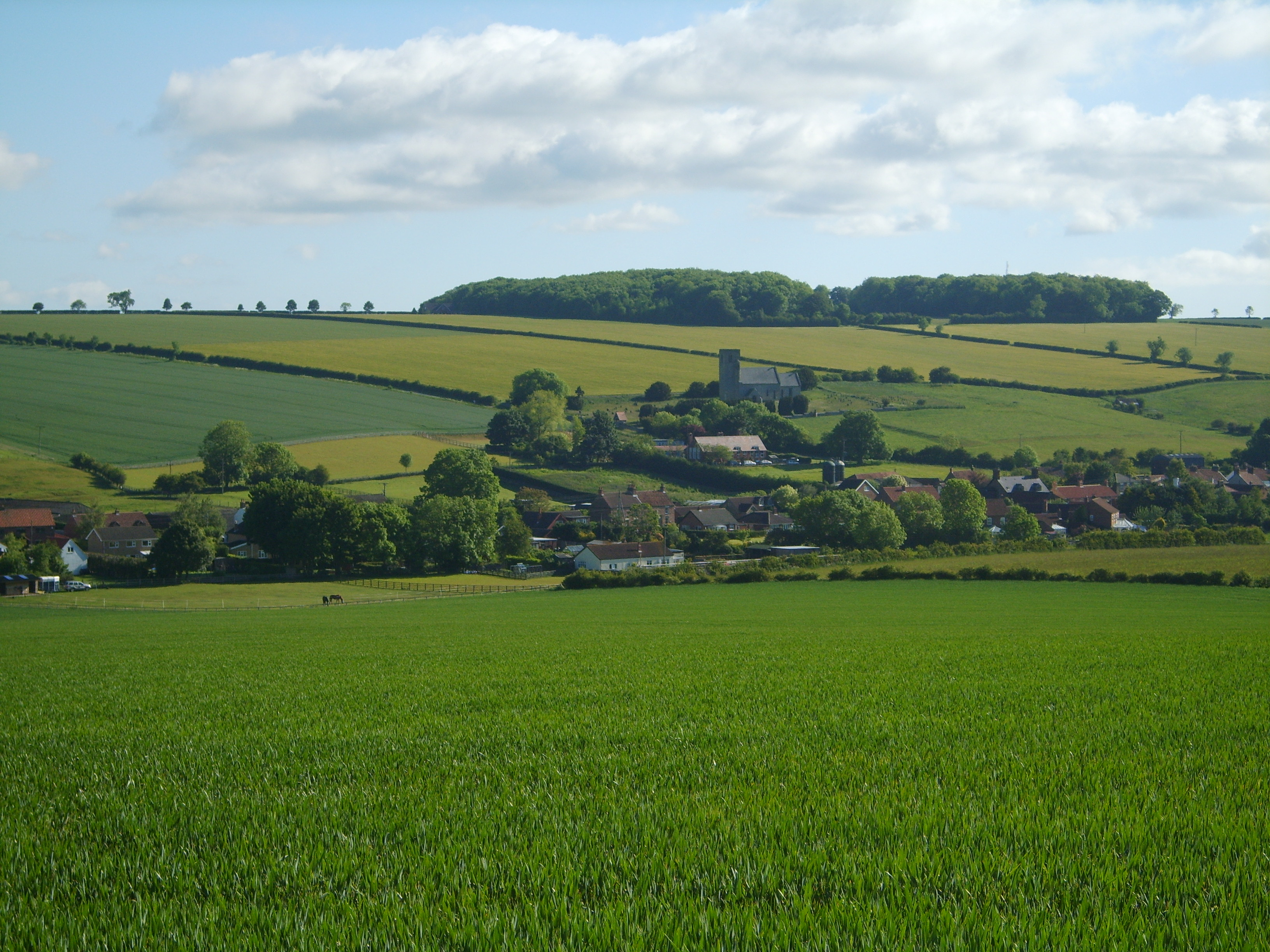
- Looking north over Weaverthorpe

- Location within North Yorkshire
- Population: 349 (2011 census)
- OS grid reference: SE965708
- Unitary authority: North Yorkshire
- Ceremonial county: North Yorkshire
- Region: Yorkshire and the Humber
- Country: England
- Sovereign state: United Kingdom
- Post town: MALTON
- Postcode district: YO17
- Police: North Yorkshire
- Fire: North Yorkshire
- Ambulance: Yorkshire
- UK Parliament: Thirsk and Malton

Weaverthorpe is a village and civil parish in North Yorkshire, England. It is 13 miles (21 km) south-west of Scarborough.

== History ==
Bronze Age settlements have been found at nearby Cowlam, which is 2.8 miles (4.5 km) to the south. It was one of the leading burial sites in Yorkshire where the dead were interred in their chariots.

There was a vill on the site in the period of Viking/Norse settlement when it was known as Wifertorp (11th century). The village's name is linked to a certain Vidhfari, anglicised in Wivar. In the Domesday Book there is a mention of Wiveretorp where it was classed as very small and had depreciated in value from 1066 to 1086. Same male's name as in Wiverton (Nottingham) and in the Vierville (Wiarevilla 1158), Virville (Wivarevilla v. 1210) and Viertot of Normandy which appears to come from Old Scandinavian; which means that Weaverthorpe translates as the farm or settlement of the male name Vidhfari or Wivar.

After the Norman conquest, it was held by the Archbishop of York under Michael FitzHerbert. In the 12th century the church of St Andrew was granted to Nostell Priory until 1268. Lucy, daughter of Piers FitzHerbert, married Sir William de Ros of Helmsley-in-Holderness [alias Hamlake] (died c. 1264) who acquired the manor of 'Wyverthorp'. In about 1271 the manor was acquired by William de Brewes, Baron Braose of Gower, on his marriage with Mary de Ros.

From the mediaeval era until the 19th century Weaverthorpe was part of the Wapentake of Buckrose. Historically part of the East Riding of Yorkshire, from 1894 it was in the Driffield Rural District, then moving to the Norton Rural District in 1935. In 1974 it became part of the county of North Yorkshire. From 1974 to 2023 it was part of the district of Ryedale, it is now administered by the unitary North Yorkshire Council.

During the Second World War, MI6 secretly installed a new type of direction finding station in a field just south of the village, it consisted of an underground metal tank with an aerial protruding above rotated by the operator inside the tank. The station was used to find the locations of German secret service radio stations and their spies in Europe.

=== Church of St Andrew ===
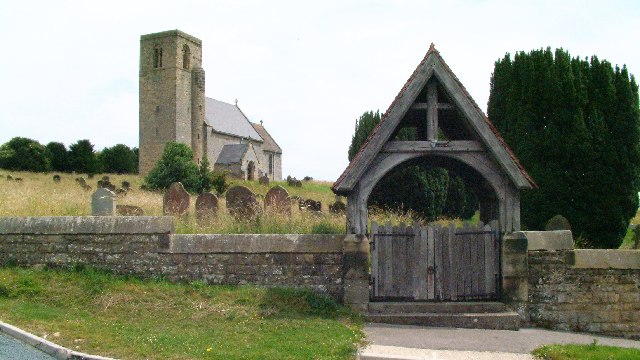
The church of St Andrew, Weaverthorpe

The tower is reputed to be a mix of late Saxon and Norman in construction. The chancel is separated from the nave by a Norman arch. The font is probably Norman. Above the south door of the nave is a sun-dial, with a part-illegible fragment of an inscription in Saxon characters, claimed as reading: " In honore Sancti andre - Herbert W.... Hoc Monasterium ". It has been claimed as a memorial to Herbert de Winchester (died 1120/1130) who built the church. Herbert of Winchester was chamberlain to King Henry I. His son William FitzHerbert was granted by King John, the lands of "Launsborough, Collerthorpe, Wyderthorpe, Holperthorpe and the two Lottum". The unexplained reference to "ecclesiam de Clera[m]" in the charter of King Stephen relating to "Wiverthorpe", might refer to a chapel attached to a local manor house.

A Victorian benefactor of Weaverthorpe's St Andrew's church was local landowner Sir Tatton Sykes, 5th Baronet. He paid for 18 rural churches to be built, repaired or rebuilt in the East and North Yorkshire areas, but mainly in the Wolds. St Andrew's church was restored by G E Street with "lavish furnishings and decorated roofs". The Yorkshire Post described the church as boasting some impressive stained glass windows. The church was listed as Grade I in October 1966.

== Population ==
Population of Weaverthorpe 1801–2021
	1801	1811	1821	1831	1841	1851	1861	1871	1881	1891	1901	1911	1921	1931	1951	1961	1971	1981	1991	2001	2011	2015	2021
Population	182	276	334	403	547	640	601	666	643	540	430	380	341	343	376	298	274	260	293	347	349	350‡	359
Households	31	51	72	78	102	126	132	137	129	134	100	93	98	96	107	94	90	91	103	124	150	N/A	146

‡ Estimated.

== Geography ==
The village sits in the Great Wold Valley and the waters of the winterbourne stream the Gypsey Race flow alongside the main street in the village. The waters of the Gypsey Race have carved a small valley out of the surrounding chalk. This has left small plateaus like the one that the Church of St Andrew is perched on as it overlooks the village.

The village is served by unclassified roads and lies 3.1 miles (5 km) south of the A64 road at Sherburn.

There was a railway station on the York to Scarborough Line at Sherburn which was called Weaverthorpe. It had been renamed from Sherburn to Wykeham and then renamed again to Weaverthorpe. This was to avoid confusion over place names (as there was a Wykeham station on the Forge Valley Line between Pickering and Seamer).

== Media ==
Television signals in the village are received from the local relay transmitter which is transmitted via the Belmont transmitter with signals cannot be received from either the Emley Moor and Bilsdale transmitters.

Local radio stations are BBC Radio York on 103.7 FM, Greatest Hits Radio York and North Yorkshire on 104.7 FM, and Coast & County Radio on 97.4 FM.

The village is served the local newspaper, Gazette and Herald.

== See also ==
- Listed buildings in Weaverthorpe
