= Listed buildings in Weaverthorpe =

Weaverthorpe is a civil parish in the county of North Yorkshire, England. It contains seven listed buildings that are recorded in the National Heritage List for England. Of these, one is listed at Grade I, the highest of the three grades, and the others are at Grade II, the lowest grade. The parish contains the village of Weaverthorpe and the surrounding countryside. The listed buildings consist of a church, items in the churchyard, houses and farmhouses, and a war memorial.

== Key ==
Grade	Criteria
I	Buildings of exceptional interest, sometimes considered to be internationally important
II	Buildings of national importance and special interest

== Buildings ==
Name and location	Photograph	Date	Notes	Grade
Church of St Andrew; 54.12672°N 0.52227°W		12th century	The church has been altered and extended through the centuries, including a restoration and alterations by G. E. Street in 1870–72. It is built in sandstone on a chamfered plinth, and has a tile roof. The church consists of a nave, a south porch, a chancel, and a west tower with a semicircular southeast stair turret. The tower is Norman, and has four stages, slit openings, string courses, twin round-arched bell openings separated by a column with a cushion capital, and a plain parapet. The porch is gabled, and has a pointed arch, a double-chamfered surround and a hood mould, and above the square-headed doorway is a semicircular tympanum containing a sundial and an inscription.	I
Effigy south of the Church of St Andrew; 54.12665°N 0.52242°W	—	Mid-14th century	The effigy and grave slab in the churchyard to the south of the porch are in stone. They consist of a recumbent figure with clasped hands, dressed in long garments of folded drapery, with the head resting on a shaped pillow.	II
Rarey Farmhouse and wall 54.12453°N 0.52100°W	—	Late 18th century	The farmhouse, which was extended in 1849, is in red mottled brick, the extension is in orange mottled brick, and the roof is in pantile with gable coping and shaped kneelers. There are two storeys and three bays, and a two-bay extension to the right. The doorway has pilasters, a fanlight and a cornice, above which is an initialled datestone. The windows are sashes. The wall to the left is in red and plum brick with sandstone coping, it is about 1.5 metres (4 ft 11 in) in height, and is ramped up toward the house.	II
Dale Farm; 54.12431°N 0.52714°W	—	c. 1804	The farm buildings consist of a farmhouse, and farm buildings behind in three ranges round a roughly U-shaped courtyard. The farmhouse is in painted brick, with chalk at the rear, sandstone details, and a tile roof. There are two storeys and five bays, and a rear outshut. In the centre is a doorway, and the windows are sashes, all with wedge lintels, and on the attic are three blocked openings. The rear ranges are in brick and chalk, they have pantile roofs, and are mainly in a single storey.	II
Dotterel Cottage Farmhouse; 54.12873°N 0.53731°W	—	Early 19th century	The farmhouse is in mottled brick on a plinth, with red brick dressings and a slate roof. There are two storeys and three bays, and a rear extension. The central doorway has pilasters, a fanlight, and a bracketed hood. The windows are sashes, the window above the doorway with a round-arched head. All the windows have quoined surrounds and cambered arches.	II
Lychgate, wall and gate, Church of St Andrew; 54.12648°N 0.52341°W		1874	The lychgate was designed by G. E. Street, and is timber framed on rusticated and coped sandstone walls, and has a tile roof. The entrance is arched, and along the sides are arcades with six round-headed arches. The wall is rock-faced, it is stepped to rise up the slope, and has gabled coping. The wrought iron footgate has square piers with gabled moulded caps and incised crosses. Over it is a round-arched overthrow with a lamp bracket and a cross finial.	II
War memorial 54.12439°N 0.52620°W		1922	The war memorial on the north side of Main Road is in white marble, and consists of a Latin cross with a Lee–Enfield rifle slung over one arm. It stands on a base of three steps, with two steps in a different material below. On the steps are inscriptions and the names of those lost in the two World Wars.	II
