= Eleanor of Champagne =

Countess of Vermandois (1102–1147)

Eléonore of Champagne
- Born: 1102
- Died: 1147 (aged 44–45)
- Spouse: Ralph I, Count of Vermandois (m. 1125; sep. 1140)
- House: Blois
- Father: Stephen, Count of Blois
- Mother: Adela of Normandy

Eleanor of Blois or Champagne (French: Eléonore; 1102–1147) was a French noblewoman.

== Life ==
She was daughter of Stephen, Count of Blois and Adela of Normandy, daughter of William the Conqueror and Matilda of Flanders. Eleanor married Ralph I, Count of Vermandois.

Eleanor's marriage with Ralph was dissolved at the request of Eleanor of Aquitaine, whose sister, Petronilla of Aquitaine, was in love with Ralph. Ralph was ex-communicated, and the repudiation of his wife led to a war with Theobald II of Champagne, who was Eleanor's brother. The war lasted two years (1142–1144) and ended with the occupation of Champagne by the royal army. Eleanor died in 1147.
