= Adela of Normandy =

Countess of Blois from 1089 to 1102

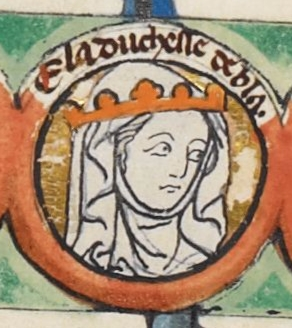
- Miniature of Adela in a 13th-century genealogy

Countess of Blois
- Tenure: 1089 – 19 May 1102

Regent of Blois
- Regency: 1102–1120
- Count: Theobald IV
- Born: c. 1067; Duchy of Normandy
- Died: 8 March 1137 (aged 69–70); Marcigny-sur-Loire, Kingdom of France
- Spouse: Stephen II, Count of Blois
- Issue more...: William, Count of Sully; Theobald II, Count of Champagne; Stephen, King of England; Agnes, Lady of Le Puiset; Henry, Bishop of Winchester; Eleanor, Countess of Vermandois
- House: Normandy
- Father: William the Conqueror
- Mother: Matilda of Flanders
- Religion: Roman Catholicism

Adela of Normandy, of Blois, or of England (c. 1067 – 8 March 1137), also known as Saint Adela in the Catholic Church, was a daughter of William the Conqueror and Matilda of Flanders. She later became the countess of Blois, Chartres, and Meaux by marriage to Stephen II of Blois. Her husband greatly benefited from the increased social status and prestige that came with a marriage into such a wealthy and powerful family. She was regent of Blois during the absence of her spouse in 1096–1100 and 1101–02, and during the minority of her son from 1102 until 1120. Her marriage also laid the groundwork for a period of extended strife in the Anglo Norman lands. Adela was the mother of King Stephen of England whose taking of the throne in preference to her niece Empress Matilda led to the civil war known as The Anarchy.

== Early life ==
It is generally believed that Adela was born between 1066 and 1070 after her father's accession to the English throne. She was the youngest daughter of William the Conqueror. Her royal blood marked her as noble in the eyes of her peers. She was the favourite sister of King Henry I of England and they were probably the youngest children of the Conqueror. Adela was a high-spirited and educated woman with a knowledge of Latin. As Adela's parents both travelled around Normandy, she likely spent much time at and was educated at a monastery, probably the Abbey of Sainte-Trinité, Caen. She had three older brothers and one younger, and thus she would not inherit her father's honours; however her bloodline would be a valuable asset in marriage.

Adela married Stephen Henry, son and heir to the count of Blois, between 1080 and 1083, around her fifteenth birthday. They were married at Chartres Cathedral. This marriage created a strong familial alliance, linking the two most powerful families in Northern France. Stephen was nearly twenty years her senior. During the fifteen years of their marriage, they had six or eight children who survived infancy.

Stephen inherited Blois, Chartres, and Meaux upon his father's death in 1089, as well as lands and right in parts of Berry and Burgundy. The Thibaudian dynasty had other possessions east of Paris, and by the end of Adela's life these were coalescing into the county of Champagne. While Theobald IV takes most of the credit for the emergence of that principality, Adela helped lay its foundations. Adela and her husband had a relationship based on trust and mutual respect, if not affection, and they made decisions together. She swore, for instance, to bind herself and her husband to protect the bishop of Chartres, then in a dispute with the king of France.

== First regency ==
Stephen-Henry joined the First Crusade in 1096, along with his brother-in-law Robert Curthose. Adela acted as regent for her husband during his extended absence as a leader of the First Crusade (1095–1098) as well as during his second expedition in 1101. Stephen's letters to Adela form a uniquely intimate insight into the experiences of the Crusade's leaders and show that he trusted Adela to rule as regent while he was on crusade.

Adela's regency included granting charters such as the right to build new churches to monks, as well as other charters. Adela also worked with Ivo of Chartres at various points, exchanging letters throughout her regency to discuss matters such as the control of misbehaving nuns and larger issues such as disputes about sworn oaths. While regent, Adela would continue to tour their lands, settling disputes, promoting economic growth, and even commanding knights to go to battle with the king. This role was not unique, however, as during the crusades it was common for noble women to take upon themselves the duties of their male counterparts.

The Count of Blois returned to France in 1100 bringing with him several cartloads of maps, jewels, and other treasures, which he deposited at Chartres. According to Orderic Vitalis, when Stephen-Henry abandoned the First Crusade returning to France in ignominy, "Adela constantly berated him, even during their love-making", urging him to return to the Holy Land. He was under an obligation to the pope for agreements made years earlier and returned to Antioch to participate in the crusade of 1101. Ultimately, he was killed in a last stand after the Battle of Ramla in 1102. The image of Adela persuading her ease-loving husband to redeem his reputation through action has proved popular with historians attempting to account for the crusader motivations.

== Second regency ==
Adela continued to act as regent after her husband's death and through her son Thibaud's early rule until her retirement in 1120. Even after Thibaud came of age and no longer needed a regent, Adela continued to issue charters and act as co-ruler of many parts of their land. Adela did not secure a marriage alliance for Thibaud, who did not get married until after Adela's retirement, which helped to maintain her power and influence over both her son and her lands.

Adela, a devout Benedictine sympathiser, employed several high-ranking tutors to educate her children. Her youngest son, Henry, was conceived during the single year Stephen was in France between crusading duties. At two years of age Henry was pledged to the Church at Cluny Abbey, Saône-et-Loire, France, as an oblate child, that is, he was dedicated to the service of God, according to medieval practice. Henry went on to be appointed Abbot of Glastonbury and Bishop of Winchester. In that capacity, he sponsored hundreds of constructions including bridges, canals, palaces, forts, castles, and whole villages. In addition, Bishop Henry built dozens of abbeys and chapels and sponsored books including the treasured Winchester Bible.

In 1105, after St Anselm visited her during a sickness, she was responsible for communicating the archbishop's earnestness in threatening excommunication to her brother Henry I. Orderic Vitalis praises her as a "wise and spirited woman" who ably governed her husband's estates and her own. Adela's power and interests are reflected in letters collected, they demonstrate her religiosity and intellect. In one such letter to the public from 1104, Adela gifts a monastery a portion of land with all the wildlife inhabiting it, but she reserves the power to pass judgement upon crimes committed in the area. She also makes sure to mark her place as a woman, tying herself to not only her late husband but her sons.

Adela quarrelled with her eldest son William and despite his previously being named heir-designate, she appointed his younger brother Theobald to replace him as heir in 1107. Another son, Stephen of Blois, moved to London in 1111 to join the court of his uncle, King Henry I (Beauclerc), and became his favourite. Upon Beauclerc's death in Normandy (1135), Stephen seized the English throne from Holy Roman Empress Dowager Matilda, King Henry I's daughter, whom the monarch had named as his successor. This started a protracted civil war in England that lasted nearly twenty years.

== Retirement ==
Adela retired to the monastery at Marcigny, in 1120, where she became a nun. Though she might have considered retiring to a monastery in Normandy where members of her family, including sisters and nieces, may have already been living, Adela was drawn to and chose the larger, more prestigious monastery at Marcigny near her son Henry at Cluny Abbey. Adela might have served as abbess of the community, though this is not certain. She continued to interact and communicate with her children and the ecclesiastical leaders of lands that she had once ruled, maintaining her influence over the region. In one instance, Adela sent letters to both her son Thibaud and Geoffrey, bishop of Chartres, reminding them of her settlement of a monastic case. In these letters she reminds her son how his father and she felt about alms gifting to monasteries.

Later that same year, her daughter Lucia-Mahaut drowned in the wreck of the White Ship alongside her husband. Adela lived long enough to see her son Stephen on the English throne, though any response she may have had to this development has been lost. She likely took pride in the ascension of her youngest child, Henry of Blois, to the bishopric of Winchester in 1129. After her death in 1137 at Marcigny, prayers were offered at a number of churches that she had endowed personally or had recognized at some point during her life.

== Issue ==
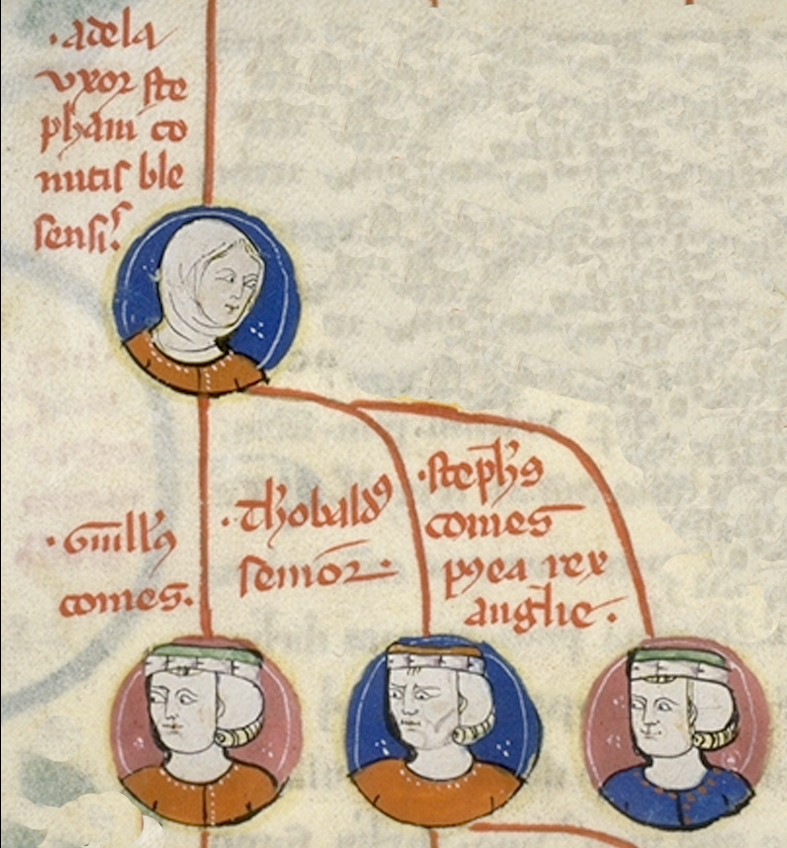
Adela and three of her sons, William, Theobald and Stephen, 14th century

Adela and Stephen's children are listed here in probable birth order. Their birth order is uncertain.

- William, Count of Sully
- Theobald II, Count of Champagne
- Adela, married Milo II of Montlhéry (Note: Kimberly A. LoPrete states Milo bigamously married an unnamed daughter of Adela, but the marriage was annulled.)
- Stephen, King of England
- Matilda, married Richard d'Avranches, 2nd Earl of Chester. Both drowned on 25 November 1120 in the White Ship disaster.
- Agnes, married Hugh III of Le Puiset and were parents to Hugh de Puiset, Bishop of Durham.
- Alix, married Renaud III of Joigny and had issue.
- Henry, Bishop of Winchester, an oblate child raised at Cluny Abbey in Saône-et-Loire, France.
- Eleanor, married Ralph I, Count of Vermandois; they were divorced in 1142.

Some of the daughters may have been step-daughters of Adela, rather than biological children. It is known that Adela had five biological sons and may have had three or more daughters, though not all of the daughters were necessarily Adela's biological children. The daughters are not mentioned by name during their youth, only appearing when they reached marriageable age and played an important part in building alliances.

== Legacy ==
Adela is a saint in the Roman Catholic church. Her feast day is 24 February.
