= Stephen, Count of Blois =

Count of Blois from 1089 to 1102

Stephen
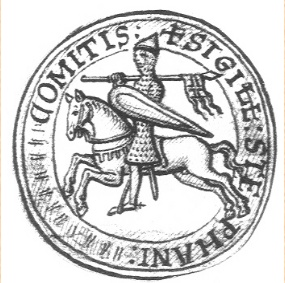
- Seal of Stephen
- Tenure: 1089–1102
- Predecessor: Theobald III, Count of Blois
- Successor: Theobald IV, Count of Blois
- Born: c. 1045; Blois, Kingdom of France
- Died: 19 May 1102 (aged 56–57); Ramla, Kingdom of Jerusalem
- Noble family: Blois
- Spouse: Adela of Normandy
- Issue more...: William, Count of Sully; Theobald II, Count of Champagne; Stephen, King of England; Agnes, Lady of Le Puiset; Henry, Bishop of Winchester; Eleanor, Countess of Vermandois
- Father: Theobald III, Count of Blois
- Mother: Garsinde du Maine

Stephen Henry (French: Étienne Henri, Old French: Estienne Henri; c. 1045 – 19 May 1102) was the count of Blois and Chartres. He led an army during the First Crusade, was at the surrender of the city of Nicaea, and directed the siege of Antioch. Returning home without fulfilling his crusader vows, Stephen joined the crusade of 1101. Making his way to Jerusalem, he fought in the Second Battle of Ramla, where he was captured and later executed.

== Life ==
Stephen was the son of Theobald III, count of Blois, and Gersent of Le Mans. He is first mentioned as approaching William the Conqueror to ask for and receive the hand of his daughter Adela of Normandy. In 1089, upon the death of his father, Stephen became the Count of Blois and Chartres, although Theobald had given him the administration of those holdings in 1074.

Stephen was one of the leaders of the First Crusade, leading one of the major armies of the crusade and often writing enthusiastic letters to his wife about the crusade's progress. Present at the Siege of Nicaea, he wrote that the defenders surrendered out of fear of the siege towers.

At some point either before or at the beginning of the Siege of Antioch in October 1097, he was chosen as 'leader' of the army, a function that seems to not have gone much beyond presiding over the assemblies of the leaders as well as provisioning and housekeeping duties for the armies. Stephen retreated from the siege on 2 June 1098, the day before the capture of the city, leaving his comrades behind in a difficult situation, as a superior Turkish army under Kerbogha was approaching. Critically, on the way back to the West he met the Byzantine emperor Alexios I Komnenos, who was marching with an army to assist the crusaders, and persuaded him of the futility of his expedition.

Alexios's consequent decision to turn around contributed to the ongoing suspicion of the crusaders that the Byzantines were not to be trusted and to the later conflicts between crusaders and Byzantium. Having returned with unfulfilled vows and the ignominy of abandoning his comrades, Stephen was in disgrace. His wife Adela pleaded with him to make a second pilgrimage, and he joined the subsequent Crusade of 1101 in the company of others who had also returned home prematurely.

He participated in the disastrous campaign in Anatolia to free Bohemond from prison, then sailed from Constantinople to St Simeon and thence Jerusalem, finally fulfilling his vows. In 1102, already on his way back home, he was persuaded by King Baldwin of Jerusalem to fight in the Second Battle of Ramla against the Fatimids. He was taken prisoner and executed, probably in Ascalon on 19 May.

== Family ==
Stephen married Adela of Normandy, a daughter of William the Conqueror, around 1090 in Chartres. Their children were:

1. William, Count of Sully (c. 1085 – c. 1150)
2. Theobald II, Count of Champagne (1090–1152)
3. Adela, married Milo II of Montlhéry (Note: Kimberly A. LoPrete states Milo bigamously married an unnamed daughter of Adela, but the marriage was annulled.)
4. Stephen, King of England (1092 or 1096 – 1154) (reign: 1135 - 1154)
5. Matilda, married Richard d'Avranches, 2nd Earl of Chester. Both drowned on 25 November 1120 in the White Ship disaster.
6. Agnes, married Hugh III of Le Puiset and were parents to Hugh de Puiset, Bishop of Durham.
7. Alix (c. 1095 – 1145) married Renaud III of Joigny (d. 1134) and had issue.
8. Henry, Bishop of Winchester (c. 1096 – 1171)
9. Eleanor (died 1147) married Ralph I, Count of Vermandois; they were divorced in 1142.

A late 14th century source gives Stephen an illegitimate daughter Emma, wife of Herbert of Winchester and mother of William of York, archbishop of York, but recent research suggests a different parentage for her.

== Sources ==
- Brundage, James A. (1960). "An Errant Crusader: Stephen of Blois". Traditio. 16: 380–395. doi:10.1017/S0362152900006139. JSTOR 27830413. S2CID 142071410.
- Claster, Jill N. (2009). Sacred Violence: The European Crusades to the Middle East, 1095-1396. University of Toronto Press.
- Davis, Ralph H. C. (1967). King Stephen, 1135–1154. University of California Press. ISBN 978-0582040007.
- Evergates, Theodore, ed. (1999). Aristocratic Women in Medieval France. University of Pennsylvania Press.
- Evergates, Theodore (2007). The Aristocracy in the County of Champagne, 1100–1300. University of Pennsylvania Press.
- Evergates, Theodore (2016). Henry the Liberal: Count of Champagne, 1127–1181. University of Pennsylvania Press.
- Munro, D. Carleton (1902). Letters of the crusaders. Translations and reprints from the original sources of European history. Dept. of history of the University of Pennsylvania.
- Rogers, Randall (2002). Latin Siege Warfare in the Twelfth Century. Oxford University Press.
- Tyerman, Christopher (2006). God's war: a new history of the Crusades. Harvard University Press. ISBN 9780674023871.

Stephen, Count of Blois House of Blois Born: c. 1045 Died: 19 May 1102
Preceded by: Theobald III	Count of Blois; 1089–1102	Succeeded by: William the Simple
