= Anseau of Garlande =

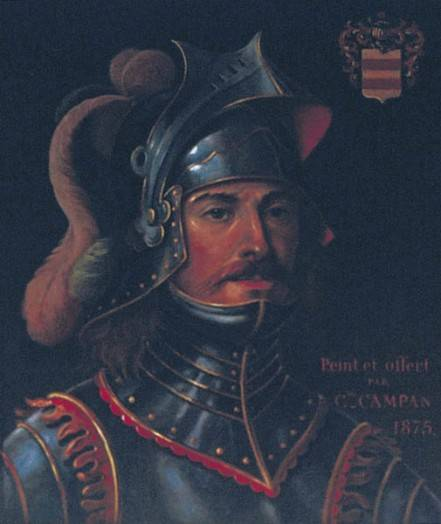
Anseau of Garlande

Anseau (also Anselm) de Garlande (1069–1118), son of Guillaume I de Garlande and his wife Havoise, grandson of Adam de Garlande. His titles included: Count of Rochefort-en-Yvelines, Seigneur of Gournay-sur-Marne, and Pontault and Berchères. De Garlande served as seneschal of France under Louis VI from 1108 to 1118. It is unclear when Anseau was counted, although it is likely that he assumed the title after his brother-in-law Guy II the Red died in 1108.

His appointment as seneschal was disputed by Fulk V, Count of Anjou, who considered the position as belonging to his family. The issue was resolved through the intervention of Amaury III of Montfort (his future son-in-law), Geoffrey of Vendôme and Raoul de Boisgency.

Legend has it that in 1115, Anseau and his niece Yolande were crossing the forest Roissy-en-Brie on horseback when a boar attacked them. They were rescued by a clown and a peasant who were rewarded for their bravery by a plot of land in the forest.

Anseau first married a daughter (name unknown) of Guichard de Beaujeu III and Lucienne de Rochefort. His second wife was Beatrice of Montlhéry, daughter of Guy I of Montlhéry and Hodierna of Gometz. Anseau and Beatrice had one daughter: Agnes (Garlande) de Monfort. Anseau was killed in 1118 by a spear of his grand nephew, Hugh III of Le Puiset, during the third siege of the castle of Puiset in Beauce.

== Sources ==
- Never, François, A Brief History of The Normans, Howard Curtis, translator, Constable & Robinson, Ltd., London, 2008
- La Monte, John L., The Lords of Le Puiset on the Crusades, Speculum, 1942
- Orderic Vitalis, The Ecclesiastical History of England and Normandy, trans. Thomas Forester, Vol. III, Henry G. Bohn, London, 1854
- Anselm de Guibours, Histoire généalogique et chronologique de la maison royale de France des Pairs, Grands officiers de la couronne et de la Maison du roi; et des grands barons. Tome sixième, Paris, 1730
- Detlev Schwennicke, Europäische Stammtafeln: Stammtafeln zur Geschichte der Europäischen Staaten, Neue Folge, Band III Teilband 4 (Marburg, Germany: J. A. Stargardt, 1989), Tafel 642
