= William of York =

Archbishop of York (1141–1147, 1153–1154)

Saint William
- Archbishop of York
- Elected: January 1141; 20 December 1153
- Installed: 1141
- Term ended: Deprived 1147; 8 June 1154
- Predecessor: Henry de Sully; Henry Murdac
- Successor: Henry Murdac; Roger de Pont L'Évêque
- Other post: Treasurer of York

Orders
- Consecration: 26 September 1143

Personal details
- Born: Late 11th century
- Died: 8 June 1154 York, Kingdom of England
- Buried: York Minster
- Parents: Herbert of Winchester; Emma

Sainthood
- Feast day: 8 June
- Venerated in: Roman Catholic Church; Anglicanism
- Canonized: 18 March 1226; Rome by Pope Honorious III
- Shrines: York Minster

William of York (late 11th century – 8 June 1154) (Note: also known as William FitzHerbert, William I FitzHerbert and William of Thwayt) was an English priest and twice Archbishop of York, before and after a rival, Henry Murdac. He was thought to be related to King Stephen of England, who helped to secure his election to the province after several candidates had failed to gain papal confirmation. William faced opposition from the Cistercians, who, after the election of the Cistercian Pope Eugene III, had William deposed in favour of a Cistercian, Murdac. From 1147 until 1153, William worked to be restored to York, which he achieved after the deaths of Murdac and Eugene III. He did not hold the province long, dying shortly after his return, allegedly from poison in the chalice he used to celebrate Mass. Miracles were reported at his tomb from 1177. He was canonised in 1226.

== Early life ==
Born William fitzHerbert in York, William was the son of Herbert of Winchester, or Herbert fitzAlberic, chancellor and treasurer of King Henry I. Most sources say his mother was Emma, half-sister of King Stephen and Henry of Blois, Bishop of Winchester, and that she was an illegitimate daughter of Stephen II, Count of Blois, Stephen's father. New research, however, suggests that Emma may have been a daughter of Hunger fitzOdin, who held lands in Dorset in the Domesday survey. William was born sometime before the 1090s, but the date is unknown.

William held the prebendary of Weighton in the diocese of Yorkshire between 27 June 1109 and 24 February 1114. Sometime between 1109 and 1114 he was appointed Treasurer of York. He was also appointed archdeacon of the East Riding of Yorkshire at an unknown date between 1125 and 1133. The influence of his rich and powerful father, who had many landholdings in Yorkshire, may have been of benefit in gaining him these offices at a relatively early age. William apparently held both of these offices until he was elected Archbishop. Serving under Archbishop Thurstan of York, William became involved in Thurstan's dispute with King Henry I after Henry demanded that the Archbishops of York accept subordination to the Archbishops of Canterbury. William accompanied Thurstan into exile in Europe and on embassies to the papal court. Reconciliation with Henry allowed a return to York in 1121. A papal ruling in favour of the independence of the Archbishops of York was finally delivered in 1127.

== Election problems ==
In January 1141, William was elected Archbishop of York. Originally, the cathedral chapter of York had elected Waltheof in 1140, but that election was set aside, as one of Waltheof's supporters had made an uncanonical gift (bribe) to secure Waltheof's election. Then Henry of Blois tried to secure the see for Henry de Sully, another nephew of Stephen and Henry's. Sully's election was opposed by Pope Innocent II, who refused to confirm him as Archbishop while he remained Abbot of Fécamp. Only at a third election in January 1141 was William chosen. Whether he had been a candidate in the previous two elections is unknown.

The election was opposed by the Cistercian monasteries of Yorkshire and by the archdeacons of York. The Cistercians opposed on the grounds that the Second Lateran Council in 1139 had given the religious houses of a diocese the right to participate in electing the bishop. Theobald of Bec, the Archbishop of Canterbury, refused to recognise William's election due to allegations of simony (acquisition of church positions by bribery), and of interference by King Stephen. In 1143, Pope Innocent II ruled that William could be confirmed in office if he swore under oath that the allegations were false. After he swore the oath, Henry of Blois, who was also papal legate, found William innocent, and he was consecrated as archbishop on 26 September 1143.

== First archiepiscopate and deposition ==
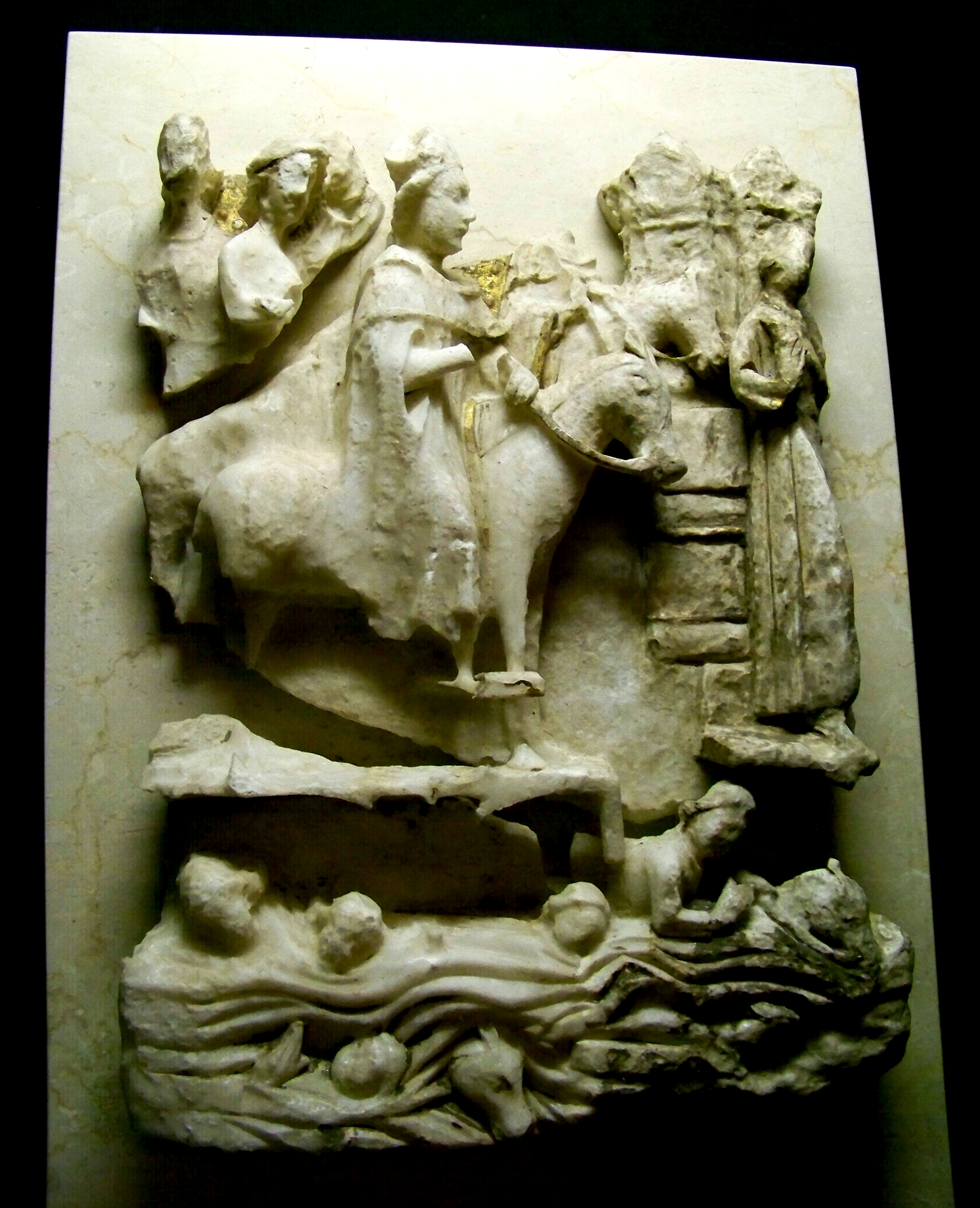
Carved plaque. William of York crosses the River Ouse; the Ouse bridge collapses, but no one is killed.

As archbishop, William undertook several ecclesiastical reforms and became popular with the people of York. However, he still needed a pallium, the sign of an archbishop's authority from the Pope, which he had not yet received. The Cistercians, who were still adamantly opposed to his being archbishop, were determined to prevent his receiving it. William travelled to Rome in an attempt to obtain the pallium. The election of Pope Eugene III, a Cistercian, in 1145, was a setback for his cause. Bernard of Clairvaux, the famous Cistercian abbot and religious leader, exerted all his influence to ensure William's suspension, sending a series of complaints to the new Pope that William had been intruded by secular powers into the see, that he was oppressing the Cistercian monasteries and that he had irregularly appointed William of St. Barbara as Dean of York. In the winter of 1145–1146, Eugene re-examined the case, declared that William had not been validly consecrated, and suspended him from office. William was required to obtain an in-person refutation of the old charges by William of St Barbara, by then the Bishop of Durham.

While awaiting the final decision in his case, William took up residence with one of his friends, Roger II, King of Sicily. Hearing of his suspension, some of William's supporters in York launched a damaging attack on Fountains Abbey, which destroyed many of the buildings. William was formally deposed by Eugene in early 1147, and the deposition was confirmed at the Council of Reims on 21 March 1148. Another election to York was held, and the candidates included Hilary of Chichester, who was the king's candidate, and Henry Murdac, the Cistercian abbot of Fountains Abbey. Murdac's supporters included the Cistercians and most of the clergy of the diocese, including William's former ally, William of St Barbara. Both sides appealed to the Pope, and the Pope confirmed Murdac as the successful candidate. William then returned to Winchester, the city he had left 40 years earlier to begin his career in York.

== Second archiepiscopate ==
King Stephen refused to accept William's deposition and the appointment of Murdac and prevented Murdac from taking up residence in York. Stephen probably wished to trade recognition of Murdac for support for his son Eustace, whose coronation as his successor he was trying to secure during his own lifetime, to defeat rival claims to the throne by Henry of Anjou. (Note: Henry eventually became King Henry II of England after the death of Eustace and Stephen.) Within a few years, both Murdac and the Pope had died, and William travelled to Rome to plead with the new Anastasius IV for restoration to office. The Pope concurred, and William's reappointment was confirmed on 20 December 1153. On his return to York, while crossing the Ouse Bridge in York in triumphal procession, the bridge collapsed, but no one was killed.

== Death and sainthood ==
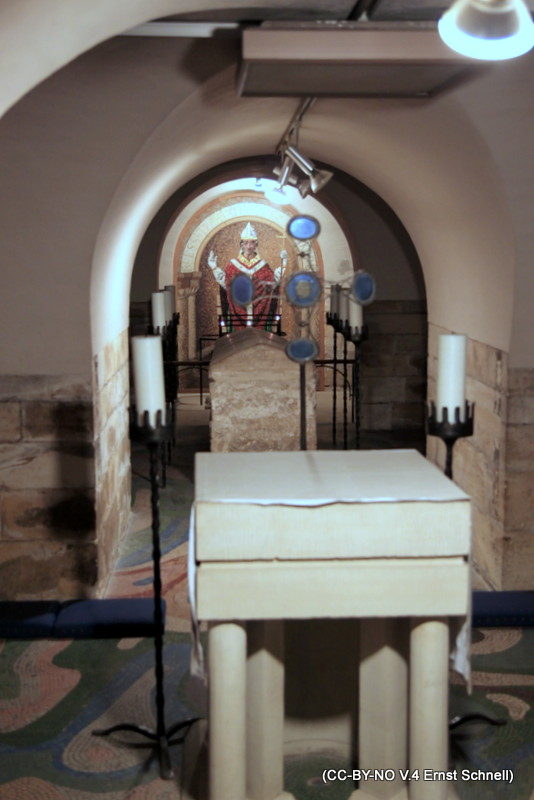
The sarcophagus of William between an altar and a mural of his image in the crypt of York Minster

After less than a month back in York, William died on 8 June 1154, allegedly due to poison administered in the chalice at Mass. One of William's clerks accused Osbert de Bayeux, an archdeacon of York, of the murder, and Osbert was summoned before the king to be tried at the royal court. King Stephen died before the trial could take place. William was buried in York Minster and within a few months of his death, miracles were attributed to his intervention and a sweet smell came from his tomb when it was damaged during a fire. Nor was the body decayed or burnt. Pope Honorius III then ordered an investigation into the miracles and canonized him in Rome in 1226.

William's feast day is marked on 8 June, the day of his death. Traditional iconography and windows often depict William's crossing of the Ouse; some iconography shows him crossing in a boat. William's coat of arms is blazoned: Or, seven mascles Gules, 3, 3 and 1. This actual shield at one time hung on the west wall of St Wilfrid's Church, Bognor Regis.

=== Chapel ===
A chapel to St William was built in York in the later 12th century. It was placed on the northern edge of the Ouse Bridge to mark a miracle associated with the collapse of the bridge when William returned to York in 1154. It remained as a functional chapel until 1550. The chapel was removed during the renovation of the bridge between 1810 and 1818.

=== Shrines ===
The earliest shrine to William in York Minster dates to the 1220s, in which William's sarcophagus was buried 10 inches (25 cm) into the floor and a shrine structure erected above it – this left the lid of the sarcophagus proud of the structure to be accessible to pilgrims. In 1284, Bishop Bek paid for the translation of William's body to a new shrine in the choir behind the high altar; no trace of the shrine has been recorded. A tomb shrine was built around 1330 on the site of William's original burial place in the eastern-most bay of the nave. The latest principal shrine was located near the Minster's High Altar was built in 1471–1472.

Shrines of St William
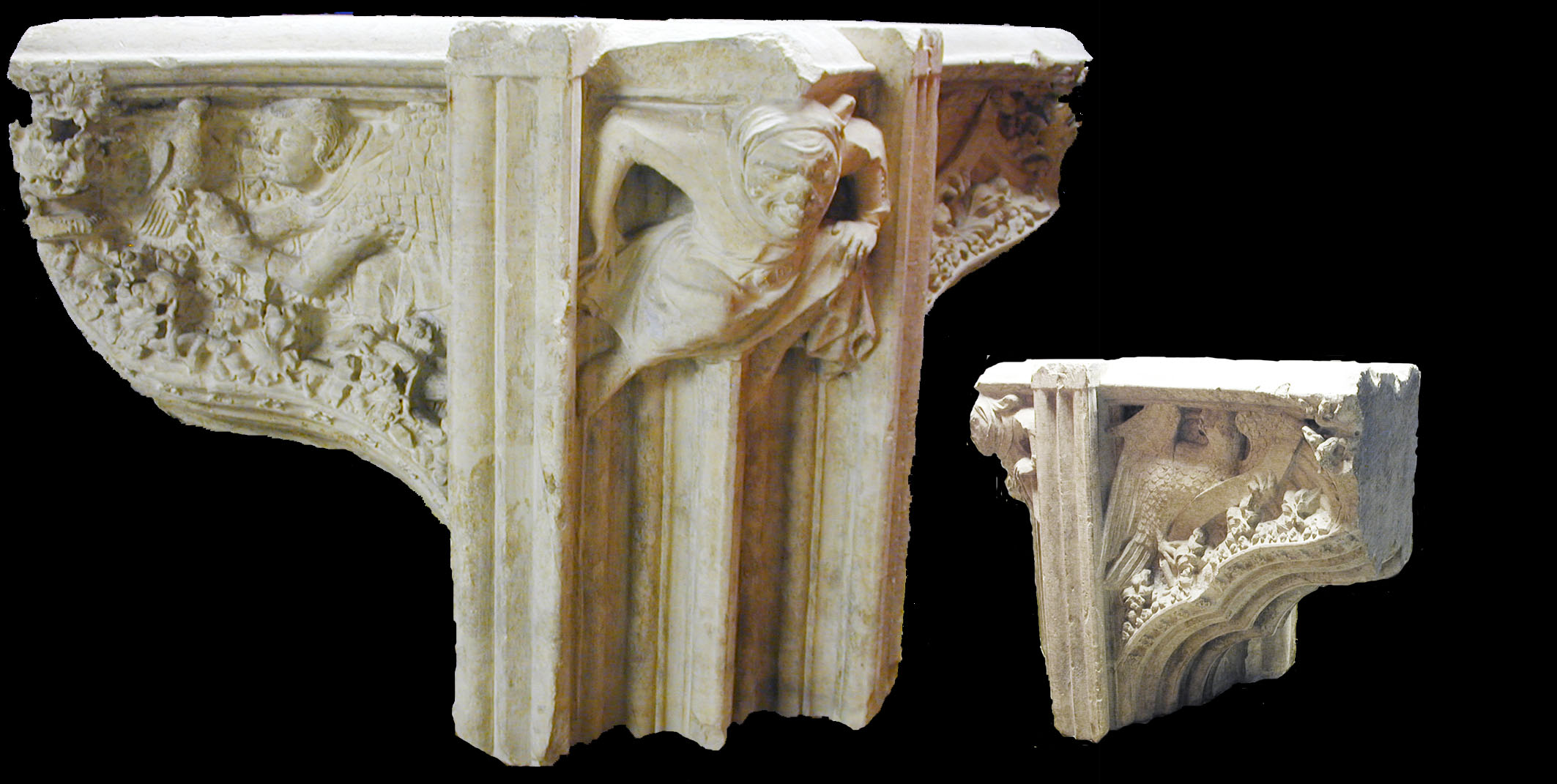
Corner fragment of the 14th-century tomb shrine of St William

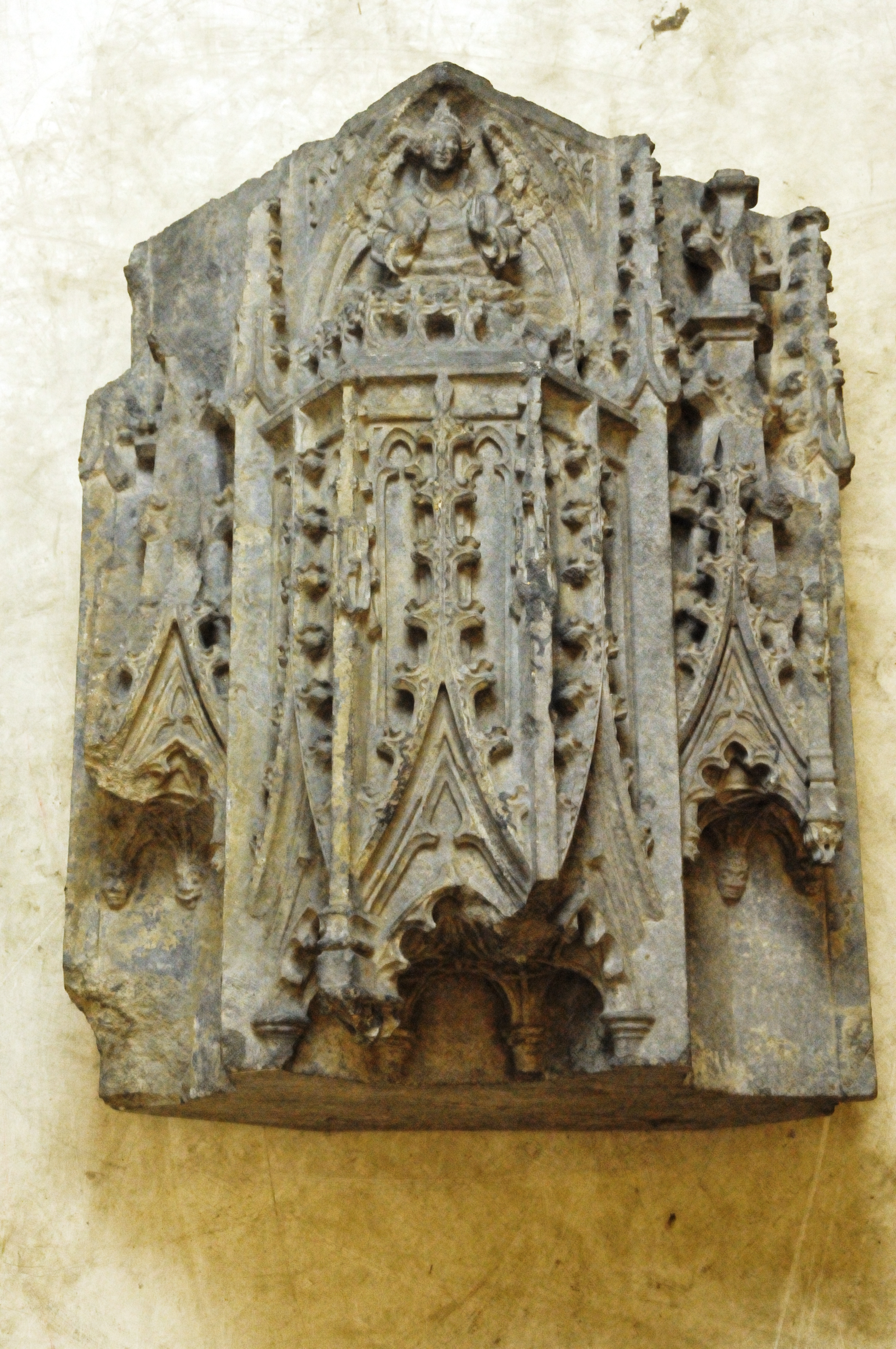
Pedestal fragment of the 15th-century principal shrine of St William

There is no evidence of large-scale pilgrimage to William's shrines. However, numerous panels from the stained glass window in the Minster depict petitioners and worshippers at the shrines. The upper face of William's sarcophagus has been worn smooth, probably from the hands of pilgrims touching it.

In 1541, the Privy Council ordered the demolition of all of the shrines in the York diocese. William's shrines were taken apart and buried at Precentor's Court. Fragments of the shrines were discovered during the 18th through 20th centuries. The sarcophagus containing William's remains was rediscovered in 1732 and again in 1968. His remains are now held in a shrine in the crypt of York Minster. Parts of the shrines are in the Yorkshire Museum. During celebrations of the 800th anniversary of William's canonisation in 2026, these pieces were put on display at York Minster alongside a digital recreation of the shrine.

== Citations ==
Catholic Church titles
Preceded by Thurstan	Archbishop of York; 1143–1147	Succeeded by Henry Murdac
Preceded by Henry Murdac	Archbishop of York; 1153–1154	Succeeded by Roger de Pont L'Évêque
