= Hugh III of Le Puiset =

French noble (died 1132)

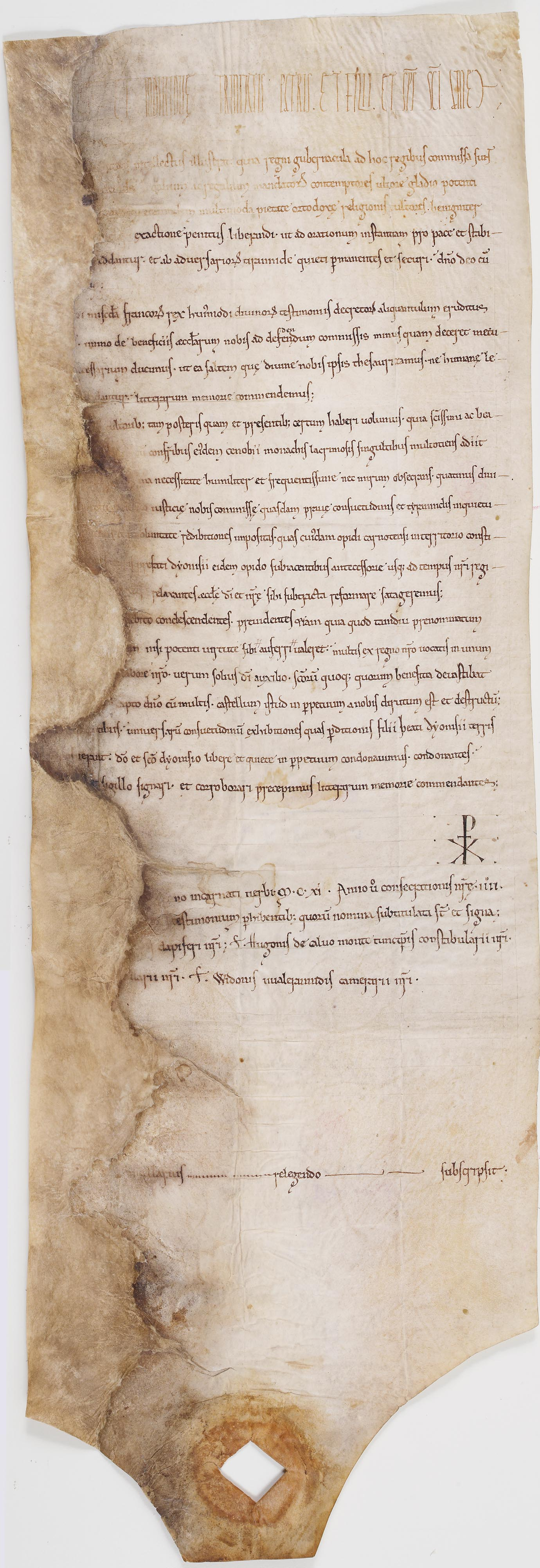
Charter by which Louis VI, having taking Hugh prisoner, abolished the customs he had imposed un lawfully on lands belonging to the Abbey of Saint-Denis

Hugh III, Seigneur of Le Puiset (French: Hugues III du Puiset) (d. 1132 in Palestine), son of Éverard III, Seigneur of Puiset and Viscount of Chartres, and Adelaide, Countess of Corbeil, was Count of Jaffa, Lord of Puiset and later Count of Corbel.

Hugh's father took part in the First Crusade and died in Palestine in 1099 while Hugh was still a child. His uncle Hugh II was regent of Puiset before going to the Holy Land in 1106, becoming Count of Jaffa (as Hugh I of Jaffa). Hugh was tutored by Theobald of Étampes, a 12th-century scholar and theologian who was one of the first lecturers at Oxford.

As Lord of Puiset, he oppressed and plundered neighbouring lands, sparing neither churches nor monasteries. With impunity and wanting to increase his fortune, he attacked the county of Chartres, which was then in the dowry of his future mother-in-law Adela of Normandy, mother of Theobald II, Count of Champagne. The latter tried to send troops subdue the turbulent vassal, but without success. He then appealed to King Louis VI. The king summoned a council in Melun, where the Archbishop of Sens and the bishops of Orleans and Chartres testified against Hugh. Since the charges were powerful, the king decided to intervene, but knowing that Hugh had a powerful army, he proceeded with caution.

In 1111, Louis summoned Hugh to his court, but the latter refrained from appearing and was condemned by default. Meanwhile, with the consent of the Abbey of Saint-Denis, he had a fortress built at Toury, close to Le Puiset, administered by his secretary Suger. When the work was finished, the royal host was summoned and laid siege to the Puiset fortress. Hugh was unable to resist, the castle was taken and set on fire, and the lord was captured and imprisoned at Château-Landon.

Shortly afterwards, his maternal uncle, Eudes, Count of Corbeil died, naming Hugh as his sole heir. He succeeded in negotiating the surrender of Corbeil to the king in exchange for his liberation. Taking advantage of a journey from the king to Flanders, he rebuilt an army and attacked Toury, aided by the lords of Montlhéry and Theobald II who were quarreling with the king. Warned, the King, who was not far from Paris, returned promptly and defeated the soldiers of Hugh under the walls of Toury. They fled but regrouped at Puiset, where they began to erect a new castle.

In 1118, the third and final siege of the Puiset castle occurred as Louis attacked again and Hugh found himself again imprisoned. During this siege, Hugh killed his great-uncle Anseau of Garlande.

In 1104, Hugh married Agnès of Blois (d. 1129), daughter of Stephen, Count of Blois, and Adela of Normandy (and so sister of Stephen, King of England). Hugh and Agnès had three children:

- Éverard IV, Viscount of Chartres
- Bouchard, Archdeacon at Orleans and Chancellor of the Bishop of Chartres
- Hugh de Puiset, Bishop of Durham.

Hugh III was eventually freed from imprisonment and went to fight in the Holy Land where he died in 1132.

== Sources ==
- Evergates, Theodore (2016). Henry the Liberal: Count of Champagne, 1127-1181. University of Pennsylvania Press.
- La Monte, John L. (January 1942). "The Lords of Le Puiset on the Crusades". Speculum. The University of Chicago Press.
