= Herbert of Winchester =

11th and 12th-century Anglo-Norman royal official

Herbert of Winchester (sometimes Herbert fitzAlberic) was an Anglo-Norman nobleman during the period following the Norman Conquest of England.

== Career ==
Herbert held land as an under-tenant of the Archbishop of York in the Domesday Survey of 1089. He held the office of chamberlain of the Winchester treasury during the reign of King William II of England, and the office of chancellor and treasurer under King Henry I. During William II's reign, Herbert became a tenant-in-chief, holding lands directly from the king. Herbert may have been a member of the clergy, although it is known that he was married.

== Marriage and family ==
Most sources state that Herbert married Emma, half-sister of King Stephen and Henry of Blois, Bishop of Winchester, and that she was an illegitimate daughter of Stephen II, Count of Blois, Stephen's father. New research, however, suggests that Emma might have been a daughter of Hunger fitzOdin, who held lands in Dorset in the Domesday survey.

Herbert was the father of Herbert and William. William later became Archbishop of York. The younger Herbert became chamberlain to King David I of Scotland around 1156.

== Death ==
Herbert was probably dead by 1129–1130, when the Pipe Roll of 1130 records his son as owing a fine for inheriting his father's lands, a fine totaling over 353 marks, perhaps as much as 500. However, there is no certain record of Herbert after 1111. he may be the same person as "H. the Chamberlain", who Abbot Suger of St Denis named as an attempted assassin of Henry I in 1118, and who was punished by the king for the attempt. Suger stated that the would-be assassin was a chamberlain whose name began with "H", and who had been close to the king and received great rewards from the king. Suger added that the king only blinded and castrated the man, which the abbot considered to be mild compared with the hanging that the man deserved. William of Malmesbury does not name the assassin either, but relates that he had custody of the royal treasury. The historian C. Warren Hollister first made the identification between "H." and Herbert, noting that there was only one chamberlain in King Henry I's reign who had a name beginning with "H". The main argument against the identification is the fact that most records indicate that Herbert remained in office until close to 1129 or 1130. However, charter evidence supports the inheritance of Herbert's lands by his son before 1121.
