= Henry Murdac =

Archbishop of York from 1147 to 1153

- Archbishop of York
- Elected: 1147
- Installed: January 1151
- Term ended: 14 October 1153
- Predecessor: William of York
- Successor: William of York
- Other post: Abbot of Fountains Abbey

Orders
- Consecration: 7 December 1147

Personal details
- Died: 14 October 1153 Beverley
- Buried: York Minster

Henry Murdac (died 1153) was abbot of Fountains Abbey and Archbishop of York in medieval England.

== Early life ==
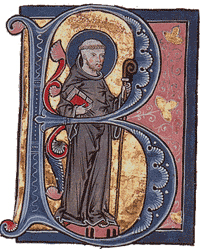
Henry became a Cistercian under the influence of Bernard of Clairvaux, shown here in a 13th-century illuminated manuscript.

Murdac was a native of Yorkshire. He was friendly with Archbishop Thurstan of York, who secured his promotion in the cathedral chapter of York Minster; however, Murdac resigned soon afterwards when Bernard of Clairvaux invited him to become a Cistercian monk at Clairvaux Abbey. He was a friend and companion there of the future Pope Eugene III. He was later appointed the first abbot of Vauclair Abbey in the diocese of Laon and in 1144 returned to Yorkshire to assume the abbacy at Fountains. Henry was a strict disciplinarian and a magnificent administrator, enforcing his rules by example, in living a life of great austerity and constantly wearing sackcloth next to his skin.

Murdac was also at the forefront of opposition to the appointment of William FitzHerbert to the see of York, by King Stephen of England. William, who was the king's nephew, was accused by some of simony and unchaste living; in a letter to Pope Innocent II, Bernard maintained that fitzHerbert was 'rotten from the soles of his feet to the crown of his head.' FitzHerbert was first suspended by the pope in 1147, then formally deposed at the Council of Rheims at the instigation of Pope Eugene III, like Murdac, a former monk of Clairvaux.

== Archbishop ==
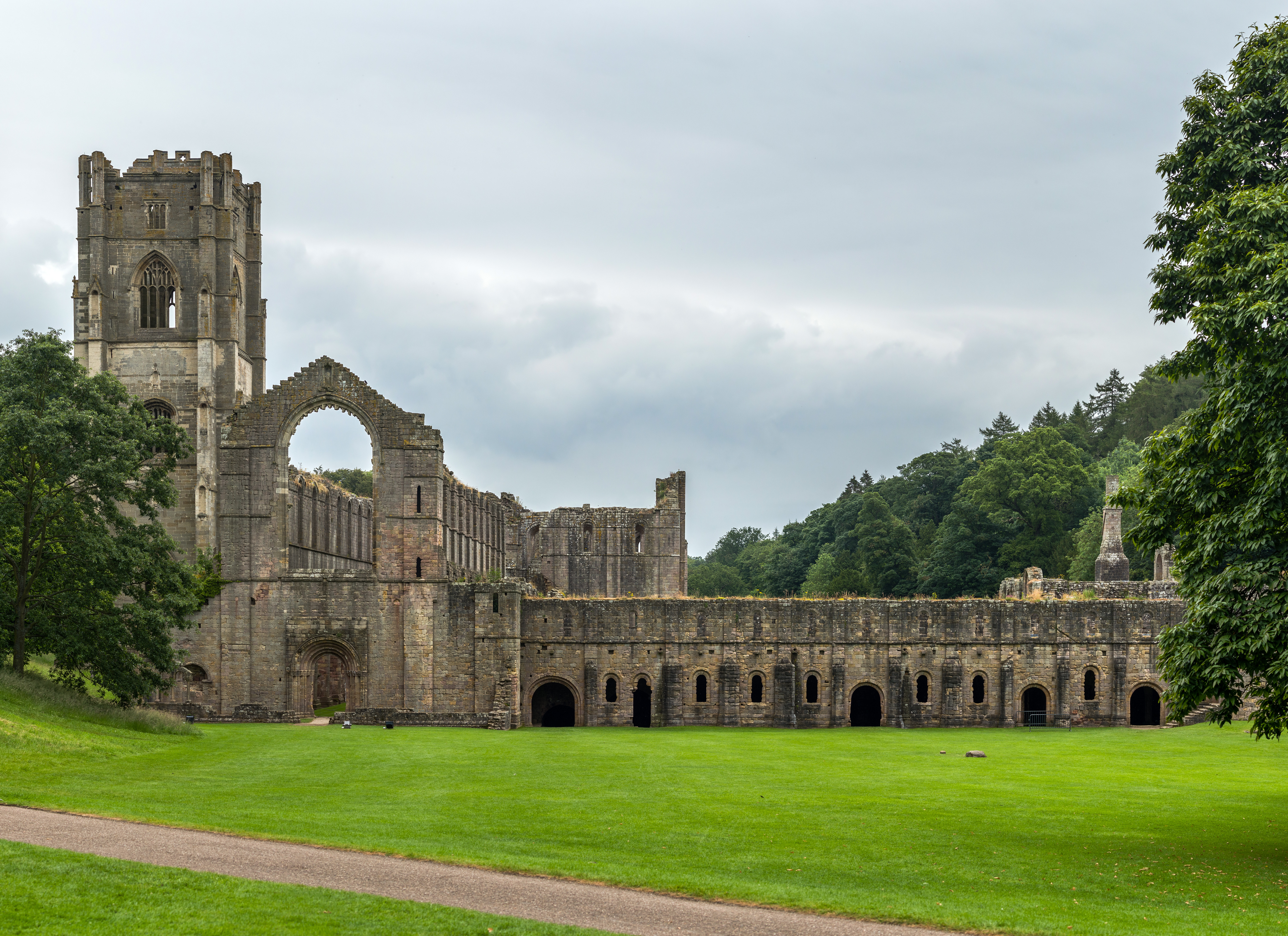
The ruins of Fountains Abbey

Murdac was then installed as the new archbishop, being consecrated on 7 December 1147 by Eugene III. He was the first Cistercian bishop in England, as well as being the first bishop or archbishop elected since the Norman Conquest without the approval of the king. However, York's cathedral chapter refused to acknowledge his appointment, so he retired to Ripon. King Stephen also refused to recognise him, sequestering the stalls of York and imposing a fine on the town of Beverley for harbouring him. In retaliation, Murdac excommunicated Hugh de Puiset, Treasurer of York, and his other enemies and laid the city under interdict. Puiset, in return, excommunicated the Archbishop and ordered the services to be conducted as usual. In this he was supported by Eustace, son of Stephen.

Murdac, in retaliation for Stephen's refusal to recognise his election, supported King David I of Scotland in 1149, when David invaded the north of England. David was ostensibly invading to put his nephew Henry Plantagenet on the English throne, but modern historians feel that David was also pursuing his own aims of strengthening his kingdom. Murdac probably took the step of aligning himself with the Scots because of Murdac's desire to establish York's independence from the primacy of the see of Canterbury. Murdac hoped that David would be able to install Murdac in York, where the archbishop had been refused entry.

In 1150, Stephen finally recognised Henry Murdac as Archbishop of York, probably hoping that Henry would then intercede with Eugenius to secure the coronation of Eustace, but that did not happen. Murdac also continued to lack support in the city of York itself, and continued to reside at Ripon. Finally, in January 1151, Henry was able to enter York. Later in 1151, the archbishop travelled to Rome to consult with the pope about Eustace's coronation, but was unable to secure permission from the pope. In 1153, Puiset was elected Bishop of Durham, which greatly offended Murdac chiefly because he, as metropolitan of the province, had not been consulted. He excommunicated the prior and Archdeacon of Durham, who came to York to implore mercy and absolution. The King and his son Eustace implored him to grant the rebels absolution, but he refused, until they came to Beverley, acknowledged their fault, and submitted to scourging at the entrance to the Minster when he did finally absolve them.

Murdac spent five of his six years as Archbishop at Ripon. Despite everything, he retained his influence over Fountains and the three succeeding abbots, Maurice (1148), Thorald (1148–1150), and Richard (1150–1170), were suffragan abbots under him.

== Death and afterwards ==
Henry died at Beverley on 14 October 1153. Following Henry's death, William FitzHerbert was reinstalled as archbishop and made his peace with the community at Fountains. Murdac was buried at York Minster. His nephew Hugh Murdac was a canon at York Minster and was elected as Archdeacon of Cleveland in 1201 but not confirmed in that office.

== Citations ==
Catholic Church titles
Preceded by William of York	Archbishop of York; 1147–1153	Succeeded by William of York
