= Henry of Blois =

English bishop (c. 1096–1171)

Henry of Winchester
- Bishop of Winchester
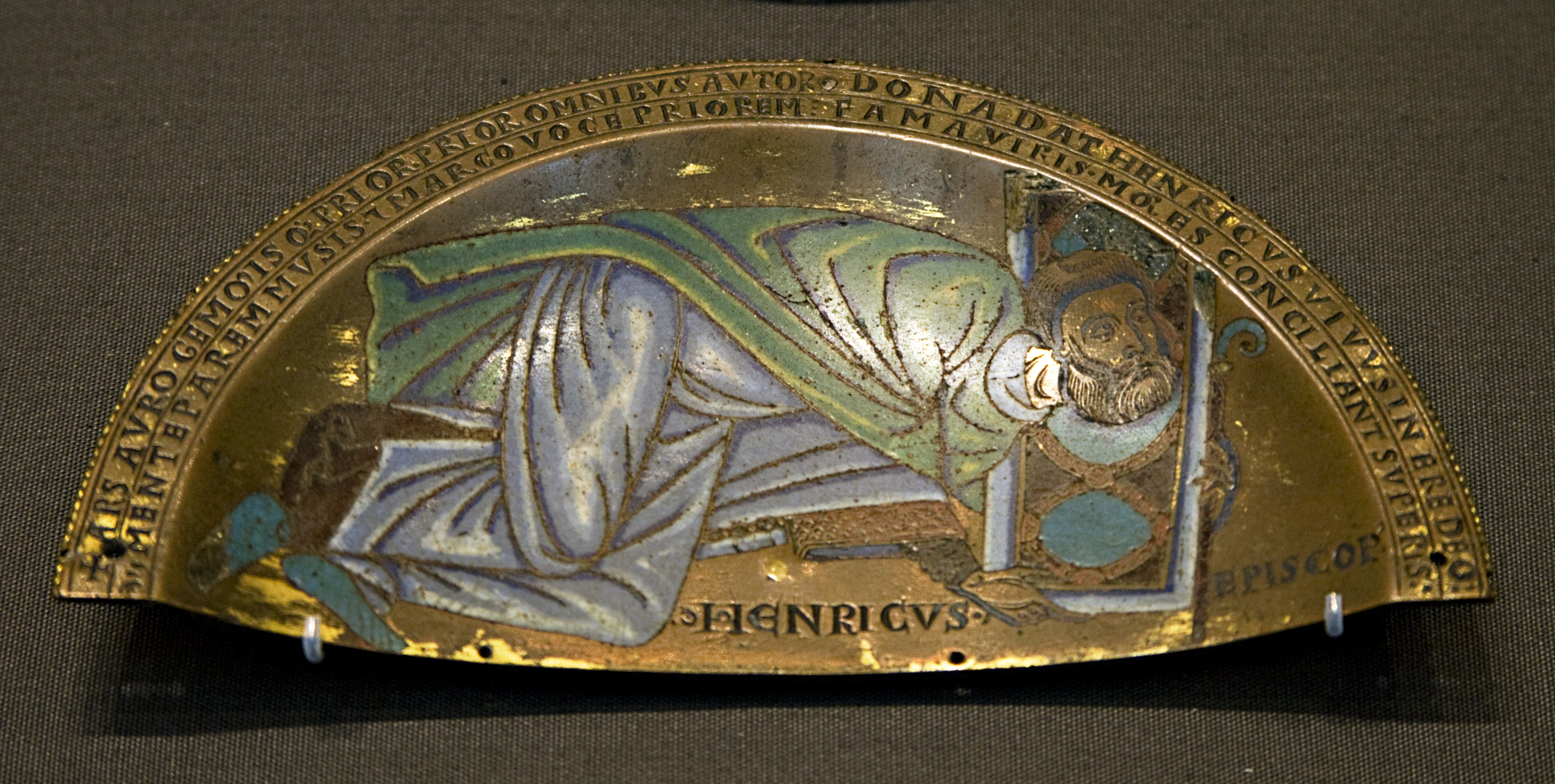
- Contemporary plaque showing Henry of Blois, now in the British Museum, c. 1150
- Appointed: 4 October 1129
- Term ended: 8 August 1171
- Predecessor: William Giffard
- Successor: Richard of Ilchester
- Previous post: Abbot of Glastonbury

Orders
- Consecration: 17 November 1129

Personal details
- Born: c. 1096 Blois, Loir-et-Cher, Centre, France
- Died: 8 August 1171 (aged around 75) City of Winchester, England
- Buried: 8 August 1171; Winchester Cathedral
- Denomination: Catholicism
- Parents: Stephen Henry, Count of Blois; Adela of Normandy

Henry of Blois (c. 1096 – 8 August 1171), often known as Henry of Winchester, was the abbot of Glastonbury Abbey from 1126 and bishop of Winchester from 1129 to his death.

Henry was the son of Count Stephen-Henry of Blois and Adela of Normandy, a younger brother of Stephen, King of England, and a grandson of William the Conqueror. Henry was also a major patron of the arts, funding the Winchester Bible and the font in Winchester Cathedral. He founded the Hospital of St Cross and built much of Wolvesey Castle.

== Early life and education ==
Henry was one of five sons of Count Stephen-Henry of Blois and Adela, daughter of King William the Conqueror of England. His birth date is uncertain, along with his siblings but he was the fourth or youngest son and he was most likely born at Blois around 1096, before his father left on the First Crusade, or possibly around 1100, soon after his father's return. Henry's father died in 1102 during the Battle of Ramla, leaving an estate with more than 350 castles and large properties in France including Chartres.

Henry was educated at Cluny and adhered to the principles of Cluniac reform, which included a sense of intellectual freedom and humanism, as well as a high standard of devotion and discipline.

== Abbot and bishop ==
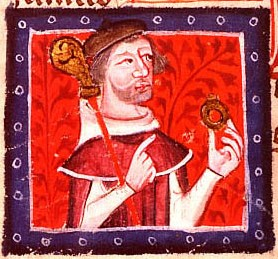
Henry of Blois depicted with a crosier and a ring

Henry was brought to England by his uncle King Henry I, to be abbot of Glastonbury. On 4 October 1129, he was given the bishopric of Winchester and allowed to keep his beloved Glastonbury Abbey. He was consecrated bishop on 17 November 1129. He had ambitions to become Archbishop of Canterbury but refused to abandon his work and obligations to Glastonbury. Soon after his appointment to the see of Winchester, Henry came to resent his subservience to Canterbury. He therefore set about building a powerbase to persuade the king to create a third, West Country archdiocese with himself at the head. This scheme was unsuccessful. After the death of King Henry I in 1135, Henry's brother Stephen seized the English throne. On 1 March 1139, Henry obtained a commission as papal legate, which gave him higher rank than Theobald of Bec, archbishop of Canterbury, making him the most powerful figure in the English Church during the troubled times of The Anarchy. Thus, when his brother was unavailable, Henry of Blois was the most powerful and wealthiest man in England.

Stephen and Henry's relations were not always peaceful. After the Battle of Lincoln in 1141, Henry found it more advantageous to support the claim of their cousin Empress Matilda to the English throne; but later found her arrogant and greedy. Later that year, Henry rejoined his brother's side and, with the help of his sister-in-law Queen Matilda and an army commanded by William of Ypres, his successful defence of Winchester against the Empress was the turning point of the civil war. As Abbot of Glastonbury, Henry remained in contact with Peter the Venerable at Cluny and was made aware of most of the controversies on the continent, specifically the persecution of Peter Abelard (whom Peter the Venerable defended) and the translation of the Koran from Arabic to Latin (which Peter the Venerable commissioned).

== Architecture ==
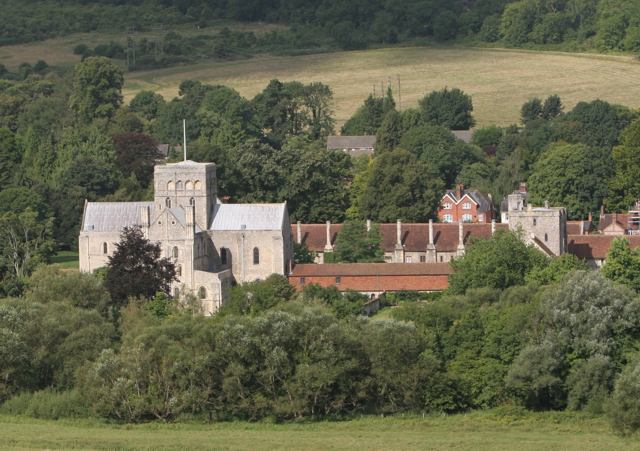
Hospital of St Cross founded in the 1130s by Bishop Henry

Before and after his elevation to bishop, Henry of Blois was an advisor to his brother Stephen and survived him. Henry of Blois engineered hundreds of projects, including villages and canals, abbeys and smaller churches. He was most proud of his contributions to the greatest developments at Glastonbury Abbey, long before the destructive fire of 1184. Like most great bishops of his age, Henry had a passion for architecture. He built the final additions to Winchester Cathedral and Wolvesey Castle in Winchester, including a tourist tunnel under the cathedral to make it easier for pilgrims to view relics. He also designed and built additions to many palaces and large houses including the castle of Farnham, Surrey and began the construction of the Hospital of St Cross at Winchester. In London he built Winchester Palace as a residence for the bishops of Winchester. In Rome, John of Salisbury reported, he acquired an impressive number of ancient Roman sculptures, defending his purchases as preventing the Romans of his day from worshipping these "idols".

According to the Winchester Chronicle in 1138, “Bishop Henry built a palatial house and a strong tower in Winchester and castles at Merdon, Farnham, Waltham, Downton, and Taunton,” though historian John Hare indicates the date “should be regarded with caution.” Much of Henry's work was undone in 1155, when the new king, Henry II, ordered that his castles be thrown down.

== Literature ==
Henry was also enamoured of books and their distribution. He wrote or sponsored several books including On the Antiquity of the Glastonbury Church by William of Malmesbury, a close personal friend. He sponsored the Winchester Bible, the largest illustrated Bible ever produced. It is a huge folio edition standing nearly three feet in height. This Bible is still on display at Winchester, although it was never fully finished. His production of the Winchester Psalter, also known as the Blois Psalter, is preserved in the British Library and is considered a British National Treasure.

== Later years and death ==
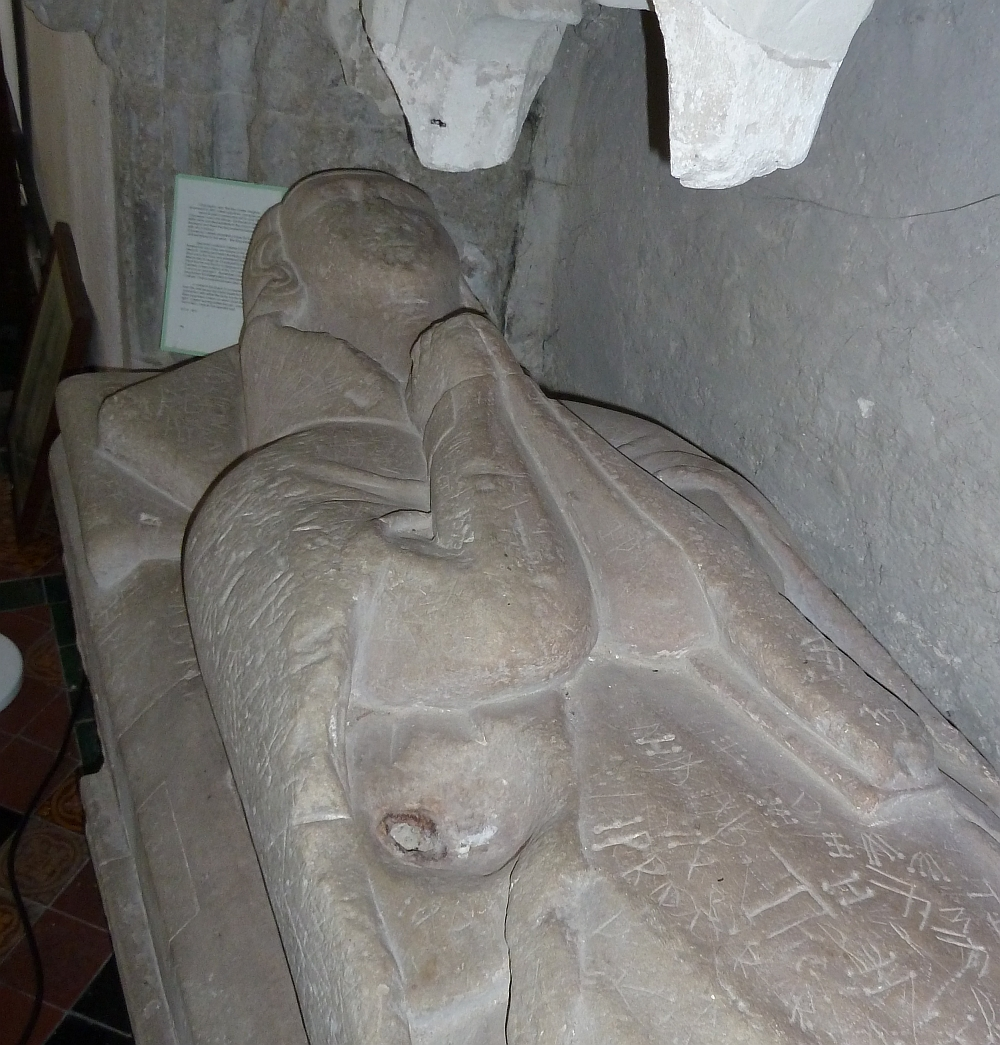
A 13th-century effigy of a priest at St Mary the Virgin, Ivinghoe, possibly representing Henry of Blois.

The expiration of Henry's legatine commission when Pope Innocent II died on 23 September 1143 deprived him of much of his power. His efforts to renew the commission were unsuccessful, but he made a personal visit to Rome and secured several favours for Glastonbury and the Benedictine order in general. Shortly after his brother's death and the accession of Henry II, the bishop retired to Cluny, where he had sent much treasure, for at least two years and mourned there his mentor Peter the Venerable, who died on Christmas Day, 1156.

In his later years, he was among the bishops forced to agree to the Constitutions of Clarendon in January 1164, which paved the way for the Becket Controversy. He was also appointed to preside over the trial of Thomas Becket and secretly supported Becket's family before and after his assassination.

Henry died on 8 August 1171. Among his gifts to Cluny, was a pyx set with gems in the choir. Henry of Blois is now buried in Winchester Cathedral in a plain stone crypt in the choir, but there is a controversy because some sources claim he was buried at Cluny. Recent research indicates he was also entombed for a time in a small church (St Mary the Virgin) at Ivinghoe, Buckinghamshire. One explanation describes his heart enshrined at Cluny while his corpse and other artifacts were moved from Ivinghoe to Winchester in the 17th century. For many years his sarcophagus was thought to be that of his uncle King William II. In the Antiquities, William of Malmesbury who knew the bishop well, described him, saying, "Yet, in spite of his noble birth he blushes when praised."

== Citations ==
Catholic Church titles
Preceded by William Giffard	Bishop of Winchester; 1129–1171	Succeeded by Richard of Ilchester
