= Gervais of Rethel =

11th century French nobleman

Gervais, Count of Rethel
- Born: Corbeil
- Died: 1124
- Noble family: de Rethel
- Spouse: Elisabeth of Namur
- Issue: Millicent or Elizabeth?
- Father: Hugh I, Count of Rethel
- Mother: Melisende of Crécy

Gervais, Count of Rethel (fl. 11th century) was a French archbishop and nobleman. He was the son of Count Hugh I and his wife Melisende of Crécy. He succeeded his father as Count of Rethel.

== Biography ==
Gervais served as an archdeacon of Rheims before being nominated as Archbishop of Rheims by the King's supporters against Raoul le Vert (Ralph the Green) in 1106. The next year Paschall II declared him unfit, quashed his election and Gervais resigned as archbishop in 1109, returning to his former role as archdeacon.

Upon the death of his elder brother, Manasser, in 1115, Gervais resigned from the clergy and married Elisabeth, daughter of Godfrey I, Count of Namur and in 1118 he succeeded his father as Count of Rethel.

Gervais died in 1124 and his widow Elizabeth remarried to Roger Clarembauld, Lord of Rosoi in Thierache who gave the hand of his step-daughter to Robert Marmion, Baron of Tamworth.

Because Gervais' younger brother Baldwin was in the Holy Land, where he served as King of Jerusalem, he was succeeded as ruler of Rethel by his sister Matilda and her husband Odo of Vitry.

== Family and Issue ==
He was married to Elisabeth, a daughter of Godfrey I, Count of Namur. According to the Chronicle of Alberic of Trois-Fontaines they had a single daughter:-

- Melisende de Rethel (Millicent) married to Robert Marmion (d.1181) and forebear of all three English Marmion Baronys. Married secondly to Richard de Camville, with at least one son, Richard.

Gervais of Rethel Born: 1056 Died: 1124
Preceded by Manasses II	Archbishop of Reims; 1106–1106	Succeeded by Raoul le Vert
Preceded by Hugh I	Count of Rethel; 1118-1124	Succeeded by Matilda
