= Hugh II of Rethel =

Hugh II, Count of Rethel
- Died: 1227
- Spouse: Felicitas of Broyes
- Issue: Helissende; Hugh III; Matilda; John; Walter; Manasses V
- Father: Manasses IV, Count of Rethel
- Mother: Matilda of Kyrburg

Hugh II, Count of Rethel (died 1227) was a son of Manasses IV and his wife, Matilda of Kyrburg. In 1199, he succeeded his father as Count of Rethel.

In 1191, he married Felicitas (d. 1257), the daughter of Simon of Broyes. They had the following children:

- Helissende (d. 1234), married Thomas, the son of Geoffroy III, Count of Perche
- Hugh III (d. 1243)
- Matilda, married Thomas II of Coucy-Vervins (1184–1253), the son of Ralph I, Lord of Coucy
- John (d. 1251), married Marie of Thourotte
- Walter (d. 1262)
- Manasses V (d. 1273)

Hugh II of Rethel Died: 1227
Preceded by Manasses IV	Count of Rethel; 1199–1227	Succeeded by Hugh III
