= Manasses IV of Rethel =

Manasses IV, Count of Rethel
- Died: 1199
- Spouse: Matilda of Upper Lorraine
- Issue: Hugh II
- Father: Ithier I, Count of Rethel
- Mother: Beatrice of Namur

Manasses IV, Count of Rethel (died 1199) was a son of Guitier of Rethel and Beatrice of Namur. He succeeded his father as Count of Rethel in 1171. He is probably the Count of Rethel who was responsible for despoiling churches in the early reign of Philip II of France.

Manasses IV was married to Matilda of Upper Lorraine and was the father of Hugh II.

Manasses IV of Rethel Died: 1199
Preceded by Ithier I	Count of Rethel; 1171–1199	Succeeded by Hugh II
