= Guitier, Count of Rethel =

Guitier (Ithier) of Rethel (died 1171), son of Odo, Castellan of Vitry and Matilda, Countess of Rethel, nephew of Baldwin II of Jerusalem, was count of Rethel, succeeding his mother. In March 1129, Guitier travelled to the Holy Land, although it is not clear if he participated in the Damascus Crusade that year.

Guitier married Beatrice, daughter of Count Godfrey I of Namur and Erminside of Luxembourg. Guitier and Beatrix had eleven children:

- Beatrice (1130 – 30 March 1185), married King Roger II of Sicily
- John (died after 1144)
- Manasses (died after 1144)
- Hugh(died after 1166), a monk at Reims
- Manasses IV (died 1199)
- Henry (died 1191), castellan of Vitry
- Baldwin (died 1198 or after), lord Chemery
- Albert (died 1195 or after), archdeacon at Liège
- Simon
- Clemence (died after 1190), married Hugh of Pierrepont
- Daughter (name unknown), married Geoffroy, Vidame de Châlons.

Upon his death, he was succeeded as count of Rethel by his son Manasses IV.

== Sources ==
- Houben, Hubert (2002). Roger II of Sicily: Ruler between East and West. Translated by Loud, Graham A.; Milburn, Diane. Cambridge University Press.
- Housley, Norman, ed. (2007). Knighthoods of Christ: Essays on the History of the Crusades and the Knights. Ashgate Publishing Limited.
- Murray, Alan V. (2000). The Crusader Kingdom of Jerusalem: A Dynastic History 1099-1125. Prosographica et Genealogica.
