= Matilda of Rethel =

Matilda, Countess of Rethel
- Born: 1091; Rethel
- Died: 1151 (Aged around 60)
- Noble family: de Rethel
- Spouse: Odo, Castellan of Vitry
- Issue: Ithier
- Father: Hugh I, Count of Rethel
- Mother: Melisende of Crécy

Matilda (1091 in Rethel – 1151) was the countess of Rethel from 1124 until 1151.

She was a daughter of Count Hugh I and Melisende of Crécy. In 1124, she succeeded her brother Gervais as countess. She ruled jointly with her husband, Odo.

Matilda and Odo had a son, Ithier (1115-1171), who succeeded Odo as count.

== Sources ==
- Housley, Norman, ed. (2007). Knighthoods of Christ: Essays on the History of the Crusades and the Knights. Ashgate Publishing Limited.

Matilda of Rethel Born: 1091 Died: 1151
Preceded by Gervais	Countess of Rethel; 1124-1151	Succeeded by Odo
