= Odo of Vitry =

12th-century French nobleman and castellan

- Died: 1158
- Spouse: Matilda, Countess of Rethel
- Issue: Ithier

Odo of Vitry (Eudes) (died 1158) was a French nobleman. Count of Rethel and Châtelain de Vitry. His parentage is unclear. It is sometimes stated that he was a son of André, castellan of Vitré and of Agnès de Mortain, but this appears to be based on a confusion between Vitré in Brittany and Vitry in Champagne. On the death of his brother-in-law, Gervase, he received the county of Rethel.

Odo was married to Matilda (d. 1151), the eldest daughter of Hugh I, Count of Rethel. They had at least four children:

- Guitier of Rethel
- Unnamed daughter who married Etienne Strabo de Neufchâtel-sur Aisne
- Unnamed daughter who married a lord of Henalmont
- Yvette, who married first a Milo and second Villian d'Arzillières.

From 1124 until his wife's death in 1151, he ruled Rethel jointly with her. After her death, he ruled alone. Odo died in 1158, and was succeeded by his son Guitier.

== Sources ==
- Housley, Norman, ed. (2007). Knighthoods of Christ: Essays on the History of the Crusades and the Knights. Ashgate Publishing Limited.

Odo of Vitry Died: 1158
Preceded by Gervais	Count of Rethel; 1124-1158; With: Matilda (until 1151)	Succeeded by Ithier
