= Albert of Rethel =

12th-century priest from Prince-Bishopric of Liège

Albert of Rethel (c. 1150 – 1195, in Rome) was provost of St. Lambert's Cathedral in Liège.

== Biography ==
He was son of Guitier, Count of Rethel and Beatrix of Namur and a cousin of Baldwin V, Count of Hainaut. He first served as a priest in St. Lambert and became its provost in 1180. He was also provost of St. Martin and St. Denis.

His maternal cousin Rudolf of Zähringen, the prince-bishop of Liège, entrusted Albert the administration of the diocese under the title of vice-Bishop before going on Crusade. In 1191, while on the way of returning, Rudolf died. At the election on his successor on September 8 five or six canons voted Albert under the support of Count Baldwin V, but the other candidate Albert of Louvain Archdeacon of Brabant gained more support.

Henry VI, Holy Roman Emperor favoured Albert because he was a maternal-uncle of Empress Constance, while both Henry and Constance had planned to support Albert to be the bishop of Liège given the post was vacant. However, Constance was then imprisoned by Sicilians after being captured earlier the same year and could do nothing to support her uncle. At the Diet of Worms on January 13, 1192 the Emperor appointed his newly made imperial chancellor Lothar of Hochstaden, provost of the church of St Cassius in Bonn and brother of Count Dietrich of Hochstaden instead given that the election was under dispute. Baldwin V accepted it and Albert relinquished while Albert of Louvain indignantly refused a financial settlement offered by the emperor, and the majority of the electors of Liège accepted the imperial decision because of the emperor's threat; but Henry I of Brabant brother of Albert of Louvain refused, and they obtained support from Pope Celestine III by May, around when Empress Constance was released and would later return to Holy Roman Empire.

Henry VI supported Lothar and Baldwin to take action against Albert of Louvain, and in November, Albert of Louvain was killed by three German knights at Reims. Lothar was blamed for this and excommunicated, forcing him to abandon the diocese of Liège. Simon of Limbourg was elected to be the successor and recognised by Henry VI.

In 1194 Albert and Albert of Cuyck travelled to Rome to protest the result of the election as Simon was as young as 16 years old, and on November Celestine III appointed Albert of Cuyck instead; Albert died and was buried in Rome the next year.

Giles of Orval described Albert as rude, greedy, ambitious, illiterate, and unfair. There is no other source for this. Vita Alberti episcopi Leodiensis described Albert as "stupid and illiterate".
