= Joan of Flanders =

Joan of Flanders may refer to:

- Joan, Countess of Flanders (c. 1199–1244)
- Joan of Flanders, Countess of Montfort (c. 1295–1374)
