= Cecilia of Le Bourcq =

Cilician noblewoman

Cecilia of Le Bourcq (died after 1126) was a Cilician fiefholder as lady of Tarsus. She was the daughter of Count Hugh I of Rethel and Melisende, daughter of Guy I of Montlhéry. Cecilia's brother was Baldwin II of Jerusalem.

== Life ==
According to Fulcher of Chartres, Baldwin arranged for Cecilia to be married to Roger of Salerno. Roger and Cecilia married in 1113, soon after he became prince-regent of Antioch. Together with the marriage of Baldwin's daughter Alice of Antioch to Bohemond II, Prince of Antioch, the women of the Rethel dynasty were among the most powerful in the Holy Land.

She was granted lands in Cilicia some time before 1126, which may have facilitated the marriage of Cecilia's sister Béatrice to Leo I, Prince of Armenia. According to Rüdt-Collenberg, Cæcilia dominia Tarsi et soror regis Balduini II donated property to the church of St Marie, Josaphat by charter dated 1126, with the agreement of Bohemond II.

Cecilia held a lordship in Cilicia at the start of the reign of Bohemond II and was known as the lady of Tarsus (probably self-anointed in a charter). She was a major Antiochene landholder and is believed to have helped organize Antioch's defenses in 1119, when, during the Battle of Ager Sanguinis, her husband Roger was killed. Cecilia was not considered as a possible regent nor did she play a role in picking Roger's successor.

Cecilia and Roger had no children. It is not known what her activities were after her husband's death.

== See also ==
- Houses of Montlhéry and Le Puiset
- Women in the Crusades

== Sources ==
- Riley-Smith, Jonathan, The First Crusaders, 1095-1131, Cambridge University Press, London, 1997
- Asbridge, Thomas S., The Creation of the Principality of Antioch, 1098-1130, Boydell & Brewer Ltd., Suffolk, 2000 (available on Google Books)
- Hagenmeyer, Heinrich (editor), Fulcheri Carnotensis Historia Hierosolymitana (1095-1127), Heidelberg, 1913 (available online)
- Rüdt-Collenberg, Hugo, The Rupenides, Hethumides and Lusignans: the structure of the Armeno-Cilician dynasties, Klincksieck, Paris, 1963
- Edbury, Peter and Phillips, Jonathan, The Experience of Crusading, Volume 1, Cambridge University Press, London, 2003 (available on Google Books)
- Röhricht, Gustav Reinhold, Regesta Regni Hierosolymitani, 1097–1291 (Innsbruck, 1893), with Additamentum (1904) (available online)
