= Louis I of Flanders =

Count of Flanders from 1322 to 1346

Louis I
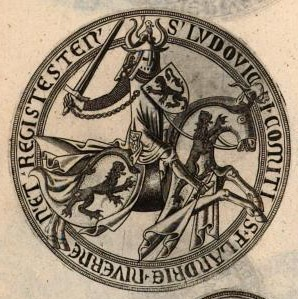
- Louis I's effigy on his seal
- Born: c. 1304
- Died: 26 August 1346; Battle of Crécy
- Noble family: Dampierre
- Spouse: Margaret I, Countess of Artois
- Issue: Louis II of Flanders; Guy de Rickenbourg
- Father: Louis I, Count of Nevers
- Mother: Joan, Countess of Rethel

Louis I (c. 1304 – 26 August 1346, ruled 1322–1346) was Count of Flanders, Nevers and Rethel.

== Life ==
He was the son of Count Louis I of Nevers and Countess Joan of Rethel, and grandson of Robert III of Flanders. He succeeded his father as count of Nevers and his grandfather as count of Flanders in 1322.

In July 1320 Louis married Margaret, second daughter of King Philip V of France and Countess Joan II of Burgundy, who would later inherit her mother's counties of Burgundy and Artois in 1361. This marriage alliance made him break with the anti-French policy of his grandfather Robert III and great-grandfather Guy.

== Count of Flanders ==
Louis's pro-French policies and excessive taxations caused an uprising in 1323. Beginning as a series of scattered rural riots, the peasant insurrection escalated into a full-scale rebellion that dominated public affairs in Flanders for nearly five years until 1328. The rebels, led by Nicolaas Zannekin, captured the towns of Nieuwpoort, Veurne, Ypres and Kortrijk. In Kortrijk, Zannekin was able to capture Louis himself. On 30 November 1325 in the church of St. Basil, Louis swore amnesty to the rebels, investigation of John of Namur's actions as regent, and approval of all actions take by regent Robert of Cassel. The following day, Louis was released and fled to Paris.

On 26 April 1326, the King Charles IV of France, intervened and the Peace of Arques was sealed. This treaty presented the King of France as the aggrieved party, leaving Louis as a bystander. The treaty, not supported by rebel districts in Flanders, did not last long, and soon hostilities erupted again. Philip VI of France was forced to come to Louis's aid while Zannekin and his adherents were decisively defeated by the French royal army in the Battle of Cassel. Control of Flanders was returned to Louis, with a warning from Philip that if Louis needed to be rescued again, Flanders would be incorporated into the kingdom of France.

When the Hundred Years War started, Louis remained steadfast in his French policy, even with the county being economically dependent on England. His actions resulted in a boycott of the wool trade imposed by King Edward III of England, which in turn sparked a new insurrection in 1337 under Jacob van Artevelde. In 1339 the count had to flee his lands, never being able to return. Louis was killed at the Battle of Crécy in 1346.

== Family ==
Louis and Margaret had:

- Louis II of Flanders (1330–1384), who succeeded him.

He also had a natural son Guy de Rickenbourg.

== Sources ==
- Bubenicek, Michelle (2002). Quand les femmes gouvernent: droit et politique au XIVe siècle:Yolande de Flandre, Droit et politique au XIV siecle (in French). Ecole des Chartes.
- Nicholas, David M (1992). Medieval Flanders. Taylor & Francis.
- Nicolle, David (2000). Crécy 1346: Triumph of the Longbow. Osprey.
- Sumption, Jonathan (1990). Trial by Battle: The Hundred Years War. Vol. I. Faber and Faber.
- TeBrake, William H. (1993). A Plague of Insurrection: Popular Politics and Peasant Revolt in Flanders, 1323-1328. University of Pennsylvania Press.

Louis I of Flanders House of Dampierre Born: c. 1304 Died: 26 August 1346
| Preceded by Robert III | Count of Flanders; 1322–1346 | Succeeded by Louis II & III |
| Preceded by Louis I | Count of Nevers; 1322–1346 | Succeeded by Louis II & III |
| Preceded by Joan | Count of Rethel; 1328–1346 | Succeeded by Louis II & III |
