= Joan of Rethel =

Countess of Rethel (1285–1328)

Joan

Countess of Rethel
- Died: c. 1328
- Noble family: House of Dampierre
- Spouse: Louis I, Count of Nevers (m. 1290; died 1322)
- Issue: Joanna, Duchess of Brittany; Louis I, Count of Flanders
- Father: Hugh IV, Count of Rethel
- Mother: Isabella of Grandpré

Joan (French: Jeanne; died 1328) was the ruling countess of Rethel from 1285 until her death in 1328 and countess of Nevers as the wife of Louis I of Nevers (r. 1280–1322).

== Life ==
Coat of Arms of the rulers of Rethel

Joan was the only daughter of Count Hugh IV of Rethel (r. 1272–1285) and his third wife, Isabella of Grandpré (1245–1292). She succeeded her father as countess of Rethel in 1285.

In December 1290, she married Count Louis I of Nevers (who, in 1314 failed in his bid to become Holy Roman Emperor), son of Count Robert III of Flanders. The marriage was described as "notoriously fractious".

They had two children:

- Joan (1295–1375), married John of Montfort
- Louis (1304–1346), Count of Flanders, Nevers and Rethel

Joan of Rethel House of Dampierre Died: 1328
French nobility
Preceded by Hugh IV	Countess of Rethel; 1285–1328 with Louis I	Succeeded by Louis II
