= Hugh I of Rethel =

11th/12th-century French nobleman

Hugh I, Count of Rethel
- Born: 1040; Bourg
- Died: 1118 (aged 77–78); Rethel
- Noble family: de Rethel
- Spouse: Melisende of Crécy
- Issue: Manasses; Gervais; Baldwin II; Matilda; Hodierna; Cecilia; Béatrice
- Father: Manasses III, Count of Rethel
- Mother: Judith of Lorena

Hugh I (1040–1118) was the count of Rethel from 1065 to 1118. He was the son of Count Manasses III and his wife Judith.

Hugh married Melisende of Crécy, the daughter of Lord Guy I of Montlhéry. They had the following children:

- Manasses (1054–1115)
- Gervais (1056–1124), who became count of Rethel
- Baldwin (1058–1131), who became king of Jerusalem
- Matilda (b. 1060), who became countess of Rethel
- Hodierna, married Héribrand III of Hierges
- Cecilia, who married Roger of Salerno, prince-regent of Antioch
- Béatrice, who married Leo I, lord of Armenian Cilicia

== See also ==
- Houses of Montlhéry and Le Puiset

== Sources ==
- Housley, Norman, ed. (2007). Knighthoods of Christ: Essays on the History of the Crusades and the Knights. Ashgate Publishing Limited.
- La Monte, John L. (1942). "The Lords of Le Puiset on the Crusades". Speculum. 17 (1 January).
- Runciman, Steven (1999). A History of the Crusades. Vol. II. Cambridge University Press.

Hugh I of Rethel Born: 1040 Died: 1118
Preceded by Manasses III	Count of Rethel; 1065–1118	Succeeded by Gervais
