= Joan of Brittany, Lady Basset of Drayton =

Anglo-French noble

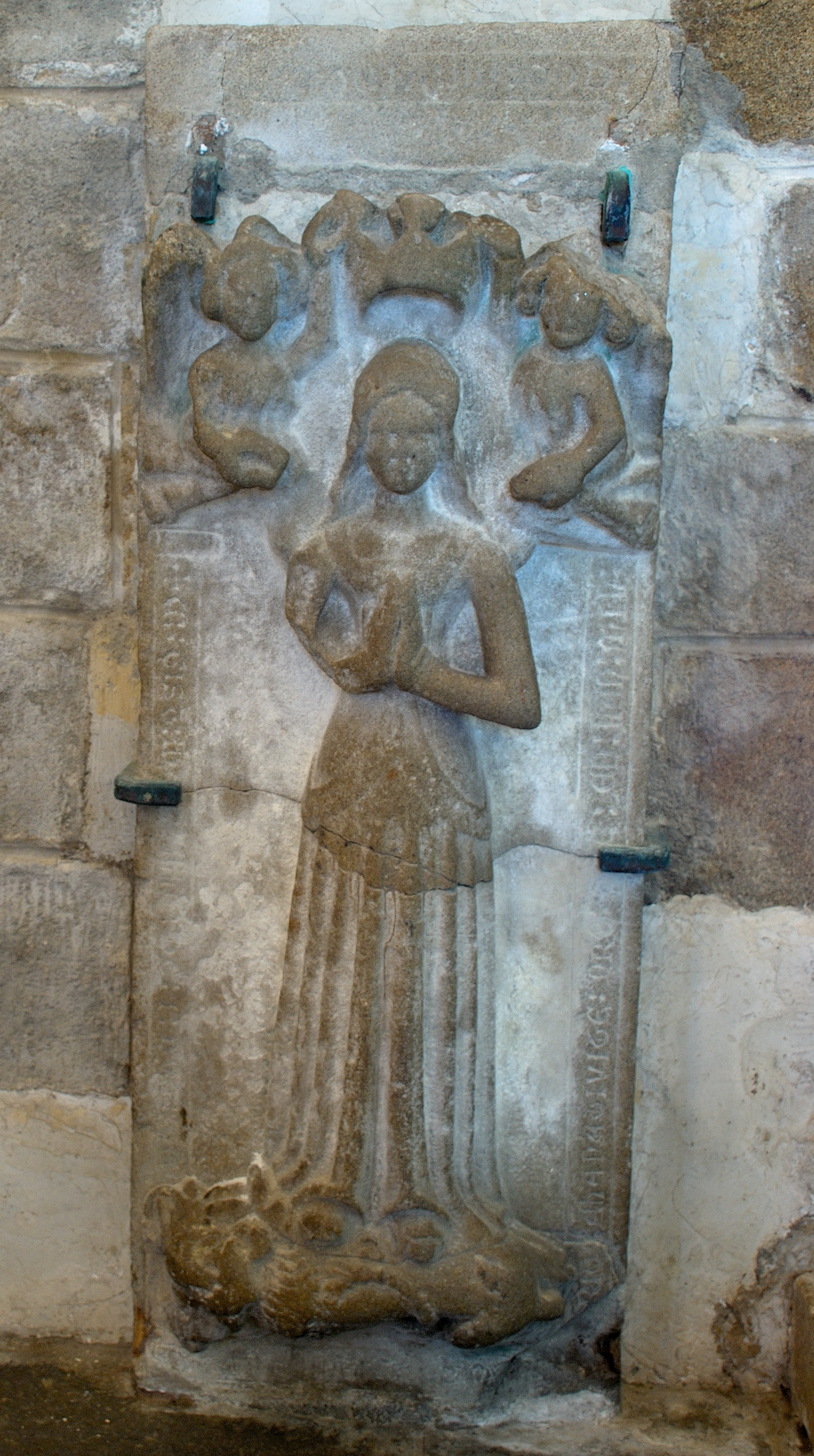
Tombstone of Joan of Brittany

Joan of Brittany, Lady Basset of Drayton (1341 – November 8, 1402), also known as Joan of Montfort and in French Jeanne de Bretagne, was the daughter of John of Montfort, Duke of Brittany, and the sister of John IV.

== Biography ==
Her parents were John, Count of Montfort, and Joan of Flanders.

She grew up in England together with her brother, John IV, Duke of Brittany, and was brought up with King Edward III's children. When her brother returned to Brittany to take the dukedom, she remained in England. At the age of 39 she married Ralph Basset, 3rd Baron Basset of Drayton.

In 1398 she was appointed as a Constable of Richmond Castle by the will of King Richard II.

Joan died on November 8, 1402, and was buried at Lavendon Abbey, in Buckinghamshire.

== Titles ==
- Baroness Basset of Drayton (from her marriage in 1380)
- Constable of Richmond Castle (from 1398)

== Sources ==
- Michael Jones, Ducal Brittany, 1364–1399: relations with England and France during the reign of Duke John IV (Oxford University Press, 1970)
