= Joan of Flanders, Countess of Montfort =

Duchess of Brittany from 1341 to 1345

Joan
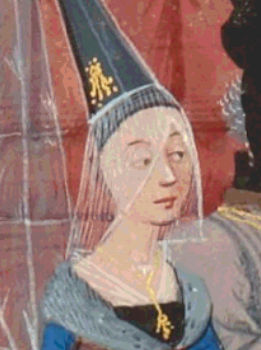

Duchess consort of Brittany
- Tenure: 30 April 1341–16 September 1345
- Born: c. 1295
- Died: September 1374 (aged 78–79)
- Spouse: John of Montfort
- Issue: John IV, Duke of Brittany; Joan, Baroness of Drayton
- House: Dampierre
- Father: Louis I, Count of Nevers
- Mother: Joan, Countess of Rethel

Joan of Flanders (Note: The subject is known by various names depending on the source and the language of the source. Some sources call her Jeanne de Flandre, Countess of Montfort, others Joan of Flanders, Joanna of Flanders, or Jeanne la Flamme.) (c. 1295 – September 1374) was duchess of Brittany by her marriage to John of Montfort. Much of her life was taken up in defense of the rights of her husband to the duchy, and, later, her son's rights to the duchy, which was challenged by the House of Blois during the War of the Breton Succession. Known for her fiery personality, Joan led Montfort's cause after her husband had been captured by Philip VI of France, and began the fight back. There, she displayed considerable skill as a military leader and gained the respect of her people. Shortly after taking refuge in England, she was confined to Tickhill Castle by order of King Edward III for reasons which are disputed.

Joan was highly praised by the chronicler Jean Froissart for her courage and energy. She may have been an inspiration to Joan of Arc and was a role model to Victorian feminists. Because of her feats of leadership, historian David Hume described her as "the most extraordinary woman of the age".

== Life ==
=== Family ===
Joan was the daughter of Count Louis I of Nevers and Countess Joan of Rethel.

Joan's mother was the only daughter of Count Hugh IV of Rethel (r. 1272–1285) and his third wife, Isabelle of Grandpré (1245–1292). She succeeded her father as Countess of Rethel in 1285. Through both her parents, Joan was related to the French Capetian dynasty and was a descendant of Eleanor of Aquitaine and Louis XII.

There were many instances of women of Joan's family taking part in ruling their own lands and involving themselves in politics.

The marriage of Joan's parents was described as "notoriously fractious", in part due to their differing personalities but more likely because of Louis many extramarital affairs.

Joan's father pursued an anti-French agenda which saw Joan and her brother taken hostage by Philip IV, while their father was arrested and imprisoned in a private residence in Paris. He did eventually manage to escape captivity and fled to Flanders, where he died in 1322.

Joan was raised at the French court.

== Marriage ==
Joan married John of Monfort in March 1329 in the Notre Dame cathedral, in the presence of Philip IV.

John of Monfort claimed the Duchy of Brittany, although his claim was contested by his niece Joan of Penthièvre and her husband, Charles of Blois. Joan of Flanders and John had two children:

- John IV, Duke of Brittany (1339–1399) with his life marred by the War of Breton Succession, John was taken into the household of Edward III before he returned to reinforce his claim as the duke of Brittany.
- Joan of Brittany, Baroness of Drayton (1341 – aft. 20 October 1399), born at the onset of the War of the Breton Succession. When her brother returned to defend his claim as the duke of Brittany, Joan of Brittany stayed in England. She was married before 21 October 1385 to Ralph Basset, Baron Basset de Drayton

=== Question of succession ===
When Duke John III of Brittany died childless in 1341, he left behind a contentious succession dispute. For many years he tried to find means to ensure that the children of his stepmother, Yolande of Dreux would not inherit the duchy, including trying to have her marriage to his father annulled. At this time, he declared his heir to be his niece, Joan of Penthièvre.

Shortly before dying, Duke John III reconciled with his estranged half-brother, John of Montfort, with Duke John naming Montfort as his heir. Once John III died, a succession crisis became imminent as two rival factions formed:

- The House of Montfort, headed by John of Montfort and Joan of Flanders. Their legitimacy came from Duke John III's reconciliation with John shortly before his death. This claim was backed by the king of England, Edward III, who would benefit from the House of Montfort taking control of Brittany.
- The House of Blois, the house of Charles of Blois and his wife, Joan of Penthièvre. Their legitimacy came from the Duke's previous declaration that his heir would be Joan. Only shortly before the duke's death did he change who his successor would be, which raised questions of legitimacy directed at the House of Montfort. This claim was backed by the king of France, Philip VI, who benefited from his nephew Charles and the House of Blois controlling Brittany.

==== Diplomacy ====
In an attempt to resolve this question of succession, John of Montfort, Joan's husband, reached out to King Philip VI, the uncle of Charles of Blois. Due to the association of the House of Montfort with the English, and the House of Blois' association to the French, historians understand that John was working to avoid starting a conflict between the English and French. Philip promised John safe conduct and invited him to Paris to be heard. Once in Paris, John was quickly imprisoned and the French courts declared Joan of Penthièvre and her husband Charles of Blois to be the heirs of Brittany. This move spurred Joan's vengeance.

With her husband locked away, Joan announced her son—still an infant at the time—the rightful heir and leader of her faction. Mustering an army, she led her soldiers into the start of the War of Breton Succession.

=== War of Breton Succession ===
Beginning the war with a march on Redon, Charles of Blois arrived in 1342 and besieged the town Hennebont, where Joan was residing for the time being. At the same time, her enemy Charles of Blois besieged Joan and the House of Montfort. She responded by sending Amaury de Clisson to ask King Edward III of England for aid. Edward, in dire need to become allies with Brittany, found this opportunity impossible to ignore, and sent supplies to Joan to help relieve the siege.

Edward was eager to render aid, as he had been claiming the French crown for himself, and was therefore at odds with Philip. If he could get Brittany as an ally, it would be of great advantage for future campaigns. He prepared ships under the command of Sir Walter Manny to relieve the siege.

==== Siege of Hennebont ====
In the siege of Hennebont, she took up arms and, dressed in armor, conducted the defense of the town, encouraging the people to fight, and urging the women to "cut their skirts and take their safety in their own hands". When she looked from a tower and saw that the enemy camp was almost unguarded, she led three hundred men on a charge, burned down Charles' supplies and destroyed his tents. After this she became known as "Jeanne la Flamme". When the Blois faction realized what was happening, they cut off her retreat to the town, but she and her knights rode to Brest, drawing a portion of the Blois force with them. Having secured Brest, she gathered together extra supporters and secretly returned to Hennebont, evading the Blois forces and re-entering the town with her reinforcements.

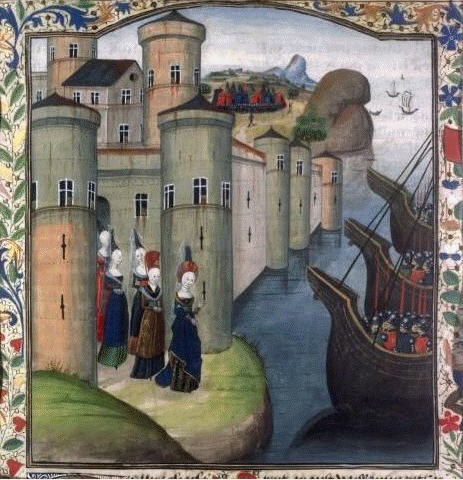
Joanna and her ladies greeting the English relief force

Charles of Blois tried to starve the people in Hennebont. During a long meeting the bishop of Leon tried to persuade Joan to surrender, but from the window she saw Walter Manny's fleet from England sailing up. Hennebont was strengthened with the English forces and held out. Charles was forced to retreat, but tried to isolate Joan by taking other towns in Brittany. On his return he again failed to capture Hennebont.

Joan began to move away from her sieges and began to focus more onto her fleet. Her focus on naval warfare led to her being described as a pirate.

==== Fighting at sea ====
Joan sailed to England to seek further reinforcements from King Edward, which he provided, but the English fleet was intercepted on its way to Brittany by Charles of Blois' ally, Louis of Spain. In a hard-fought battle, the sailors and knights grappled in hand-to-hand combat as Louis' men attempted to board Joan's ship. According to Froissart, Joan fought in person "with the heart of a lion, and in her hand she wielded a sharp glaive, wherewith she fought fiercely". Eventually the English forces beat off Louis's ships and made harbor near Vannes. Her forces then captured Vannes, besieged Rennes and sought to break the siege of Hennebont.

Joan of Flanders slowly started stepping further back away from the war front, which would have been expected for women of her position. English warlords slowly began taking more and more leadership and acted in her place: a duchess avenging her husband. With neither side able to achieve a decisive victory, by the truce of Malestroit in 1343, her husband John was released and hostilities ceased for a period. He was later imprisoned once again, but escaped and resumed the conflict. In the wake of her husband's death, Joan stepped up once more and became the leader of the Montfort house once more to protect the title for her son from the House of Blois. In 1347, English forces acting on her behalf captured Charles of Blois in battle.

=== Confinement ===
By this time Joan and her son were living in England. After being initially welcomed with honor, she was later confined by order of King Edward III and spent the rest of her life under house arrest at Tickhill Castle and elsewhere. Edward entrusted her to the care of Sir William Frank (until 1346), Thomas Haukeston (1346–57), John Delves (d. 1370) and finally to his widow Isabella and Godfrei Foljambe. Arthur de La Borderie attributed her confinement to mental illness, but some more recent research has argued that there is no evidence to support this. Notably, it seems unlikely that "Warmer" (Warnier?) de Giston, assisted by his yeoman, would have risked gravely compromising himself by taking her out of the castle in 1347 and attempting to flee with her if she were mentally ill. It is likely that Edward imprisoned her in order to increase his own power in Brittany.

She lived long enough to see the final victory of her son John IV over the House of Blois in 1364, but she never returned to the duchy. The last mention made of the duchess and her guardian is 14 February 1374, thus she may have died in that year.

== Legacy ==
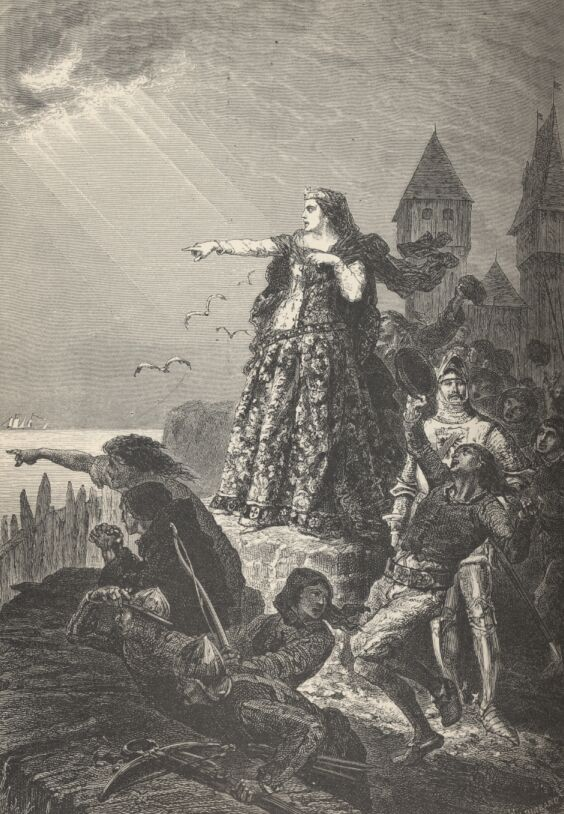
Joanna of Flanders spots the English fleet arriving to relieve Hennebont, 1342. Illus. from François Guizot's History of France, 1869

=== Legend ===
Joan became known as a prototype of the martial woman in Brittany, and may have been an inspiration for Joan of Arc. Jean Froissart said she "had the courage of a man and the heart of a lion". David Hume described her as "the most extraordinary woman of the age". Victorian feminists also cited her as a role-model. Harriet Taylor Mill mentions her as one of the "heroic chatelaines" of the Middle Ages in her essay "The Enfranchisement of Women". Amelia Bloomer also cites her as one of the "heroic women" of the era.

Pierce Butler said that she is "known to us, through the enthusiastic record of Froissart, as an amazon, but hardly known at all as a woman". He concluded,

In those qualities admired by chivalry she was unquestionably an extraordinary woman: courageous and personally valiant, with a head to plan daring exploits and a heart to conduct her through the thick of the danger; impulsive and generous, a free-handed ruler and an admirer of those deeds of chivalrous daring in others which she was so willing to share in herself ... One cannot read her story without enthusiasm, yet one would like to know more of the woman before bestowing unreserved praise on the countess "who was worth a man in a fight" and "who had the heart of a lion".

Joan was later celebrated for her fiery exploits in Breton folklore, in particular in a ballad collected in Barzaz Breiz, which relates her attack on the camp at Hennebont. In Jeanne Coroller-Danio's Breton nationalist book Histoire de Notre Bretagne (1922), Joan is depicted as a heroine of Breton resistance to French occupation.

== See also ==
- Timeline of women's participation in warfare
- List of women warriors in folklore
- List of wartime cross-dressers

== Sources ==
- Morvan, Frederic (2009). La Chevalerie bretonne et la formation de l'armee ducale (in French). Presses Universitaires de Rennes.
- Jones, Michael (1988). The Creation of Brittany. The Hambledon Press.

Preceded by Joan of Savoy	— DISPUTED — Duchess consort of Brittany; 1341–1345	Succeeded by Mary of Waltham
