= Robert III of Flanders =

Count of Flanders from 1305 to 1322

Robert III
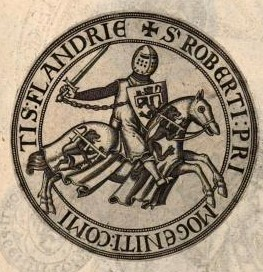
- Robert's effigy on his seal
- Born: 1249
- Died: 17 September 1322; Ypres
- Noble family: House of Dampierre
- Spouse: Blanche of Sicily (m. 1265; died 1269) Yolande II, Countess of Nevers (m. 1271; died 1280)
- Issue: Louis I, Count of Nevers
- Father: Guy of Dampierre
- Mother: Matilda of Béthune

Robert III (1249 – 17 September 1322), also called Robert of Béthune and nicknamed The Lion of Flanders (De Leeuw van Vlaanderen), was the Count of Nevers from 1273 and Count of Flanders from 1305 until his death.

== History ==
Robert was the oldest son of Guy of Dampierre from his first marriage with Matilda of Béthune. His father essentially transferred the reign of Flanders to him in November 1299, during his war with Philip IV of France. Both father and son were taken into captivity in May 1300, and Robert was not released until 1305.

Robert of Béthune gained military fame in Italy, when he fought at the side of his father-in-law, Charles I of Sicily (1265–1268) against the last Hohenstaufens, Manfred and Conradin. Together with his father he took part in 1270 in the Eighth Crusade, led by Saint Louis. After his return from the Crusade he continued to be a loyal aid for his father, politically and militarily, in the fight against the attempts of the French King Philip IV the Fair to add Flanders to the French crown lands.

Guy of Dampierre broke all feudal bonds with the French king (on 20 January 1297) mainly under his influence. When the resistance seemed hopeless Robert allowed himself to be taken prisoner, together with his father and his brother William of Crèvecoeur, and taken to the French King (May 1300). Shortly before that he had become the de facto ruler of Flanders. He was locked in the castle of Chinon. Contrary to popular belief, and the romantic portrayal by Hendrik Conscience in his novel about these events (The Lion of Flanders), he did not take part in the Battle of the Golden Spurs.

In July 1305, after his father had died in captivity, he was allowed to return to his county. The execution of the Treaty of Athis-sur-Orge would mark the rule of Count Robert. Initially, he achieved some success in moving the countryside and the cities to fulfill their duties. However, in April 1310 he started to radically resist the French, with support of his subjects and his family. Both diplomatically and militarily he managed to make a stand against the French king. In December 1318, King Edward II of England sent nobles to mediate between Count Robert and William I, Count of Hainaut, in order to ease the passage of trade. When Robert marched to Lille in 1319 the militia from Ghent refused to cross the Leie with him. When his grandson Louis I of Nevers pressured him as well, Robert gave up the battle and went to Paris in 1320 to restore feudal bonds with the French King.

But even after that, he would hamper the execution of the Treaty of Athis-sur-Orge to the point of being excommunicated. Robert died in 1322 and was succeeded by his grandson, Louis, Count of Nevers.

He was buried in Flanders in St Martin's Cathedral in Ypres, in accordance with his explicit wish to be buried on Flemish soil. His body was only allowed to be transferred to the abbey of Flines (near Douai) when Lille and Douai were again part of the County of Flanders. His first wife and his father were also buried in this abbey.

== Family ==
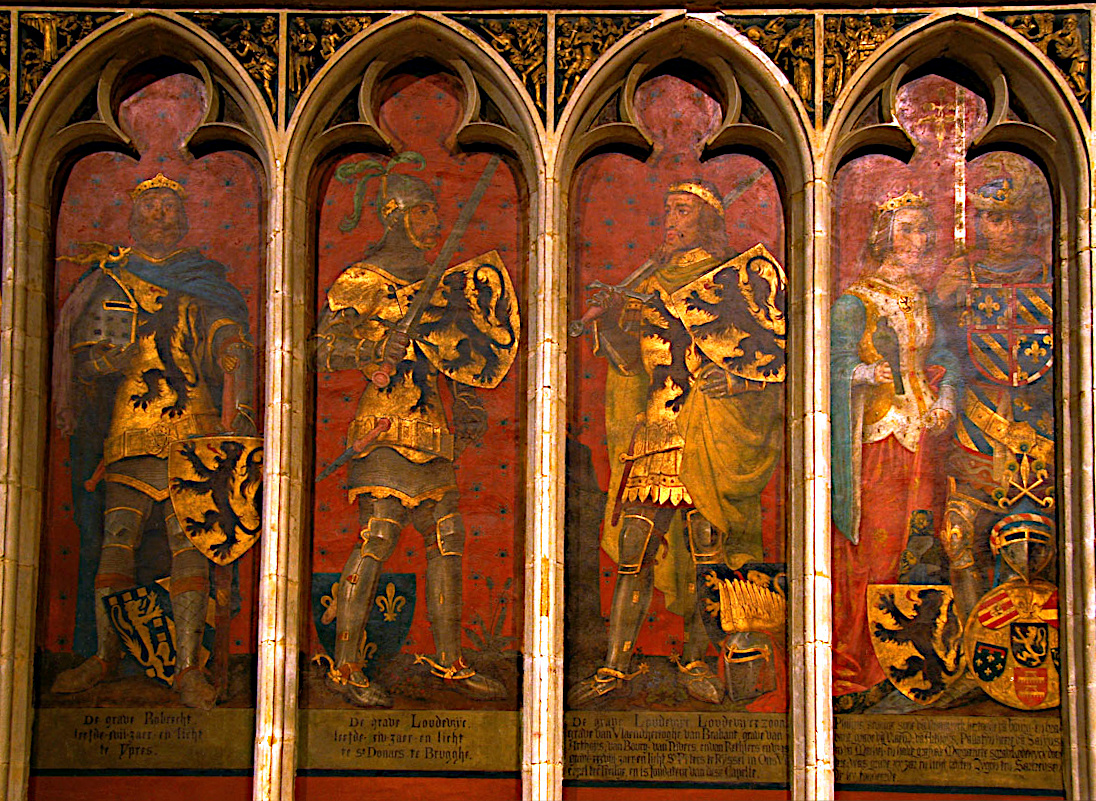
Robert (left) depicted with his three immediate successors: grandson Louis I, great-grandson Louis II, and great-great-granddaughter Margaret III with her husband Philip of Burgundy

Robert married twice. His first wife was Blanche (d. 1269), daughter of Charles I of Sicily and Beatrice of Provence, in 1265. They had one son, Charles, who died young.

His second wife was Yolande II, Countess of Nevers (d. 11 June 1280), daughter of Odo, Count of Nevers, in c. 1271. They had five children:

- Louis (b. 1272, d. 24 July 1322, Paris), Count of Nevers, married December 1290 Joan, Countess of Rethel (d. aft. 12 March 1328). Their son was Louis I of Flanders.
- Robert (d. 1331), Count of Marle, married c. 1323 Joan of Brittany (1296 - 24 March 1363), Lady of Nogent-le-Rotrou, daughter of Arthur II, Duke of Brittany. Their children were:

- John, Seigneur of Cassel (d. 1332)
- Yolande (c.1320–1395), married Henry IV of Bar in 1340.

- Jeanne (d. 15 October 1333), married 1288 Enguerrand IV, Lord of Coucy (d. 1310), Viscount of Meaux.
- Yolande (d. 1313), married c. 1287 Walter II of Enghien (d. 1309).
- Matilda, married c. 1314 Matthias of Lorraine (d. c. 1330), Lord of Warsberg.

== Sources ==
- Earp, Lawrence (1996). Guillaume de Machaut: A Guide to Research. Garland Publishing.
- Fegley, Randall (2002). The Golden Spurs of Kortrijk: How the Knights of France Fell to the Foot Soldiers of Flanders in 1302. McFarland & Co.
- Leson, Richard A. (2011). "Heraldry and Identity in the Psalter-Hours of Jeanne of Flanders (Manchester, John Rylands Library, MS LAT. 117)". Studies in Iconography. 32.
- Lucas, Henry S. (1946). "The Low Countries and the Disputed Imperial Election of 1314". Speculum. 21 (1 (Jan.)).
- Maxwell, H.C. (1895). "Close Rolls, Edward II: December 1318 Pages 117-119 Calendar of Close Rolls, Edward II: Volume 3, 1318-1323. Originally published by Her Majesty's Stationery Office, London". British History Online.
- Morganstern, Anne McGee (2000). Gothic Tombs of Kinship in France, the Low Countries, and England. The Pennsylvania State University Press.
- Pollock, M. A. (2015). Scotland, England and France After the Loss of Normandy, 1204-1296: "Auld Amitie". The Boydell Press.
- TeBrake, William H. (1993). A Plague of Insurrection: Popular Politics and Peasant Revolt in Flanders, 1323-1328. University of Pennsylvania Press.
- Verbruggen, J.F. (2002). Devries, Keely (ed.). The Battle of the Golden Spurs. Translated by Ferguson, D.R.

Robert III of Flanders House of Dampierre Born: 1249 Died: 17 September 1322
| Preceded by Yolande II | Count of Nevers; 1272–1280 with Yolande II | Succeeded by Louis I |
| Preceded by Guy | Count of Flanders; 1305–1322 | Succeeded by Louis I |
