= Hochstaden =

Medieval Rhenish county

Hochstaden was a medieval county in the Rhineland. It existed from the 11th to the 13th century. After the extinction of a senior line, a junior line was created by marital connection with the counts of Are-Hochstaden. After the main line Are died out, their property fell to the high Stader line. Finally, Archbishop Konrad von Hochstaden and his brother bequeathed the property to the Cologne archbishopric.

== History ==
The origin was the early medieval Motte of Husterknupp northwest of Cologne. Hardly anything is known about the early owners and since the Middle Ages the castle had already disappeared. The last remnants were destroyed by lignite mining.

The counts of Hochstaden date back to Gerhard I. This is attested for the period 1074-1096. His mother possibly came from the Ezzonen. His father was probably Gerhard Wassenberg. Gerhard I and his father were sometimes referred to as "princes", a status that was beyond a simple count. The origin of his wife is unknown.

His brother was Cologne Archbishop Hermann III. of Hochstaden. This older line died out with Gerhard II, in 1149. The heiress of Hochstaden and Wickrath Adelheid married Otto von Are in about 1167. From then, the ownership of Hochstaden was in the hands of the family of Are. After the death of the father of Otto Dietrich I von Are the inheritance was divided. The lines Are, Nürburg and Hochstaden emerged. After the death of Otto the line of Hochstaden was also divided. In addition to the main line Hochstaden there was a line Wickerode. Between 1283 and 1331 a Cologne canon named Heinrich became extinct.

About the throne of the Holy Roman Empire, the counts of Hochstaden supported the Guelph side against Frederick II.

The line Hochstaden possessed this region after the death of Theodoric II, The last representatives of the senior line of Are. This line-Are Hochstaden came to Archbishop Konrad and his brother Friedrich (ruling 1228-1265). After her nephew Theodoric and Gerhard had died childless, his brothers, from the archbishopric of Cologne, including Neuenahr, Altenahr, Heimbach, Hardthöhe and Nürburg took over the possession.

== Genealogy ==
=== Senior line ===
- Gerhard I. († after 1096)
  - Gerhard II. († after 1145)
    - Adelheid († before 1162), married to Otto Graf von Are († before 1162).
- Hermann III. († November 21, 1099)

=== Junior Line ===
- Adelheid and Otto von Are
  - Otto († after 1208), the founder of the line Wickrath
  - Lothar, Bishop of Liège
  - Dietrich († 1194 or 1197), married to Liuitgart von Dagsburg
    - Lothar I. († after 1215), married with Mathilde of Vianden
      - Lothar II. († 1237 or 1242)
        - Dietrich († 1246)
        - Gerhard († 1242 or 1245)
      - Konrad († September 18, 1261), Archbishop of Cologne
      - Friedrich († 1265)
      - Elisabeth, married to Eberhard von Hengebach
      - Mechthild († after 1243), married to Konrad von Müllenark
      - Margareta (1220-1314), married to Adolf VII of Berg.
