= Louis I of Nevers =

Count of Nevers and Rethel (1272–1322)

Louis I
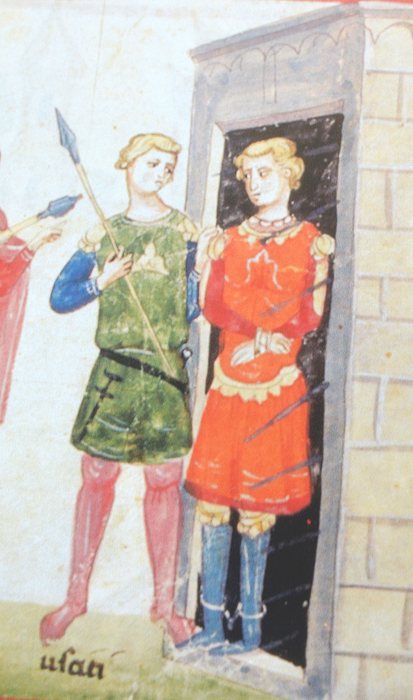
- Count Louis (right)

Count of Nevers
- Born: 1272
- Died: 22 July 1322; Paris
- Noble family: House of Dampierre
- Spouse: Joan, Countess of Rethel
- Issue: Joanna, Duchess of Brittany; Louis I, Count of Flanders
- Father: Robert III, Count of Flanders
- Mother: Yolande II, Countess of Nevers

Louis I (1272 – 22 July 1322) was suo jure count of Nevers and jure uxoris count of Rethel.

Louis was a son of Count Robert III of Flanders, and Countess Yolande of Nevers. He succeeded his parents as Count of Nevers. In December 1290, he married Countess Joan of Rethel, and thus became her co-ruler in the County of Rethel. They had two children:

- Joan of Flanders
- Louis I, Count of Flanders, Nevers and Rethel

He died in Paris shortly before his father and thus never succeeded his father as Count of Flanders.

Louis I of Nevers House of Dampierre Born: 1272 Died: 22 July 1322
French nobility
| Preceded by Yolande; Robert | Count of Nevers; 1280–1322 | Succeeded by Louis I |
| Preceded by Joan as sole ruler | Count of Rethel; 1290–1322 | Succeeded by Joan as sole ruler |
