= Walter of Rethel =

French nobleman

Walter, Count of Rethel
- Died: 1262
- Father: Hugh II, Count of Rethel
- Mother: Felicitas of Broyes

Walter, Count of Rethel (d. 1262 was a French nobleman. He was a younger son of Count Hugh II of Rethel and his wife, Felicitas of Broyes. In 1251, he succeeded his brother John as the ruling count of Rethel. No marriage or children are known.

Walter died in 1262, and was succeeded by his youngest brother, Manasses V.

Walter of Rethel Died: 1262
Preceded by John	Count of Rethel; 1251–1262	Succeeded by Manasses V
