= Heinrich I von Müllenark =

Heinrich I von Müllenark (also Mulnarken) (1190–1238) was the Archbishop of Cologne within the Holy Roman Empire from 1225 until 1237.

== Life ==
Little is known of Heinrich's life before being elected archbishop. Before he was appointed Provost in Bonn, he was called by the surname "Leinenhose".

Heinrich was elected Archbishop of Cologne on 15 November 1225, one week after the murder of the previous archbishop, Engelbert I of Berg. Heinrich set out immediately to punish the conspirators in the murder, and he received necessary rights and equipment from the Holy Roman Emperor, Frederick II, and Pope Honorius III. A bounty of 2,000 silver marks was placed on the head of the lead conspirator, Frederick I of Isenberg, and his castles were besieged and captured. After travelling to Rome to have his excommunication lifted, Frederick was captured in Liège and sold to Cologne, where he was executed on 14 November 1226 at the Severin Gate.

Heinrich continued the policy of his predecessors to increase the power and territories of the archbishopric. He entered into long and costly conflicts with the counts of Mark and Cleves, and the city of Cologne. He was forced to concede the weakness of the prince-bishopric, and he had to recognise municipal rights on several Westphalian towns. Despite the temporal failures of Heinrich's reign, spiritually Cologne flourished.

Heinrich was excommunicated in 1233.

Heinrich was interred in Cologne Cathedral after his death.

Heinrich von Müllenarken Born: ca. 1190 Died: 26 March 1238 in Cologne
Catholic Church titles
Regnal titles
Preceded by Engelbert I von Berg	Archbishop of Cologne and Duke of Westphalia and Angria as Henry I 1225–1237	Succeeded by Konrad von Hochstaden
