= Manasses V of Rethel =

French noble

Manasses V, Count of Rethel
- Died: 1272
- Spouse: Elisabeth of Écry
- Issue: Hugh IV; Maria
- Father: Hugh II, Count of Rethel
- Mother: Felicitas of Broyes

Manasses V, Count of Rethel (died 1273) was the youngest son of Count Hugh II and his wife, Felicitas of Broyes.

In 1262, he succeeded his brother Walter as Count of Rethel.

Manasses V was married to Elisabeth of Écry and was the father of:

- Hugh IV (1244–1285)
- Maria (1231–1315), married Walter I, Count of Enghien

Manasses V of Rethel Died: 1272
Preceded by Walter	Count of Rethel; 1262–1272	Succeeded by Hugh IV
