= Albert of Louvain =

Saint Albert of Louvain
- Bishop of Liège
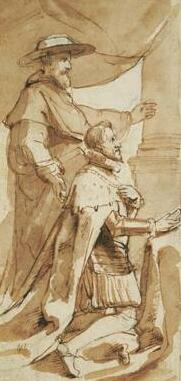
- Church: Catholic Church
- Diocese: Liège
- See: Liège
- Appointed: 8 September 1191
- Installed: May 1192
- Term ended: 24 November 1192
- Successor: Hugo Pierrepont

Orders
- Ordination: 19 September 1192 by Guillaume de Champagne
- Consecration: 20 September 1192 by Guillaume de Champagne
- Created cardinal: May 1192 by Pope Celestine III
- Rank: Cardinal-Deacon (no diaconate assigned)

Personal details
- Born: Albert de Louvain c. 1166 Louvain, County of Brabant
- Died: 24 November 1192 (aged 26) Reims, Champagne-Ardenne, France

Sainthood
- Feast day: 24 November
- Venerated in: Catholic Church
- Canonized: 9 August 1613; Rome, Papal States by Pope Paul V
- Attributes: Cardinal's attire, three swords
- Shrines: Cathedral of Liège, Belgium

Albert of Louvain (1166 – 24 November 1192) was a cardinal of the Catholic Church and the Prince-Bishop of Liège. He was canonized as a saint on 9 August 1613 and his feast falls on the date of his death.

== Biography ==
Albert de Louvain was born in 1166 as the second of two sons to Duke Godfrey III, Count of Leuven, and his first wife Margareta van Limburg. He was the brother of Henry I, Duke of Brabant.

Albert was educated at the cathedral school of Saint-Lambert in Liège. In 1187, when news of the fall of Jerusalem reached Liege, Albert resigned his offices, took the cross, and had himself knighted. The following year Cardinal Henry of Albano restored his ecclesiastical status.

In 1188, he became the Archdeacon of Liège and later received the subdiaconate in 1191. That same year he was elected Bishop of Liège and despite the fact that he had not reached the canonical age of 30, his appointment was widely approved. Gilbert of Mons, chancellor of Count Baldwin V of Hainaut, who attended the election, along with other princes and nobles, described the proceedings as a power struggle between Albert's brother Henry and Baldwin.

Albert's appointment was opposed by Baldwin, who had a second group of canons elect his own relative, Albert de Rethel. Albert de Rethel was a maternal-uncle of Empress Constance who had planned to support him with the Emperor but had been captured by Sicilians earlier. As the election appeared to be in dispute, the Emperor supported Lothar of Hochstaden, provost of the church of St Cassius in Bonn and brother of Count Dietrich of Hochstaden.

Albert took the matter to Rome and appealed to Pope Celestine III. In May 1192, Pope Celestine III made Albert a cardinal, and ordained him in Rome as a deacon on 30 May 1192. He was then ordained to the priesthood on 19 September 1192 by Cardinal Guillaume de Champagne. He received episcopal consecration the next day and celebrated his first mass on 21 September in the Reims Cathedral.

Assassination of Albert, from a copy of Le Livre des Cronicques de Brabant (1470s)

Albert met three German knights in 1192 who persuaded him to ride on horseback with them outside of Reims. Outside of the city they attacked Albert with their swords and struck him on the head which crushed his skull and caused him to fall, where they made sure they killed him prior to making an escape. He was buried at the cathedral of Reims.

== Aftermath ==
The immediate reaction to the murder was an uprising of the princes of Lower Lorraine led by the dukes of Brabant and Limburg, brother and uncle respectively of the slain bishop. They formed a group that eventually came to include the archbishops of Cologne and Mainz and other princes, and laid waste the territory of Dietrich of Hochstaden. Faced with the hostility of the people of Liège, Bishop-elect Lothar fled to the imperial court. He was excommunicated by Pope Celestine. The assassins, including one Otto of Barenste, fled to the imperial court, where Henry seems to have taken no particular action against them. Historians are divided as to the part the Emperor may or may not have played in planning the murder of the Bishop Albert.

== Canonization ==
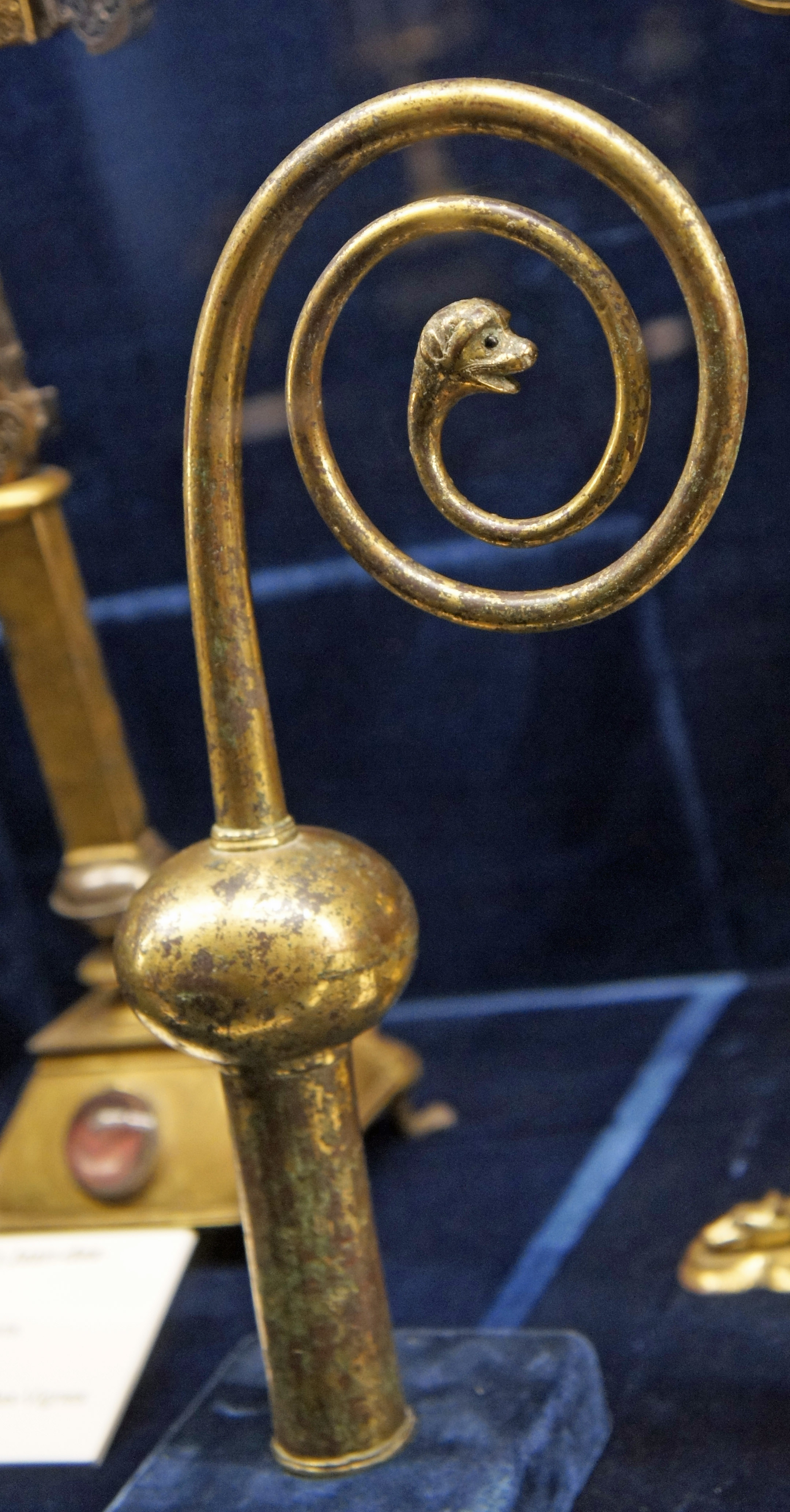
His crosier

The reputation of the holiness of Albert de Louvain soon spread after his death and was hailed as a martyr, thus, leading to the opening of his cause for canonization. Pope Paul V canonized him on 9 August 1613 and instituted his feast day as the date of his death. His body reposed at Rheims until 1921, when it was moved to Brussels. The Canadian city of St. Albert, Alberta, was named in his honor.

== Sources ==
The Vita Alberti episcopi Leodiensis was probably written around 1194 or 1195 by an anonymous monk of Lobbes, from information supplied by Abbot Werrich, who knew Albert well. Although a panegyric for the murdered bishop, Raymond H. Schmandt considers it generally accurate. A different viewpoint is found in the Chronicon Hanoniense of Gislebert of Mons, written shortly after 1196.
