= County and Duchy of Rethel =

County and after 1581 duchy in the Kingdom of France

Coat of arms of the County of Rethel.

The County of Rethel (French: Comté de Rethel), promoted to Duchy of Rethel (French: Duché de Rethel) in 1581 and finally the Duchy of Mazarin (French: Duché de Mazarin) after 1659, was a historic county in the French region of Ardennes. Its capital was the city of Rethel. The duchy was abolished due to the French Revolution in 1789.

== History ==
Originally, the city belonged to the Abbey of Saint-Remi and was administered by its advocati. One of them, Manasses I, became the first Count of Rethel and he was the first member of the House of Rethel.

In 1481 the county, with Rethel as its seat, was elevated to the Peerage of France and, finally, in 1581, it was elevated to a duchy, the Duchy of Rethel.

In 1659, the last duke of the House of Gonzaga-Nevers, Charles of Gonzaga-Nevers, (Note: which was also duke of Nevers, of Mayenne, prince of Arches and Sovereign duke of Mantua and of Montferrat.) sold the duchy of Rethel to the Cardinal Mazarin, prime-minister of king Louis XIV and the country was, then, renamed as the Duchy of Mazarin, and the title was the Duke of Mazarin.

The last duchess Mazarin, Louise d'Aumont (1759–1826), married in 1771 Honoré IV Grimaldi, Prince of Monaco.

The French First Republic abolished the duchy after the French Revolution in 1789.

== See also ==
- Counts and Dukes of Rethel
- Rethel

== Sources ==
- The county of Rethel and his counts (in French)
