= Konrad von Hochstaden =

Archbishop of Cologne (d. 1261)

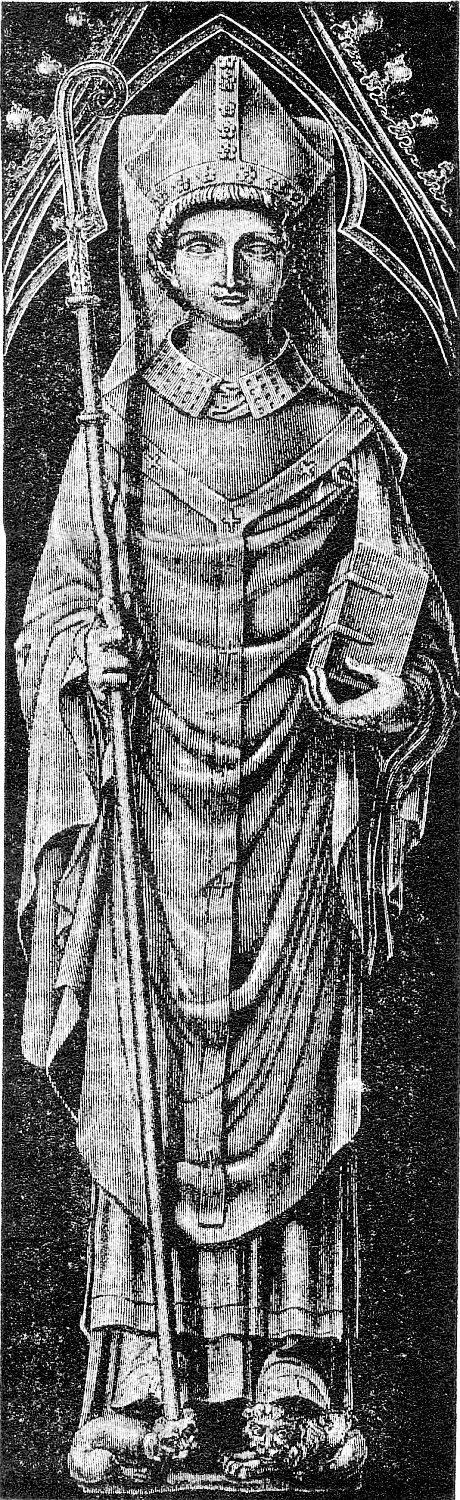
Konrad von Hochstaden

Konrad von Hochstaden (or Conrad of Hochstadt) (1198/1205 – 18 September 1261) was Archbishop of Cologne from 1238 to 1261.

Konrad was a son of Count Lothar of Hochstadt, canon of St. Maria ad Gradus and of the old Cologne Cathedral, and Mathilde of Vianden. His date of birth is unknown, and nothing is known of his early youth. In 1216, he became incumbent of the parish of Wevelinghoven near Düsseldorf; in 1226 he was canon and, some years later, provost of the cathedral of Cologne. After the death of Heinrich von Müllenark (26 March 1238) the cathedral chapter elected Konrad Archbishop of Cologne. He received the archiepiscopal insignia from the Emperor Frederick II at Brescia in August of the same year. The following year, on 28 October, he was ordained priest and consecrated archbishop by Ludolf von Holte, Bishop of Münster.

For the first few months of his reign, the new archbishop sided with the emperor in his conflict with Pope Gregory IX, but for unknown reasons went over to the papal party shortly after the emperor's excommunication (12 March 1239). The whole temporal administration of Konrad was a series of struggles with neighbouring princes and the citizens of Cologne, who refused to acknowledge the temporal sovereignty of the archbishop over their city. Konrad was generally victorious, but his often treacherous manner of warfare has left many dark spots on his reputation. When Pope Innocent IV deposed Frederick II (17 July 1245), it was chiefly due to the influence of Konrad that the pope's candidate, Henry Raspe, Landgrave of Thuringia, was elected king; when Henry died after a short reign of seven months (17 February 1247), it was again the influence of Konrad that placed the crown on the head of the youthful William of Holland.

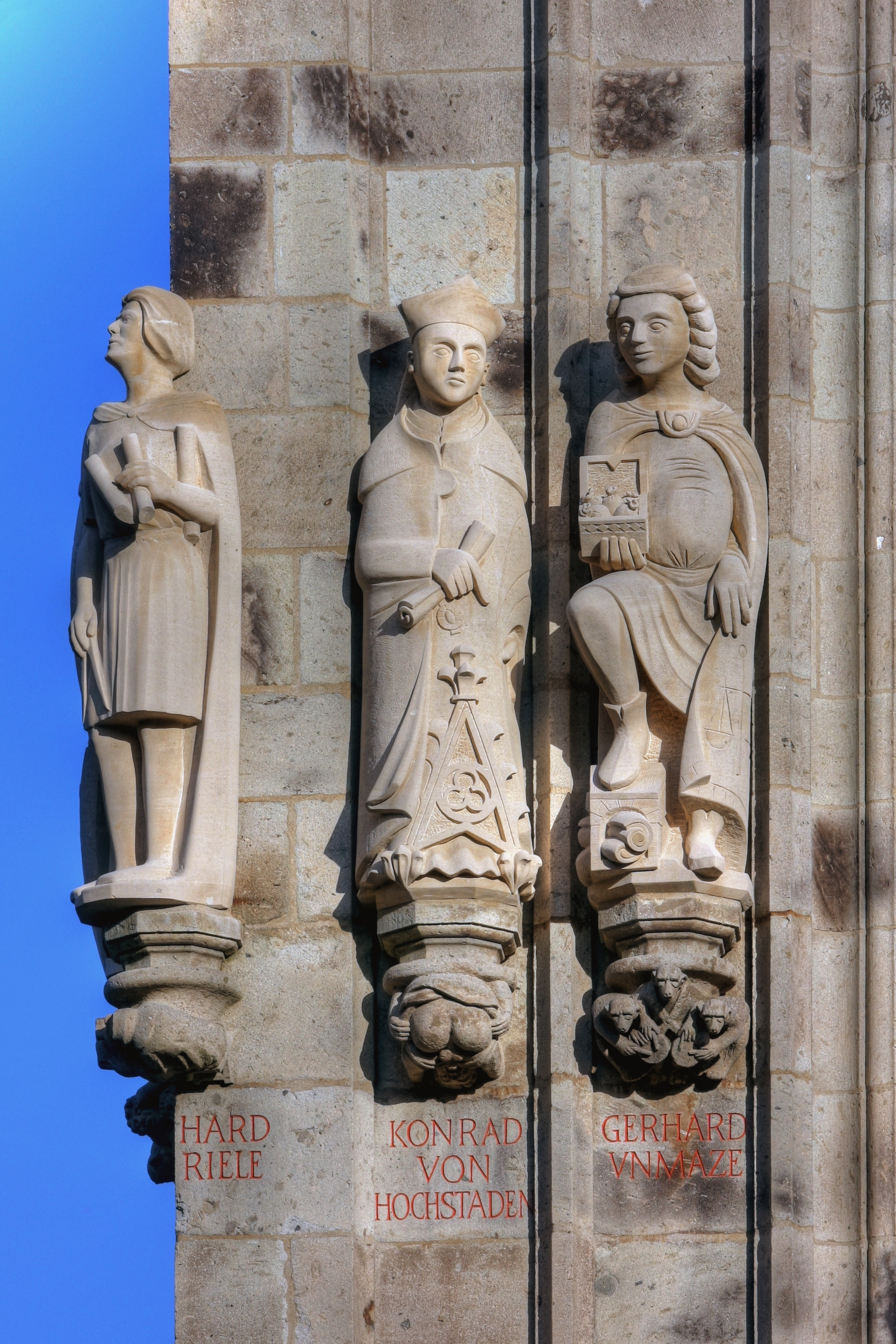
Konrad von Hochstaden at the tower of Cologne City Hall

In recognition of these services, Pope Innocent made him Apostolic legate in Germany (14 March 1249), an office which had become vacant by the death of Archbishop Siegfried III of Mainz, five days previously. The clergy and laity of Mainz desired to have the powerful Konrad of Cologne as their new archbishop. Konrad seems to have secretly encouraged them, but for diplomatic reasons referred them to the pope, who kindly but firmly refused to place the two most important ecclesiastical provinces of Germany under the power of one man.

Shortly after this decision, the hitherto friendly relations between Pope Innocent IV and the archbishop ceased and, in April 1250, the Apostolic legation in Germany was committed to Pierre de Colmieu, Bishop of Albano. At the same time began Konrad's estrangement from King William, which finally led to open rebellion. With all the means of a powerful and unscrupulous prince, Konrad attempted to dethrone William and probably would have succeeded had not the king's premature death made the archbishop's intrigues unnecessary. After the death of King William (28 January 1256), Konrad played an important role in the election of the new king. He sold his vote for a large sum to Richard of Cornwall, brother of Henry III of England, and crowned him at Aachen on 17 May 1257. This was the last important act of Konrad. He died on 28 September 1261 and is buried in the Cologne Cathedral, of which he laid the cornerstone on 15 August 1248.

Conrad of Hochstadt/Hochstaden Counts of Hochstaden Born: around 1198/1205 Died: 18 September 1261
Catholic Church titles
Regnal titles
Preceded by Heinrich I von Müllenark	Archbishop-Elector of Cologne and Duke of Westphalia and Angria as Conrad I 1238–1261	Succeeded by Engelbert II von Falkenstein
