= Hugh IV of Rethel =

Hugh IV

Count of Rethel
- Born: 1244
- Died: 1285 (aged 40–41)
- Spouses: Agnes of Chiny; Marie of Enghien; Isabella of Grandpré
- Issue: Jeanne, Countess of Rethel
- Father: Manasses V, Count of Rethel
- Mother: Elisabeth of Écry

Hugh IV (1244–1285) was a son of Manasses V and his wife, Isabelle of Écry. In 1272, he succeeded his father as Count of Rethel.

Hugues IV was married to:

- Agnes of Chiny
- Marie of Enghien
- Isabelle of Grandpré

With Isabelle, he had a daughter, Joan, who succeeded him.

== Sources ==
- Evergates, Theodore (2007). The Aristocracy in the Count of Champagne, 1100-1300. University of Pennsylvania Press.
- Vanderkindere, Léon (1899). "Histoire de la formation territoriale des principautés belges au moyen âge : La Flandre". Bulletin de la Commission royale d'Histoire (in French). Librairie Kiessling et Cie: 1–195.

Hugh IV of Rethel Born: 1244 Died: 1285
Preceded by Manasses V	Count of Rethel; 1272–1285	Succeeded by Joan
