= Lothar von Hochstaden =

Lothar von Hochstaden (died 1194 in Rome) was Bishop of Liège and archchancellor.

== Background ==
He came from the family of the Counts of Hochstaden. Lothar von Hochstaden was the brother of the Dietrich von Are-Hochstaden of Hohenstaufen. He was provost of St. Cassius in Bonn and St. Servatius in Maastricht, and dean of St. Lambertus in Liège. After the death of Archbishop Philip I of Cologne, the cathedral chapter at the end of 1191 elected him as the new archbishop. However, the Count of Berg forced him to give up. Then Bruno von Berg was chosen as the new archbishop.

In January 1192 the Emperor Henry VI made him archchancellor and bishop of Liège, where there had recently been a contentious election in which both parties were supported by various Flemish nobles. One possible aim of the Emperor was to establish a power base in the Lower Rhine region. Baldwin V of Hainault accepted the appointment but Henry I of Brabant refused. The originally chosen bishop, Albert of Leuven, a brother of Henry of Brabant, obtained from the Pope Celestine III confirming his episcopal dignity and was consecrated September 19, 1192 to Reims. Then, leaning on Henry VI, Lothar and Baldwin took action against Albert, who was killed on 24 November in front of German knights of Reims. Lothar was blamed for Albert's death. Though he swore his innocence in an oath, the Pope took him with excommunication and released him from his episcopate. Lothar then traveled to Rome. He was released from the spell, but had to abandon the diocese of Liège. To regain his full acquittal, he went in 1194 again to Rome, where he died the same year.

== Notes ==
- Peter Csendes: Heinrich VI., Primus Verlag Darmstadt 1993. ISBN 3-89678-023-9
