= Counts and dukes of Rethel =

Rulers of Rethel

The first rulers of Rethel might have governed under the Abbey of Saint-Remi and later independently, before the county passed first to the counts of Nevers, then to the counts of Flanders, and finally to the dukes of Burgundy. In 1405 the county became part of the peerage of France, and in 1581 it was elevated to a duchy. In 1663 it became the Duchy of Mazarin.

The county was active in the crusades. King Baldwin II of Jerusalem was the brother of Count Gervais and Countess Matilda of Rethel, while Beatrice of Rethel married Leo I, Prince of Armenia.

== Rethel Dynasty ==
- Manasses I
- Manasses II (?–1032)
- Manasses III (1032–1056)
- Hugh I (1065–1118)
- Gervais (1118–1124)
- Matilda (1124–1151)

== Vitre Dynasty ==
- Odo of Vitry (1124–1158), married Matilda of Rethel
- Ithier (1158–1171)
- Manasses IV (1171–1199)
- Hugh II (1199–1227)
- Hugh III (1227–1242)
- John (1242–1251)
- Walter (1251–1262)
- Manasses V (1262–1272)
- Hugh IV (1272–1285)
- Joan (1285–1328)

== Dampierre dynasty ==
- Louis I (1285–1322; married Joan; also count of Nevers)
- Louis II (1322–1346; also count of Flanders and Nevers; married Margaret, countess of Artois)
- Louis III (1346–1384; also count of Flanders, Nevers, and Artois)
- Margaret (1384–1402; also countess of Flanders, Nevers, Artois, and duchess of Burgundy)

== Burgundian dynasty ==
- Philip the Bold (1384–1402; also duke of Burgundy; married Margaret of Dampierre)
- Antoine (1402–1407; later duke of Brabant)
- Philip II (1407–1415; also count of Nevers)
- Charles I (1415–1464; also count of Nevers)
- John II (1464–1491; also count of Nevers and Eu)
- Charlotte (1491–1500)

== Albret dynasty ==
Coat of Arms of the Lords of Orval from the Albret family.

- John of Albret (1491–1500; also lord of Orval; married Charlotte of Rethel)
- Marie of Albret (1500–1549)

== Cleves dynasty ==
- Charles II (1500–1521; also count of Nevers; married Marie of Albret)
- François I (1549–1561; also duke of Nevers)
- François II (1561–1563; also duke of Nevers)
- Jacques (1563–1564; also duke of Nevers)
- Henriette of Cleves (1564–1601; also duchess of Nevers)

== Gonzaga dynasty ==
- Louis IV (1566–1595; married Henriette of Cleves; first duke of Rethel)
- Charles III (1595–1637; also duke of Nevers, Mantua, Montferrat, and Mayenne)
- Charles IV (1637–1659; also duke of Nevers, Mantua and Montferrat)

== House of Mazarin ==
- Jules Cardinal Mazarin (1659–1661); minister of Louis XIV of France; purchased Rethel from Charles IV
- Hortense Mancini (1661–1699); the niece of Cardinal Mazarin, Duchess of Mazarin, Duchess of Mayenne, Duchess of Meilleraye, mistress of Charles II of England
- Paul-Jules de la Porte (1699–1731; also Duke of Meilleraye)
- Paul de la Porte (1731–1738; also Duke of Meilleraye)
- Louise Jeanne de Durfort (1738–1781; also Duchess of Mayenne and Meilleraye)
- Louise d'Aumont (1781–1789; also Duchess of Mayenne and Meilleraye)

Nowadays, the title is still claimed by her descendants, the Sovereign Princes of Monaco.

== Bibliography ==
- Alan V. Murray, The crusader Kingdom of Jérusalem, A Dynastic History 1099-1125, Linacre College Oxford, 2000, ISBN 1-900934-03-5
