= Rethel =

- Subprefecture and commune
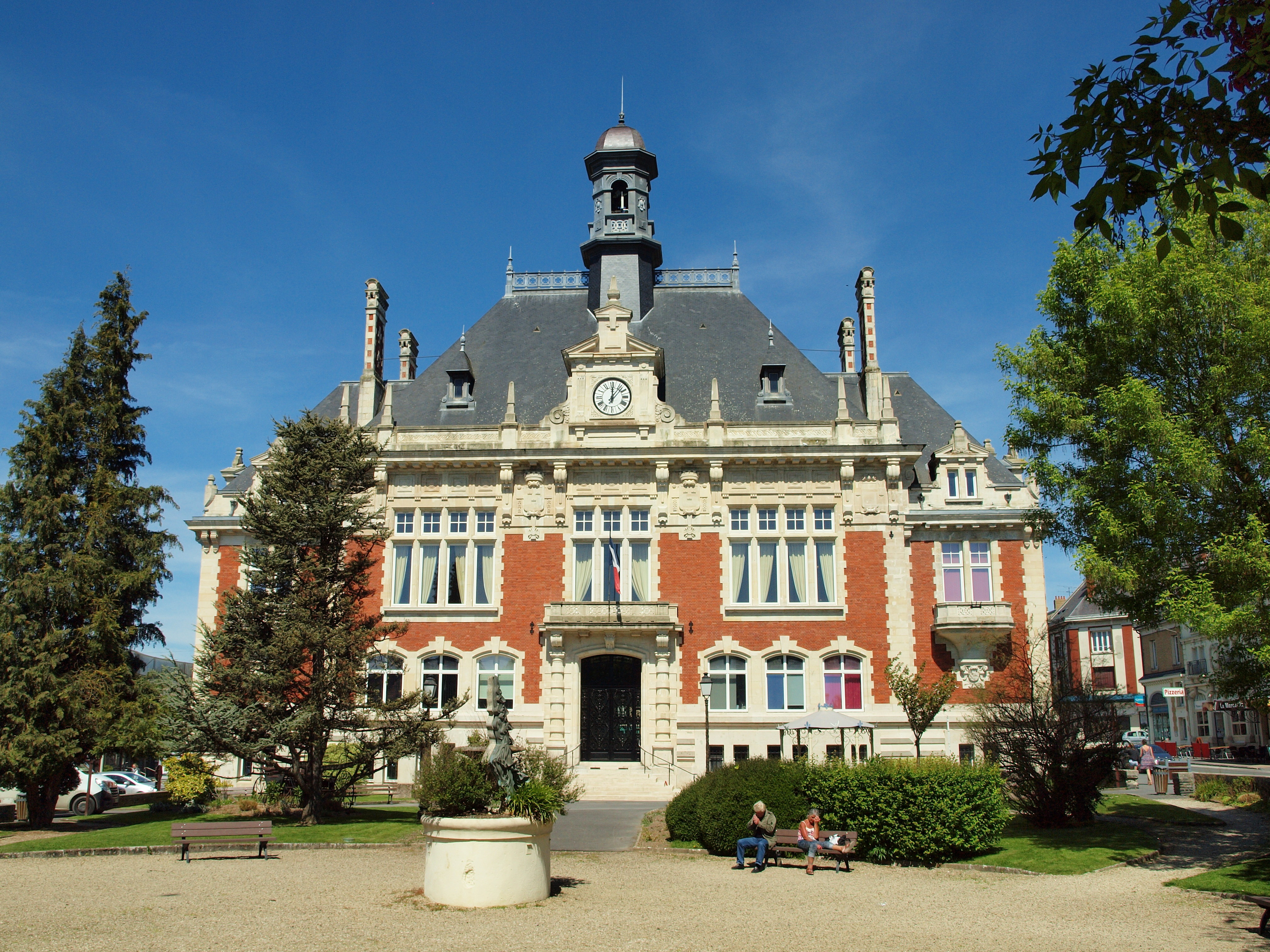
- Town hall

- Coat of arms
- Location of Rethel
- Location within France Location within Grand Est
- Coordinates: 49°30′38″N 4°22′00″E
- Country: France
- Region: Grand Est
- Department: Ardennes
- Arrondissement: Rethel
- Canton: Rethel
- Intercommunality: Pays Rethélois

Government
  - Mayor (2020–2026): Joseph Afribo
- Area^{1}: 18.58 km^{2} (7.17 sq mi)
- Highest elevation: 146 m (479 ft)
- Lowest elevation: 67 m (220 ft)
- Population (2023): 7,444
  - Density: 400.6/km^{2} (1,038/sq mi)
- Time zone: UTC+01:00 (CET)
  - Summer (DST): UTC+02:00 (CEST)
- INSEE/Postal code: 08362 /08300
- Website: www.villederethel.fr
- ^{1} French Land Register data, which excludes lakes, ponds, glaciers > 1 km^{2} (0.386 sq mi or 247 acres) and river estuaries.

Rethel (French pronunciation: [ʁətɛl]) is a commune in the Ardennes department in northern France. It is a sub-prefecture and third-most important city and economic center in the department. It is situated on the river Aisne, near the northern border of Champagne and 37 km from Reims.

Its inhabitants are called Rethélois.

== History ==
The name Rethel possibly derives from the Latin Registestensis, the Roman name for the settlement. The city's coat of arms displays three rakes, suggesting a folk derivation from the Old French rastel, meaning 'rake'.

According to legend, the city was founded by Julius Caesar, who established a camp on the site of the city during his campaigns.

The parents of St. Arnulf of Metz were said to have given all they owned in villa Reistete (in the city of Rethel) to St. Remigius, bishop of Reims, so that their prayers for a child would be answered.

The city belonged to the Abbey of Saint-Remi and was administered by its advocati. One of them, Manasses I, became the first Count of Rethel. In 1481 the county, with Rethel as its seat, was elevated to the Peerage of France; it was elevated to a duchy in 1581 and in 1663 it became the Duchy of Mazarin.

During the Franco-Spanish War it was captured by Spanish forces under Louis de Bourbon, Prince of Condé on 30 October 1652 after a four-year siege, but was retaken by the French in July 1653.

In 1814 Spanish prisoners of war from the Napoleonic Wars introduced typhus to the city. Jean-Baptiste Reberotte-Labesse cared for the soldiers who were ill. Cholera epidemics occurred in 1832 and 1849, while typhoid fever ravaged the city in 1839, with an average of thirty deaths a day.

During World War II Rethel was the site of heavy combat from May to June 1940 during the Battle of France. French troops under Jean de Lattre de Tassigny repelled German assaults on the town for a month before it fell.

In 1974, Rethel absorbed the former commune Pargny-Resson.

== Population ==
Historical population

Year	Pop.	±% p.a.
1793	4,512	—
1800	4,985	+1.43%
1806	5,551	+1.81%
1821	5,351	−0.24%
1831	6,585	+2.10%
1836	6,771	+0.56%
1841	7,184	+1.19%
1846	7,581	+1.08%
1851	7,499	−0.22%
1866	7,400	−0.09%
1872	7,086	−0.72%
1876	7,415	+1.14%
1881	7,403	−0.03%
1886	7,432	+0.08%
1891	7,136	−0.81%
1896	6,742	−1.13%
1901	6,434	−0.93%
1906	5,708	−2.37%

Year	Pop.	±% p.a.
1911	5,187	−1.90%
1921	4,813	−0.75%
1926	5,940	+4.30%
1931	5,428	−1.79%
1936	5,662	+0.85%
1946	4,718	−1.81%
1954	5,686	+2.36%
1962	7,359	+3.28%
1968	7,804	+0.98%
1975	8,361	+0.99%
1982	8,339	−0.04%
1990	7,923	−0.64%
1999	8,052	+0.18%
2007	7,793	−0.41%
2012	7,724	−0.18%
2017	7,592	−0.34%
2023	7,444	−0.33%

Source: EHESS and INSEE (1968-2023)

== Personalities ==
Rethel was the birthplace of:

- Baldwin II of Jerusalem (1075–1131), King of Jerusalem
- Jacques Boucher de Crèvecœur de Perthes (1788–1868), archeologist and antiquary
- Louis Christophe François Hachette (1800–1864), publisher.
- Maurice Maillot (1906–1968), film and theater actor.

== Climate ==
Climate data for Rethel (1981–2010 normals, extremes 1959–2013)
Month	Jan	Feb	Mar	Apr	May	Jun	Jul	Aug	Sep	Oct	Nov	Dec	Year
Record high °C (°F)	16.2 (61.2)	20.1 (68.2)	25.2 (77.4)	29.5 (85.1)	33.0 (91.4)	37.5 (99.5)	38.0 (100.4)	40.7 (105.3)	34.4 (93.9)	28.7 (83.7)	20.7 (69.3)	16.0 (60.8)	40.7 (105.3)
Mean daily maximum °C (°F)	5.9 (42.6)	7.5 (45.5)	11.9 (53.4)	15.9 (60.6)	20.3 (68.5)	23.2 (73.8)	26.1 (79.0)	25.6 (78.1)	21.3 (70.3)	16.5 (61.7)	10.2 (50.4)	6.6 (43.9)	16.0 (60.8)
Daily mean °C (°F)	2.8 (37.0)	3.5 (38.3)	6.9 (44.4)	9.8 (49.6)	14.1 (57.4)	16.9 (62.4)	19.4 (66.9)	18.9 (66.0)	15.3 (59.5)	11.6 (52.9)	6.5 (43.7)	3.6 (38.5)	10.8 (51.4)
Mean daily minimum °C (°F)	−0.3 (31.5)	−0.5 (31.1)	1.9 (35.4)	3.7 (38.7)	7.9 (46.2)	10.6 (51.1)	12.7 (54.9)	12.3 (54.1)	9.2 (48.6)	6.6 (43.9)	2.7 (36.9)	0.6 (33.1)	5.7 (42.3)
Record low °C (°F)	−20.5 (−4.9)	−17.6 (0.3)	−11.6 (11.1)	−6.4 (20.5)	−3.0 (26.6)	−1.2 (29.8)	2.2 (36.0)	2.3 (36.1)	−1.3 (29.7)	−6.0 (21.2)	−11.0 (12.2)	−19.2 (−2.6)	−20.5 (−4.9)
Average precipitation mm (inches)	69.2 (2.72)	56.2 (2.21)	68.3 (2.69)	54.7 (2.15)	62.7 (2.47)	60.1 (2.37)	69.4 (2.73)	72.0 (2.83)	58.1 (2.29)	71.1 (2.80)	66.5 (2.62)	80.6 (3.17)	788.9 (31.06)
Average precipitation days (≥ 1.0 mm)	12.3	10.4	12.0	9.8	10.7	9.4	8.6	8.2	8.9	10.9	11.6	13.4	126.3
Source: Meteociel

== See also ==
- County and Duchy of Rethel
- Alfred Rethel (1816 to 1859), artist.
- L'Ardennais, an automobile manufactured in Rethel from 1901 to around 1903.
- Counts and dukes of Rethel
- Communes of the Ardennes department
