= Hilary of Chichester =

12th-century bishop of Chichester

Hilary
- Bishop of Chichester
- Appointed: July 1147
- Predecessor: Seffrid I
- Successor: John of Greenford
- Other post: Dean of Christchurch

Orders
- Consecration: 3 August 1147 by Theobald of Bec

Personal details
- Born: c. 1110
- Died: July 1169

Hilary (c. 1110–1169) was a bishop of Chichester in England. English by birth, he studied canon law and worked in Rome as a papal clerk. During his time there, he became acquainted with a number of ecclesiastics, including the future Pope Adrian IV, and the writer John of Salisbury. In England, he served as a clerk for Henry of Blois, who was the bishop of Winchester and brother of King Stephen of England. After Hilary's unsuccessful nomination to become Archbishop of York, Pope Eugene III compensated him by promoting him to the bishopric of Chichester in 1147.

Hilary spent many years in a struggle with Battle Abbey, attempting to assert his right as bishop to oversee the abbey. He also clashed with Thomas Becket, then chancellor to King Henry II of England, later Archbishop of Canterbury; Hilary supported King Henry II's position in the conflict with Becket. Henry appointed Hilary as sheriff and employed him as a judge in the royal courts. The papacy also used Hilary as a judge-delegate to hear cases referred back to England. Known for supporting his clergy and as a canon lawyer, or someone trained in ecclesiastical law, Hilary worked to have Edward the Confessor, a former English king, canonised as a saint.

== Early life ==
Hilary was probably born around 1110 and was likely of low birth, but nothing is known of his ancestry. His brother was a canon of Salisbury Cathedral, and they both may have come from around Salisbury. Hilary served as a clerk for Henry of Blois, Bishop of Winchester, and as dean of the church of Christchurch in Twynham, Hampshire (now Dorset), probably receiving both offices through the influence of Henry of Blois. Christchurch was a collegiate church of secular clergy, or clergy who were not monks, and Hilary was dean of the church by 1139. He was educated as a canon lawyer, and was an advocate, or lawyer, in Rome in 1144. While in Rome, he also served in the papal chancery, or writing office, in 1146. Some of his colleagues in the chancery were Robert Pullen, John of Salisbury, and Nicholas Breakspear, who later became pope, as Adrian IV.

As Dean of Christchurch, Hilary restored the organisation to its traditional round of religious ceremonies that had been abandoned by his predecessors, as well as securing grants of privileges and lands. He ordered the writing of a history of the church at Christchurch, a book which still survives. Hilary was unsuccessful as a candidate for the archbishopric of York against Henry Murdac in 1147, but Pope Eugene III chose to compensate him by appointing him to the see of Chichester. His candidacy to York had been supported by Hugh de Puiset, then treasurer of York and later Bishop of Durham, and by Robert of Ghent, who was Dean of York and Lord Chancellor of England, as well as by King Stephen of England. Hilary seems to have received the largest number of votes, but because the election was disputed by Murdac's supporters, the result was referred to the papacy, and Eugene chose Murdac. Hilary was appointed to Chichester in July 1147, and he was consecrated on 3 August 1147. Theobald of Bec, the Archbishop of Canterbury, consecrated him at Canterbury, with Nigel, the Bishop of Ely, Robert, the Bishop of Bath, and William de Turbeville, the Bishop of Norwich, assisting in the ceremony. For a number of years, Hilary continued to hold the deanship in plurality, which is the holding of two or more ecclesiastical benefices at once.

== Stephen's reign ==
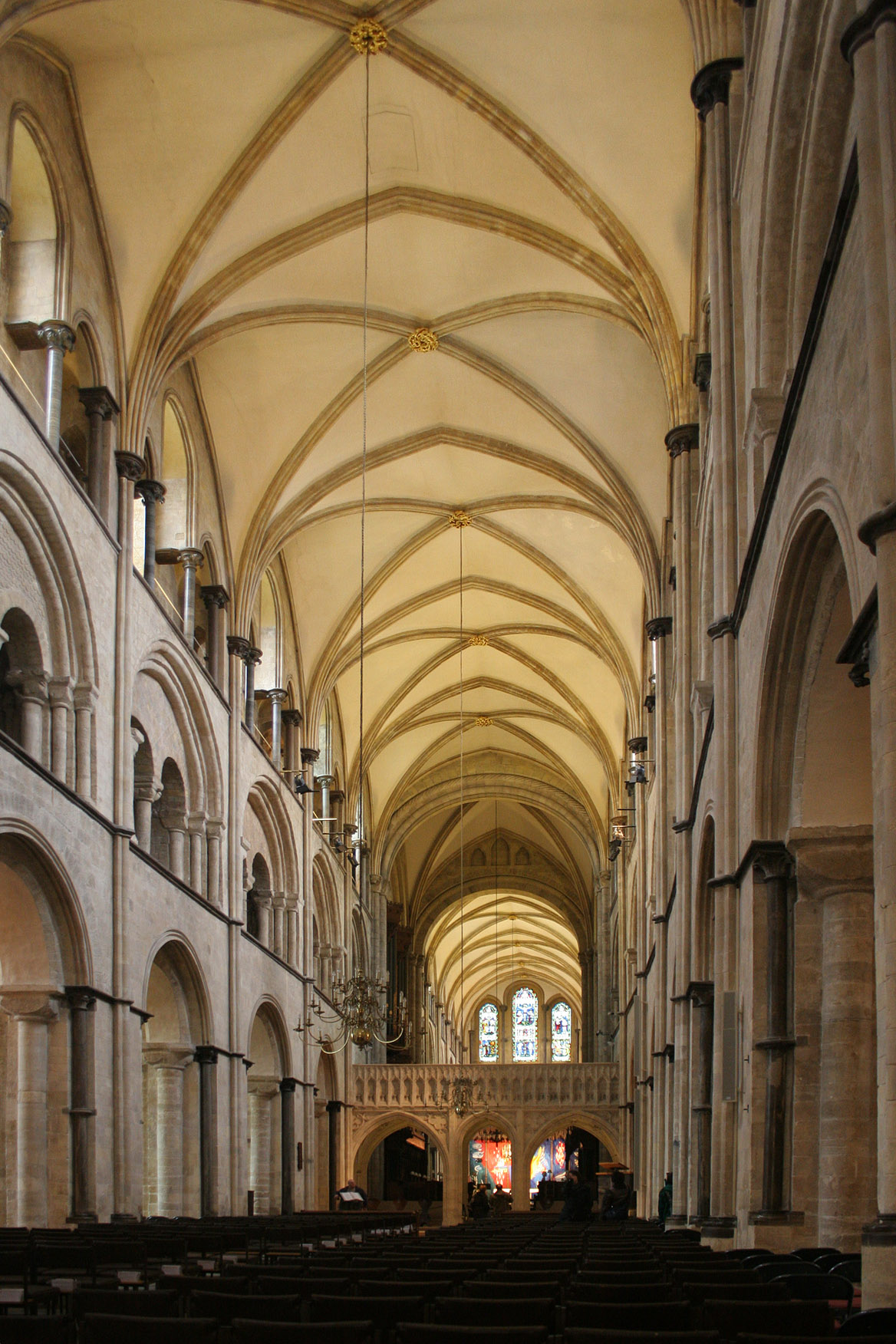
The interior of Chichester Cathedral, showing the Romanesque stonework. The interior was reworked after a fire in 1187, but the basic structure dates from before Hilary's episcopate.

King Stephen sent Hilary to attend a church council at Reims in 1148 along with Robert de Bethune, who was the Bishop of Hereford, and William de Turbeville. Theobald of Bec was also present, even though the king had forbidden him to attend. The medieval chronicler Gervase of Canterbury stated that Stephen wanted to weaken Theobald's standing with the papacy, but Stephen also would have wished to assert his authority over the English Church by insisting on the right to limit papal contact with the English bishops, something that his predecessors had always done.

Hilary attempted to excuse the king's attempt to exclude Theobald from the council, which appears to be the main reason why Stephen allowed Hilary to attend. Hilary was rewarded for his loyalty by being named a queen's chaplain. Soon after the council, Robert de Bethune died and Gilbert Foliot was elected to the see of Hereford, at the direction of the pope. Theobald was in exile in Flanders because he had defied the king, so the pope ordered Robert de Sigello, the Bishop of London, Josceline de Bohon, the Bishop of Salisbury, and Hilary, to go to Flanders to help Theobald consecrate Gilbert. However, the three bishops were reluctant and told the pope that because Gilbert had not received the royal assent, nor had he sworn fealty to Stephen, they would not consecrate him. Theobald then consecrated Gilbert with the help of some continental bishops. Hilary was one of the bishops who made peace between Theobald and Stephen after the council at Reims, helping in the negotiations after Theobald's return to England. Theobald settled at Hugh Bigod's castle of Framlingham; negotiations between the royal party and the archbishop's party resulted in the king yielding and in the restoration of the archbishop to his lands.

== Struggle with Battle Abbey ==
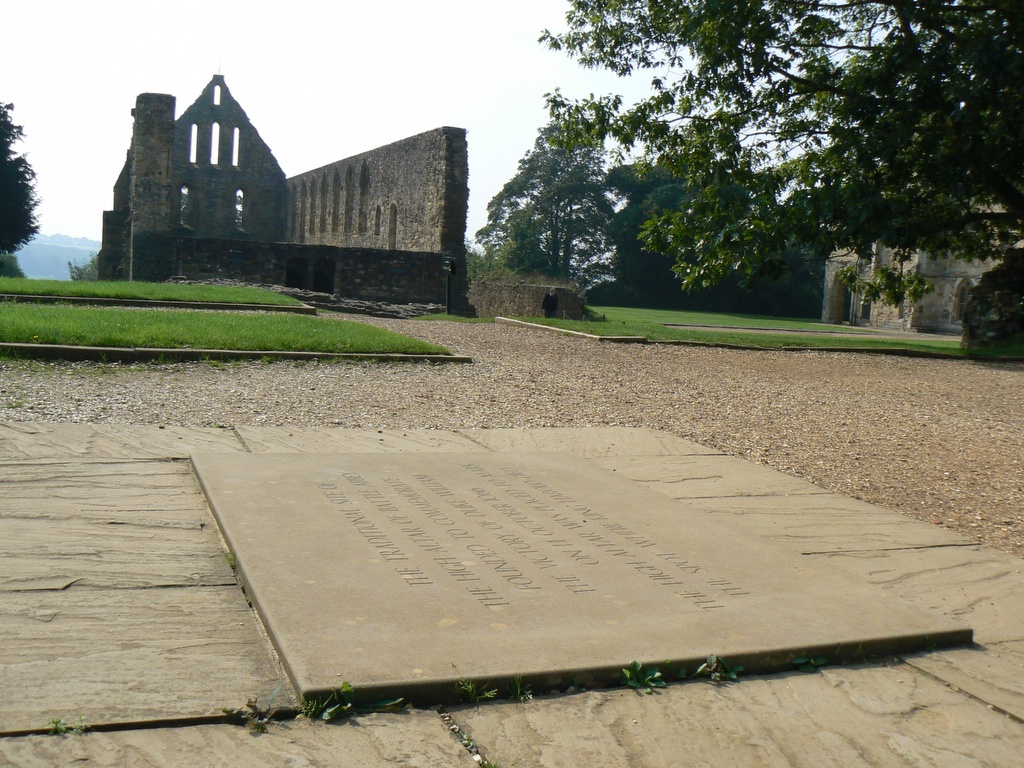
The ruins of Battle Abbey

Hilary struggled with the abbot of Battle Abbey for many years over the exemption claimed by the abbey from the oversight of the Bishop of Chichester, in whose diocese it was located. The abbey had never received a papal exemption but relied instead on its royal foundation by William I of England, and its status as an eigenkirche, or proprietary church of the king. Under Stephen, the abbey's claims prevailed, but after Stephen's death, Hilary excommunicated the abbot, who appealed to the papacy. The appeal backfired when Hilary obtained from both Pope Eugene III and Adrian IV orders for the abbot to obey the bishop. In 1157, the then Abbot of Battle, Walter de Lucy, brother of Richard de Luci, the Chief Justiciar, took the case before Henry II, at a council held at Colchester.

At the council, Walter de Lucy produced William I's foundation charter and the confirmation by Henry I of England, Henry II's grandfather. Both documents were admitted as genuine, and as freeing the abbey from ecclesiastical oversight, as Henry II had at his coronation confirmed all his grandfather's charters. Modern scholarship has shown, however, that at least one of the documents had been recently forged, shortly before 1155. (Note: The historian Eleanor Searle argues that the charters were forged in three periods, one from shortly after the death of Stephen in 1154 to 1157, another group in the period 1157 to 1174, and lastly a group forged in the first part of the 13th century. One charter at least probably was forged after Hilary's death, for it bears his name as a witness.) Hilary argued that only a papal privilege could exempt a monastery from episcopal oversight and that the abbey had no such privilege. Hilary argued that no king could grant such an exemption unless they had a licence from the papacy. Henry was unimpressed by this argument, for it impinged on his royal prerogative. Thomas Becket, then Henry's chancellor but later to be famous for his dispute with Henry over ecclesiastical privileges, was one of Hilary's chief opponents at this council. Eventually, the case was decided by persuading Hilary to renounce any episcopal claims on the abbey.

Henry II's biographer, the historian W. L. Warren, suggests that Hilary was pressed to bring the case against Battle Abbey by his cathedral chapter and that Hilary did not pursue the case vigorously. The historian Henry Mayr-Harting sees the case against the abbey as the lone exception in Hilary's long career of support for the royal position against the papacy, and argues that the only reason Hilary opposed the king in this respect was that it was Hilary's own rights as a diocesan bishop that were being flouted. Mayr-Harting also suggests that Theobald of Bec was supporting Hilary's efforts to assert Chichester's rights.

The historian Nicholas Vincent argues that the entire basis of this account, which ultimately rests on the Chronicle of Battle Abbey, is part of the forgeries produced by the Battle monks. He argues that the only documentary evidence detailing the course of the legal battle besides the Chronicle is a forged charter of Henry II to the abbey and a letter of Theobald's that itself may be forged, as it repeats the story of the Chronicle almost word for word. Vincent's point is that although there was no doubt a dispute between Hilary and the abbey over a claimed exemption, as evidenced by a 1170 letter of Becket's referring to some sort of settlement between the monks and the bishop, the actual account in the Chronicle is untrustworthy. Unfortunately, the 1170 letter does not give any details of the dispute, merely stating that the bishop was "forced to make public peace with the abbot".

== Henry II's reign ==
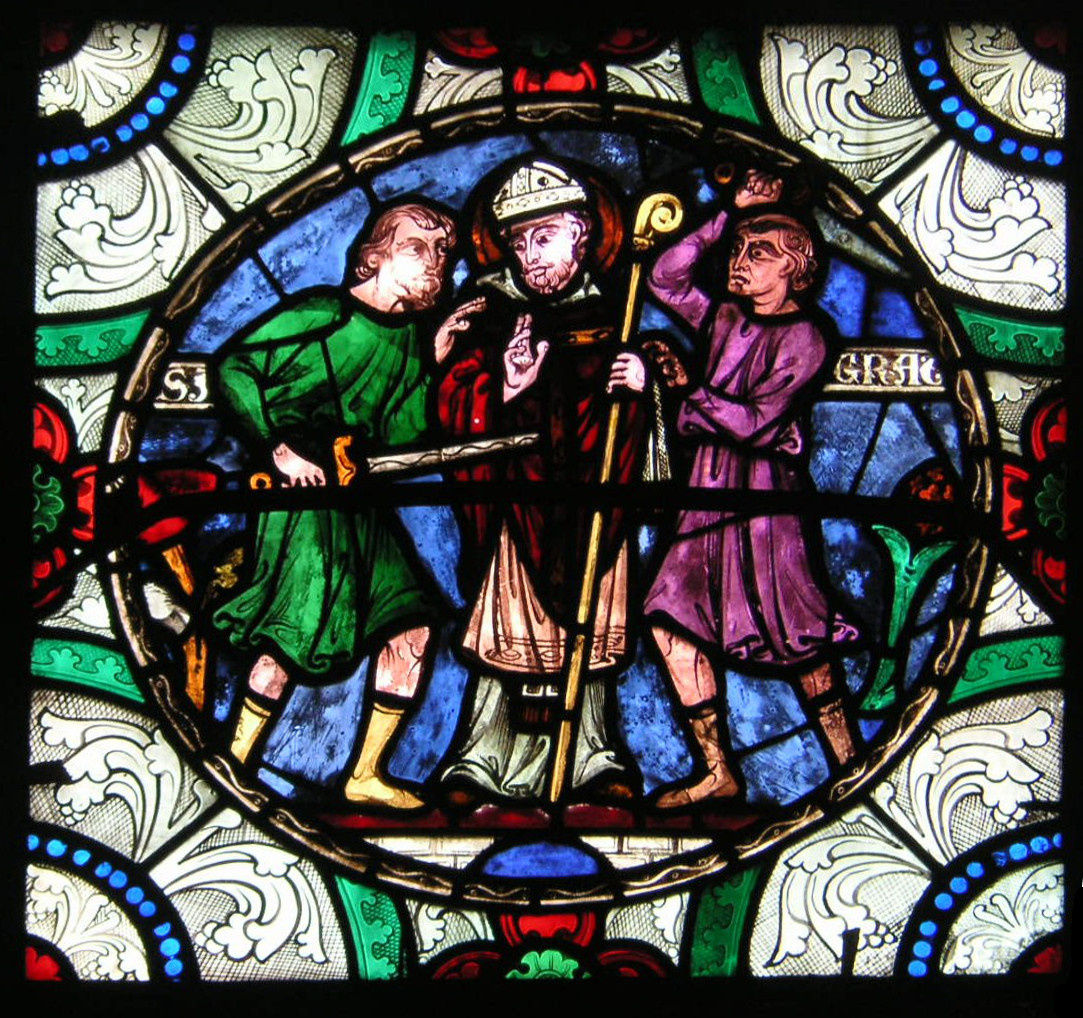
The martyrdom of Thomas Becket, from a stained glass window in Canterbury Cathedral. Hilary was an opponent of Becket's.

Hilary held the office of Sheriff of Sussex in 1155, and then again in 1160 through 1162. It was unusual for a bishop to hold the post of sheriff, and was a measure of the trust that King Henry II had in Hilary. Hilary was the only bishop to hold the office of sheriff during Henry's reign, with the possible exception of Robert de Chesney, the Bishop of Lincoln. An English church council in 1143 had forbidden clergy to hold office as stewards or tax gatherers for non-clergy. As the office of sheriff involved the gathering of the county farm, or income from the county, and the payment of those revenues into the Exchequer, clergy holding office as sheriffs would have been acting against the decrees of the 1143 council. Hilary was well known as a canon lawyer, and was often employed by the papacy as a judge-delegate, hearing cases that had been appealed to Rome, and then sent back to the country of origin for trial. He also assisted other papal judges, including Theobald of Bec. Hilary served in England as a royal justice in 1156, and then was with the king in Normandy from late 1156 to April 1157. Hilary acted as judge-delegate for the papacy in at least 15 cases during his bishopric. He acted as a legal advisor to Henry II on a number of occasions, and Hilary's clerks occasionally drew up documents for the king.

Hilary created the offices of treasurer and chancellor of the diocese of Chichester to regulate and improve the finances of the cathedral chapter and the diocese. He also was involved in the canonisation of Edward the Confessor, writing a letter to Pope Alexander III in favour of Edward's sainthood, and was one of the three bishops who announced the canonisation at Westminster Abbey and celebrated a mass in honour of the new saint. (Note: The other bishops were Robert de Chesney and Nigel, Bishop of Ely.)

In May 1162, Hilary was part of the deputation sent to the monks of Christ Church Priory by Henry II to secure the election of Thomas Becket as the next Archbishop of Canterbury. When Gilbert Foliot, the Bishop of Hereford, objected to Becket's candidacy, Hilary took the position that the king desired the election, so the bishops and electors should elect the king's choice. When it was suggested that a monk should hold Canterbury, as had been the custom previously, Hilary asked if the questioners thought that only one way of life was satisfactory to God.

The next year, a council held at Westminster became one of the early stages in the king's growing quarrel with Becket over criminal clerks. The quarrel was sparked by the problem of clergy who committed crimes; Becket supported the Church's position that all clergy, even those in minor orders, could be tried only in ecclesiastical courts. As perhaps as many as a fifth of the population of England may have been in some form of clerical orders, including the minor ones, allowing this would have diminished the king's authority. In the past, English law had tried clerks who committed serious offences in the royal courts, but recent changes in canon law were changing this practice. At Westminster, Henry tried to get the leading laymen and bishops to swear to uphold the old customs of England, instead of the newer canon law practices. All the bishops swore, with the reservation that the customs were not in conflict with canon law. Hilary, however, added no qualifiers to his oath. Although the oath supported Becket's position, after the council, most of the bishops, including Hilary, were persuaded by the king to support some compromise position and threw their support behind Henry.

After the Council of Westminster, Hilary supported the king throughout the Becket dispute, and one factor in his royalist position may have been that Hilary remembered who had opposed his case against Battle Abbey, and thus refused to support the archbishop. Towards the end of 1163, Henry sent Hilary on an embassy to Becket, to persuade the archbishop to modify his position, but Becket was unmoved. Hilary also took part in the king's embassy in 1164 to Pope Alexander III and King Louis VII of France, which attempted to persuade the pope and the king of France to favour King Henry instead of Becket, and to keep Becket from finding a haven in France during his exile.

== Death and legacy ==
Hilary died in July 1169, probably on 13 July. The historian David Knowles described Hilary as "an extremely quick-witted, efficient, self-confident, voluble, somewhat shallow man, fully acquainted with the new canon law but not prepared to abide by principles to the end. His talents were great, but he used them as an opportunist." In Hilary's favour, he was heavily involved in providing livings for the vicars who resided at the parish churches and performed the actual cure of souls, or pastoral duties, in his diocese. He was also a benefactor of libraries, and worked hard to recover lands once belonging to his church but lost in the years of Stephen's reign. He also promoted clerical reform in his diocese, working to change many of the churches that had chapters of secular clergy into churches with chapters of Augustinian canons. Hilary secured the consent of his cathedral chapter for any grants of lands, even those that he had acquired personally. Thirty-five documents survive from his bishopric, but few of them can be attributed to a specific date. One is his profession of obedience to the Archbishop of Canterbury, and the others are a mix of charters, judgements made by Hilary, and confirmations of rights and privileges.

Hilary's clerks were trained in administration, and one of them, his nephew Jocelin, was named chancellor of Chichester Cathedral by his uncle. Jocelin later became Archdeacon of Lewes and a royal judge. A number of Hilary's clerks served with Thomas Becket for a time, most of them after leaving Hilary's service.

== Citations ==
Catholic Church titles
Preceded by William of York	Archbishop of York-elect; Election quashed 1147	Succeeded by Henry Murdac
Preceded by Seffrid I	Bishop of Chichester; 1147–1169	Succeeded by John of Greenford
