= Robert of Melun =

12th-century English theologian and Bishop of Hereford

- Bishop of Hereford
- Appointed: 1163
- Term ended: 27 February 1167
- Predecessor: Gilbert Foliot
- Successor: Robert Foliot

Orders
- Consecration: 22 December 1163 by Thomas Becket, Archbishop of Canterbury

Personal details
- Born: c. 1100
- Died: 27 February 1167
- Buried: Hereford Cathedral

Robert of Melun (c. 1100 – 27 February 1167) was an English scholastic Christian theologian who taught in France, and later became Bishop of Hereford in England. He studied under Peter Abelard in Paris before teaching there and at Melun, which gave him his surname. His students included John of Salisbury, Roger of Worcester, William of Tyre, and possibly Thomas Becket. Robert was involved in the Council of Reims in 1148, which condemned the teachings of Gilbert de la Porrée. Three of his theological works survive, and show him to have been strictly orthodox.

Robert returned to England in 1160 and was appointed Bishop of Hereford in 1163. King Henry II of England appointed him to the see, or bishopric, and was influenced in his decision by Pope Alexander III and Thomas Becket. Following his consecration, Robert became involved in the dispute between Becket and the king, during which he generally took the king's side. He also served as a papal and a royal judge.

== Early life ==
Robert was born in England, probably in about 1100. Nothing else is known of his background. He owed his name to the place where he taught, Melun in France. Robert studied under Peter Abelard and Hugh of St. Victor in Paris, where in 1137 he succeeded Abelard as a teacher in the school on Montagne Ste-Geneviève. John of Salisbury and William of Tyre were among his pupils in Paris. King Henry II of England's cousin, Roger of Worcester, later the Bishop of Worcester, was another of Robert's students. He probably also taught Thomas Becket, later Archbishop of Canterbury, although this is not certain.

Robert went to Melun in 1142 to direct a school, but returned to Paris in 1147. He took part in the condemnation of Gilbert de la Porrée at the Council of Reims in 1148, working with Peter Lombard to secure Porrée's recantation. A small consistory court was held after the ending of the council's deliberations, and was attended by Bernard of Clairvaux and Suger of St Denis, along with Robert and Peter. This court forced Porrée to repudiate his views on the Trinity. A fellow scholar, Herbert of Bosham, described Robert as a great teacher, who "sent forth from himself, like rays of his light, a great and learned host of students".

== Appointment to Hereford ==
After teaching as a master of arts in Paris for over forty years, Robert was recalled to England by King Henry II in 1160, and was appointed Bishop of Hereford in 1163. He was consecrated at Canterbury on 22 December by Archbishop Thomas Becket. (Note: Some authors give a consecration date of 24 December, and a few medieval sources say he was consecrated sometime in 1164.) Becket was prominent among those recommending Robert for the vacancy at Hereford; one of Becket's later biographers said Becket urged the king to find benefices for Englishmen living abroad. There is some evidence Pope Alexander III had a hand in Robert's election, as Becket in 1166 reminded Robert and Roger of Worcester they both owed their episcopates to Alexander.

Little evidence of Robert's activities survives from his time as bishop, although it is known he acted as a papal judge-delegate in 1165. Five documents survive from his time at Hereford, as well as confirmations of gifts by previous bishops to Llanthony Priory, which he augmented with another grant of tithes. He also served as a royal judge.

== Role in the Becket dispute ==
In 1163, a conflict arose between the king and the new Archbishop of Canterbury, Thomas Becket, over the rights of the king in the English church. At a council held at Westminster in October 1163, the king and Becket contended over the question, with the bishops supporting Becket against the king. Robert was involved in the conflict not only as a bishop-elect, but as an envoy to Becket from the pope, as he accompanied Philip of Aumone, a French abbot, who was sent by Alexander to Becket after the Council of Westminster to urge Becket not to inflame the situation. Robert went with Philip, probably because it was hoped he would be able to influence Becket.

Robert was present in January 1164 when the king summoned a council of the barons and the bishops to Clarendon, where the king demanded both groups swear to uphold the royal rights of Henry's grandfather, King Henry I, without any reservations or conditions. Although Becket at first attempted to resist, he eventually submitted, and then forced the other bishops to swear also. In October 1164, Becket was accused of denying justice to a royal vassal, tried at a council held at Northampton, and was found guilty although he did not accept the sentence. During the trial, Robert attempted to moderate Becket's behaviour by persuading him not to have his archiepiscopal cross, a symbol of spiritual authority, carried in front of him when he entered the court, which would be an insult to the king. Shortly after the trial, Robert interceded with the king to order that no injury be done to Becket, who went into voluntary exile.

Early in Becket's exile, Robert received a papal censure for not doing more to support Becket. In summer 1165, Robert accompanied Gilbert Foliot, the Bishop of London, on a papal mission to King Henry, to convey to the king Pope Alexander's complaints about the king's behaviour. The king was preventing his subjects from visiting or appealing to the papacy, and Alexander wished to protest against this, and against the king's treatment of Becket. In 1166, Becket tried to convince Robert to switch sides, writing to Robert in conciliatory tones. John of Salisbury, a supporter of Becket's, prevailed upon two French academics to write to Robert, criticising him for hypocrisy.

In October 1166, Becket ordered Robert and Roger of Worcester to attend him in France, so they could give him guidance on his dispute with the king. When they informed the king of their intended journey, he forbade them from leaving England. Nevertheless, they attempted to sneak out of the country in February 1167. They were apprehended on 2 February, and ordered to remain in England not only in the king's name, but also in Alexander's.

== Theology ==
Robert's theology is expressed in his three surviving works, the Quaestiones de divina pagina, Quaestiones de epistolis Pauli, and the unfinished Sententiae. The dating of the works is problematic, but it appears the first two works were composed between 1145 and 1157. The Sententiae was revised twice, probably during the 1150s and the 1160s. His works, especially the Sententiae, cover the entire subject of theology and are strictly orthodox in Christian doctrine.

Robert's Sententiae, or Summa Theologica, was well known in his time, and has been considered a key connection in theology between Robert's own teachers' works and the works of Peter Lombard. Robert is the first commentator on St Paul to say resistance to a tyrant might be vindicated by the Bible. Robert also opined that a king might be excommunicated if royal actions harmed the church. Robert used Gratian's works as sources for his own, citing the Decretum Gratiani. Although he used this work, which dealt with church law, he does not appear to have been considered a lawyer, and his training was that of a theologian. Furthermore, his years as a student predated the establishment of canon law as a distinct discipline in the European schools. Robert's views of the glossators, and their main work Glossa Ordinaria was that they had shortened their glosses to such a point that they made them unintelligible. Robert was also known as a logician, and John of Salisbury named him one of the leading disputatores, or a person who used rhetoric and logic to debate in public.

Although Robert condemned Gilbert Porrée in conjunction with Peter Lombard, he did not agree with Lombard's Christology, or views on the nature of Jesus Christ. Likewise, although he disagreed with some of Abelard's teachings, he defended Abelard against charges of heresy. Robert did, however, agree with some of Abelard's teachings and methods. The introduction to the Sententiae proclaims Robert's desire to harmonise the writings of two unnamed scholars, who have been identified by modern writers as Hugh of St Victor and Abelard.

== Death and legacy ==
Robert died on 27 February 1167. William fitzStephen, one of Becket's supporters, wrote that Robert died of grief because he was unable to visit Becket in exile. He was buried in Hereford Cathedral. Robert enjoyed a good reputation on the continent for his knowledge and teaching ability, as well as for his personal qualities. Before his appointment to Hereford, John of Salisbury had praised him, but Robert's conduct during the Becket controversy soured John's attitude towards his old teacher.

Robert's works have been published in four volumes, edited by R. M. Martin. His episcopal documents are in Hereford 1079–1234: English Episcopal Acta Number 7, published in 1993.

== Citations ==
Catholic Church titles
Preceded by Gilbert Foliot	Bishop of Hereford; 1163–1167	Succeeded by Robert Foliot
