= Robert Foliot =

12th-century Bishop of Hereford

- Bishop of Hereford
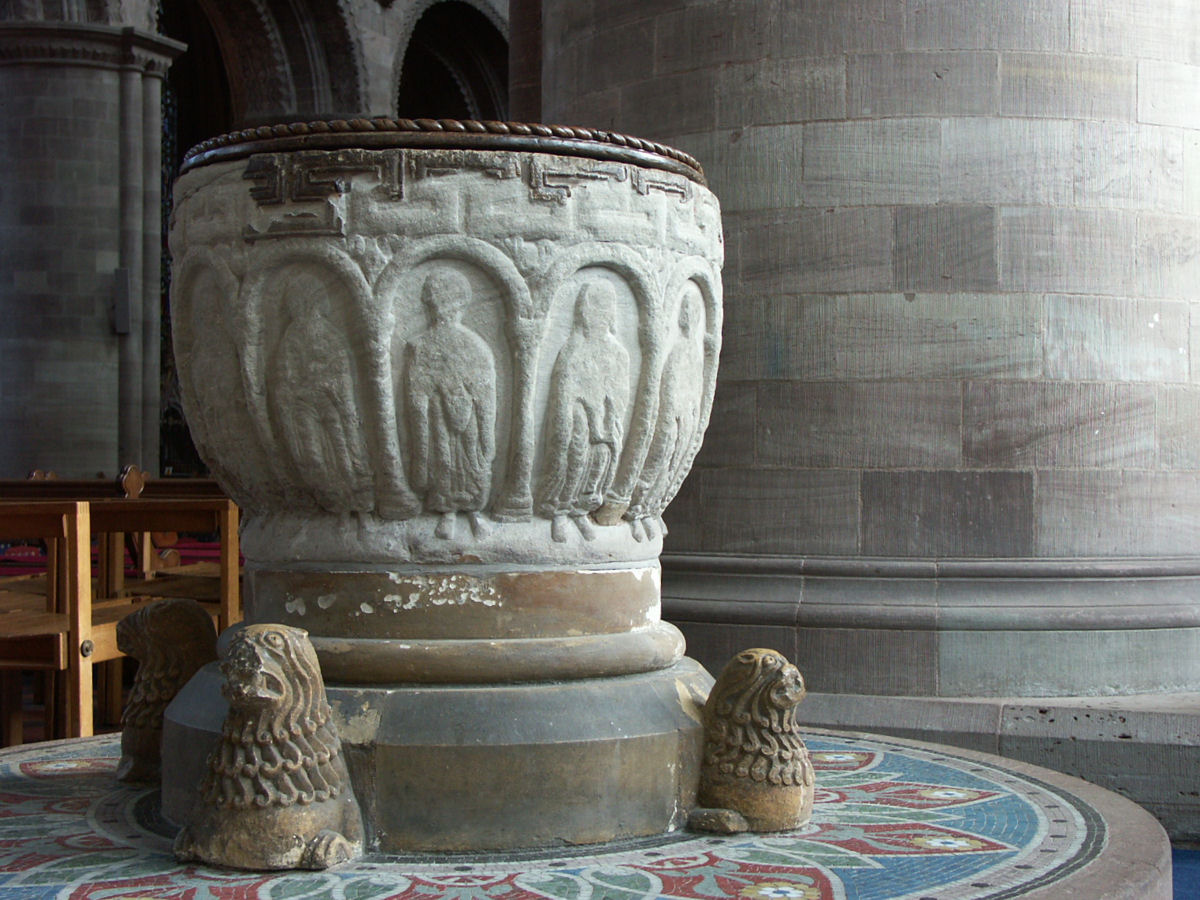
- Norman font from Hereford Cathedral, which predates Foliot's term in office.
- Elected: April 1173
- Term ended: 9 May 1186
- Predecessor: Robert of Melun
- Successor: William de Vere
- Other post: Archdeacon of Oxford

Orders
- Consecration: 6 October 1174 by Richard of Dover, Archbishop of Canterbury

Personal details
- Died: 9 May 1186
- Buried: Hereford Cathedral

Robert Foliot (died 1186) was a medieval Bishop of Hereford in England. He was a relative of a number of English ecclesiastics, including Gilbert Foliot, one of his predecessors at Hereford. After serving Alexander, Bishop of Lincoln as a clerk, he became a clerk of Henry of Blois, the Bishop of Winchester and brother of King Stephen of England. He attended the Council of Reims in 1148, where another relative, Robert de Chesney, was elected as Bishop of Hereford. Chesney then secured the office of Archdeacon of Oxford for Foliot.

During the early 1160s, Foliot also served as a clerk for Thomas Becket, the Archbishop of Canterbury, but left the archbishop's service as Becket's dispute with the king began to intensify. He was elected to Hereford in 1173, and served as a royal and papal judge while bishop. Archeological evidence links the building of the Bishop's Palace at Hereford to his episcopate. After his death, Foliot was buried in Hereford Cathedral.

== Early life ==
Robert Foliot was a relative of both Gilbert Foliot, Bishop of Hereford and Bishop of London, and of Robert de Chesney, Bishop of Lincoln. Another relative was Ralph Foliot, a royal justice. (Note: Some sources name him the nephew of Gilbert, but others are unsure of the exact relationship.) Robert Foliot's family appears to have been the branch of the Foliot family that owned the manor of Warpsgrove in Oxfordshire. This is made likely by Foliot's confirmation of a gift of land from Ralph Foliot of Warpsgrove to Ralph's son, and it is possible that Foliot was the brother or uncle of Ralph Foliot.

There is no evidence of Foliot's education, but he likely received an education to fit him for his career in the church. Bibliographers have frequently confused him with his predecessor as bishop, Robert of Melun, so he has mistakenly been given as the author of a number of documents.

== Clerical career ==
Foliot was a canon of Lincoln Cathedral by 1147, and an official of Alexander of Lincoln, the Bishop of Lincoln, who secured Foliot's early promotions in the church. Foliot was sent to the Council of Reims in 1148 by the Lincoln cathedral chapter to learn Pope Eugene III's wishes regarding the vacant bishopric, as Alexander had died in February 1148. Henry of Blois, the Bishop of Winchester, was attempting to secure Lincoln for one of his nephews, but the pope agreed with the chapter and appointed Robert de Chesney as bishop instead. After his consecration, Chesney continued to employ Foliot as a clerk.

Foliot was later named Archdeacon of Oxford in the Lincoln diocese, sometime before 1 October 1151, owing the appointment to Chesney. He was also a canon of Hereford Cathedral, appearing in that capacity in 1173, but it is unclear when exactly he acquired the position. It is also unclear whether he owed this position to his relative Gilbert Foliot, who was bishop of Hereford from 1148 to 1163, or if he received the canonry after 1163 through royal influence. Foliot served as a clerk for Thomas Becket, the Archbishop of Canterbury, witnessing three documents for Becket during the period 1162–1164.

During early days of Becket's dispute with the king, Foliot helped mediate between Becket and Gilbert Foliot, who was supporting the king. Robert Foliot was one of the first of Becket's clerks to leave the archbishop's service, asking permission to leave Becket's household shortly after the council at Clarendon in January 1164, which ratified the Constitutions of Clarendon.

== Bishop of Hereford ==
Foliot was elected to the see of Hereford in late April 1173 and consecrated on 6 October 1174 at Canterbury by Archbishop Richard of Dover. Hereford had been vacant since the death of Robert of Melun in 1167, due to Becket's exile and then death. Foliot was either elected by the cathedral chapter without guidance from the king, or was nominated to the cathedral chapter by King Henry at the urging of his relative Gilbert Foliot. Robert Foliot later attended the Third Lateran Council in 1179. While bishop, he became involved in a dispute with Hugh Parvus, a local baron, over the power of appointment to two churches. He also served as a judge-delegate for the papacy, serving with Roger, the Bishop of Worcester on cases including one between a Norman monastery and an English priory. He judged a number of other cases for the papacy during his time as bishop. He received over 40 surviving papal commissions and communications, some of which dealt with the problems of married clergy in his diocese. From his ecclesiastical documents, almost 40 survive.

While bishop Foliot gave books, altar furnishings, and land to his cathedral chapter, as well as a purple and gold cape to Wigmore Abbey. Although no documentary evidence links him to the timbered hall in the bishop's palace at Hereford, tree-ring dating of the timbers has dated its construction to 1179, during his time as bishop. He also gave money to the Bishop's Chapel in Hereford Cathedral.

== Death and legacy ==
Foliot died on 9 May 1186, and was buried in Hereford Cathedral. Copies of his correspondence survive at the Bodleian Library at Oxford University.

== Citations ==
Catholic Church titles
Preceded by Robert of Melun	Bishop of Hereford; 1173–1186	Succeeded by William de Vere
