= Theobald of Bec =

Archbishop of Canterbury from 1139 to 1161

- Archbishop of Canterbury
- Appointed: 1138
- Term ended: 18 April 1161
- Predecessor: William de Corbeil
- Successor: Thomas Becket
- Other post: Abbot of Bec

Orders
- Consecration: 8 January 1139 by Alberic of Ostia

Personal details
- Born: c. 1090 Normandy
- Died: 18 April 1161 (aged 70–71) Canterbury, Kent, England
- Buried: Canterbury Cathedral

Theobald of Bec (Note: Sometimes known as Tedbald.) (c. 1090 – 18 April 1161) was a Norman archbishop of Canterbury from 1139 to 1161. His exact birth date is unknown. Some time in the late 11th or early 12th century Theobald became a monk at the Abbey of Bec, rising to the position of abbot in 1137. King Stephen of England chose him to be Archbishop of Canterbury in 1138. Canterbury's claim to primacy over the Welsh ecclesiastics was resolved during Theobald's term of office when Pope Eugene III decided in 1148 in Canterbury's favour. Theobald faced challenges to his authority from a subordinate bishop, Henry of Blois, Bishop of Winchester and King Stephen's younger brother, and his relationship with King Stephen was turbulent. On one occasion, Stephen forbade him from attending a papal council, but Theobald defied the king, which resulted in the confiscation of his property and temporary exile. Theobald's relations with his cathedral clergy and the monastic houses in his archdiocese were also difficult.

Serving during the disorders of Stephen's reign, Theobald succeeded in forcing peace on the king by refusing to consecrate Stephen's son and heir, Eustace. After Eustace's death in 1153, Stephen recognised his rival Henry of Anjou as his heir, and later, Theobald was named regent of the kingdom after Stephen's death. After a long illness, Theobald died in 1161, following which unsuccessful efforts were made to have him canonised as a saint.

Theobald was the patron of his successor Thomas Becket, and a number of other future bishops and archbishops served as his clerks. During his time as archbishop, Theobald augmented the rights of his see, or bishopric. Historians of his time and later were divided on his character, and he is often overlooked in the historical record, mainly because of the fame of his successor.

== Early life ==
=== Family and background ===
Theobald's family was from the area around Thierville near Le Bec-Hellouin, in the Risle River valley. The modern historian Frank Barlow speculates that Theobald may have been a distant relative of his successor as archbishop, Thomas Becket, as Becket's family came from the same part of Normandy. The exact date of Theobald's birth is unknown; the only clue to his age is that when he died in 1161 contemporaries considered him an old man, suggesting a birth date of perhaps around 1090 to one modern historian. His father was supposedly a knight, but no contemporary reference gives his name. His brother Walter also became a priest, and later a bishop.

Theobald entered the Abbey of Bec in Normandy as a Benedictine monk in the late 11th or early 12th century, while William was the third abbot. But as William was abbot from 1096 to 1124, that leaves a wide range of possible entry dates. Theobald was the 266th monk admitted under William, out of 346. The historian Avrom Saltman suggests that, if admissions were spaced regularly throughout William's abbacy, Theobald would have become a monk in about 1117, but qualifies his estimate with the statement that 1117 "seems to be rather late".

=== Life at Bec ===
In 1127, Theobald was made prior of Bec, after Boso succeeded William as abbot. Theobald became abbot in 1137, following Boso's death in June 1136. The monks of Bec unanimously elected him to be their new abbot without first consulting the Archbishop of Rouen, Hugh de Boves, who consequently threatened to void the result. Audoen, the Bishop of Evreux, and brother of Thurstan, the Archbishop of York, intervened with Hugh and persuaded him to ratify the election. Another problem then arose when Hugh demanded a written profession of obedience from Theobald, which Theobald refused to provide; no previous abbot had made such a profession. Theobald resisted for 14 months before a compromise was reached through the intercession of Peter the Venerable, Abbot of Cluny, allowing Theobald to give a verbal profession to Hugh.

No documents survive from Theobald's tenure as abbot, nor is there any information on the administration of the monastery during his period of office, except that 47 monks were admitted to Bec while he was abbot. Theobald travelled to England on business for his abbey at least once during his abbacy to supervise the monastery's lands there, a trip that took place shortly before his selection as the new Archbishop of Canterbury in 1138.

=== Appointment to Canterbury ===
In 1138, King Stephen chose Theobald to fill the vacant archbishopric of Canterbury over Stephen's own brother, Henry, the Bishop of Winchester, who had helped Stephen gain the throne of England. Stephen feared that Henry would be too powerful as archbishop and would attempt to control the king. The election took place on 24 December; Stephen was present with the papal legate, Alberic of Ostia, and a small group of barons and bishops, but Henry was absent, overseeing the ordination of deacons. Most historians consider that Stephen arranged the election's timing to ensure Henry's absence. Henry believed that Theobald had been elected not only because of Stephen's concerns but also because Waleran of Meulan, the lay patron of Bec, was attempting to put his own man in one of the most powerful positions in England. Waleran and his twin brother Robert, Earl of Leicester were Henry's chief rivals for Stephen's favour, and Henry disliked both of them intensely. Although Theobald was pious and well-educated, he had only become abbot the year before, and his election was probably influenced by the reputation of his monastery, which had already produced two archbishops of Canterbury, Lanfranc and Anselm. Theobald had no important family connections to advance his career, and few clerical allies.

== Archbishop ==
=== Early years ===
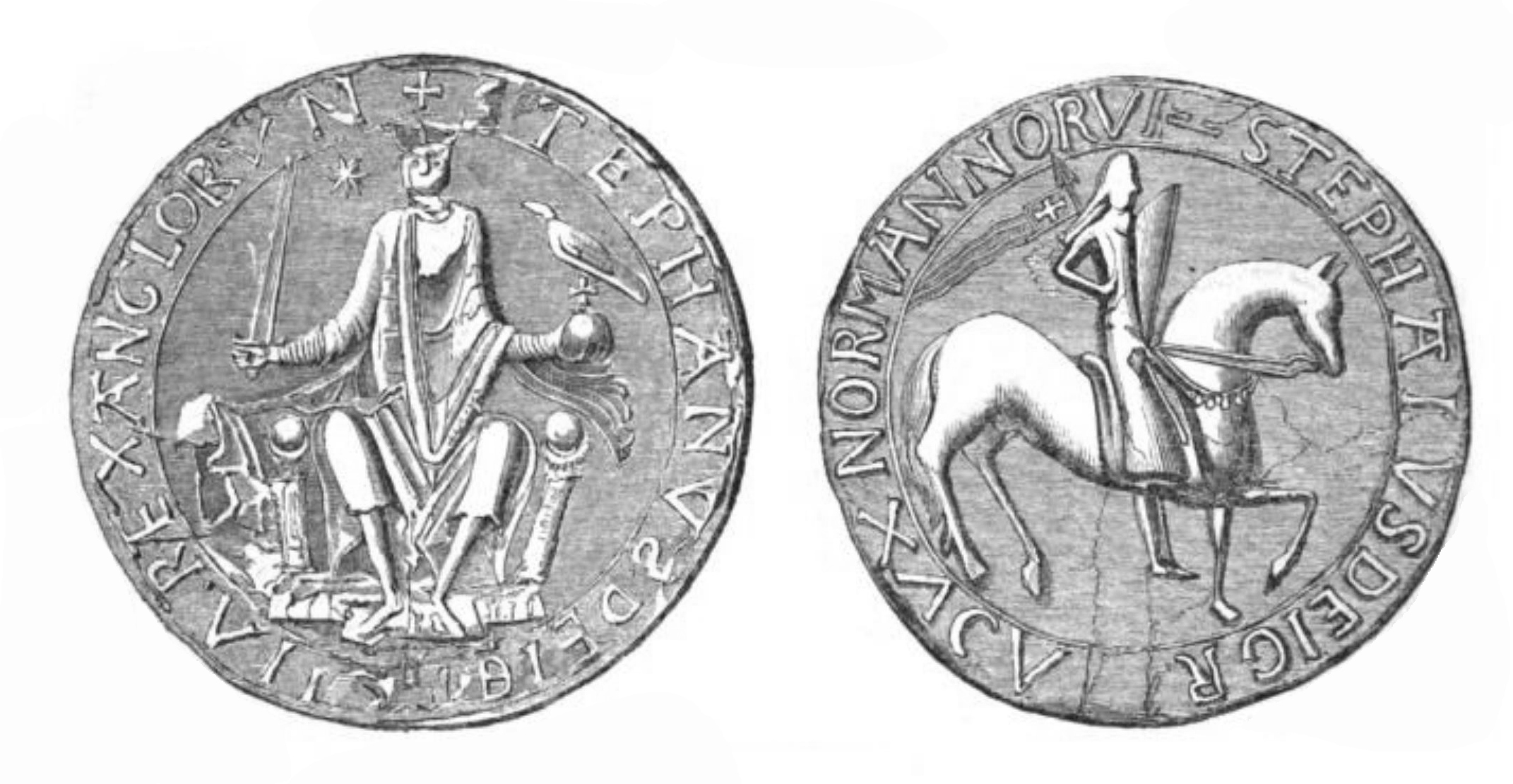
Both sides of the seal of Stephen, from an engraving made in 1846

Theobald was consecrated on 8 January 1139 by the legate, Alberic of Ostia. He went to Rome for his pallium and took part in the Second Lateran Council. As archbishop his behaviour was less political in comparison to that of his main rival, Henry of Blois. Henry was appointed a papal legate on 1 March 1139, which meant that Henry could now call church councils in England and had power equal to or exceeding that of Theobald. Theobald swore fealty to Stephen upon his election to Canterbury, recognising Stephen as the king of England.

Soon after his election Theobald selected his brother Walter to be archdeacon of Canterbury, and in 1148 promoted him to be Bishop of Rochester. Theobald attended the council held by Stephen in June 1139 that deprived Roger of Salisbury, Bishop of Salisbury, and his nephews Nigel, Bishop of Ely, and Alexander, Bishop of Lincoln, of their castles. According to most historians, Theobald took little part in the controversy that followed the council, which eventually ended with Roger's death in 1139 and Nigel and Alexander's restoration to favour. Recently, however, that view has been challenged by two historians who argue that Theobald took a more active role in the council. They base their view on a Vita, or Life of the 12th-century mystic Christina of Markyate, which narrates the events and gives a more central role to Theobald, instead of Henry of Blois, in challenging Stephen's arrest of the three bishops.

=== Civil war ===
Theobald's actions in the next few years are intertwined with the history of Stephen's ascension to the throne. Following King Henry I's death in 1135 the succession was disputed between the king's nephews—Stephen and his elder brother, Theobald II, Count of Champagne—and Henry's surviving legitimate child Matilda, usually known as the Empress Matilda because of her first marriage to the German Emperor, Henry V. King Henry's only legitimate son, William, had died in 1120. After Matilda was widowed in 1125, she returned to her father, who married her to Geoffrey, Count of Anjou. All the magnates of England and Normandy were required to declare fealty to Matilda as Henry's heir, but when Henry I died, Stephen rushed to England and had himself crowned before either Theobald II or Matilda could react. The Norman barons accepted Stephen as Duke of Normandy, and Theobald II contented himself with his possessions in France. But Matilda was not resigned to the loss, and secured the support of the Scottish king, David, her maternal uncle, and in 1138 the support of her half-brother, Robert, Earl of Gloucester, an illegitimate son of Henry I. (Note: Henry I had more than 20 illegitimate children.)

After the Battle of Lincoln in 1141, with Stephen in captivity in Bristol, Theobald did not immediately join the Empress. He claimed that he needed to talk to Stephen before switching his oath of fealty. After consulting in person with Stephen, he secured permission to accept the current conditions and then joined Henry of Blois, who had switched sides, at Winchester in April for a legatine council held to depose Stephen and crown Matilda as queen. Attendance at the council was sparse, however, and the Empress could not be crowned because she did not hold London. After the unsuccessful attempt to crown Matilda, those gathered at Winchester had to flee before Stephen's forces; one of Matilda's chief supporters, her half-brother Robert of Gloucester, was captured. During their flight, Theobald and his fellow bishops were robbed of their horses and ecclesiastical vestments. Theobald then took a leading part in the negotiations that led to the exchange of Robert for Stephen, which happened in November 1141. Henry of Blois, having switched sides again, then held another legatine council in Westminster, which reaffirmed Stephen as king. Theobald ceremonially crowned Stephen at Canterbury during the Christmas court held there.

Matilda remained in England until 1148. The disorders were at their peak between 1142 and 1148, but her cause could never secure enough support to enable her to be crowned. Nor could Stephen decisively defeat Matilda's forces, which meant that England remained divided in allegiance between the two rivals. But while Matilda was in England, her husband Geoffrey was conquering Normandy, which he finally overran in 1144.

=== Difficulties with Henry of Blois ===
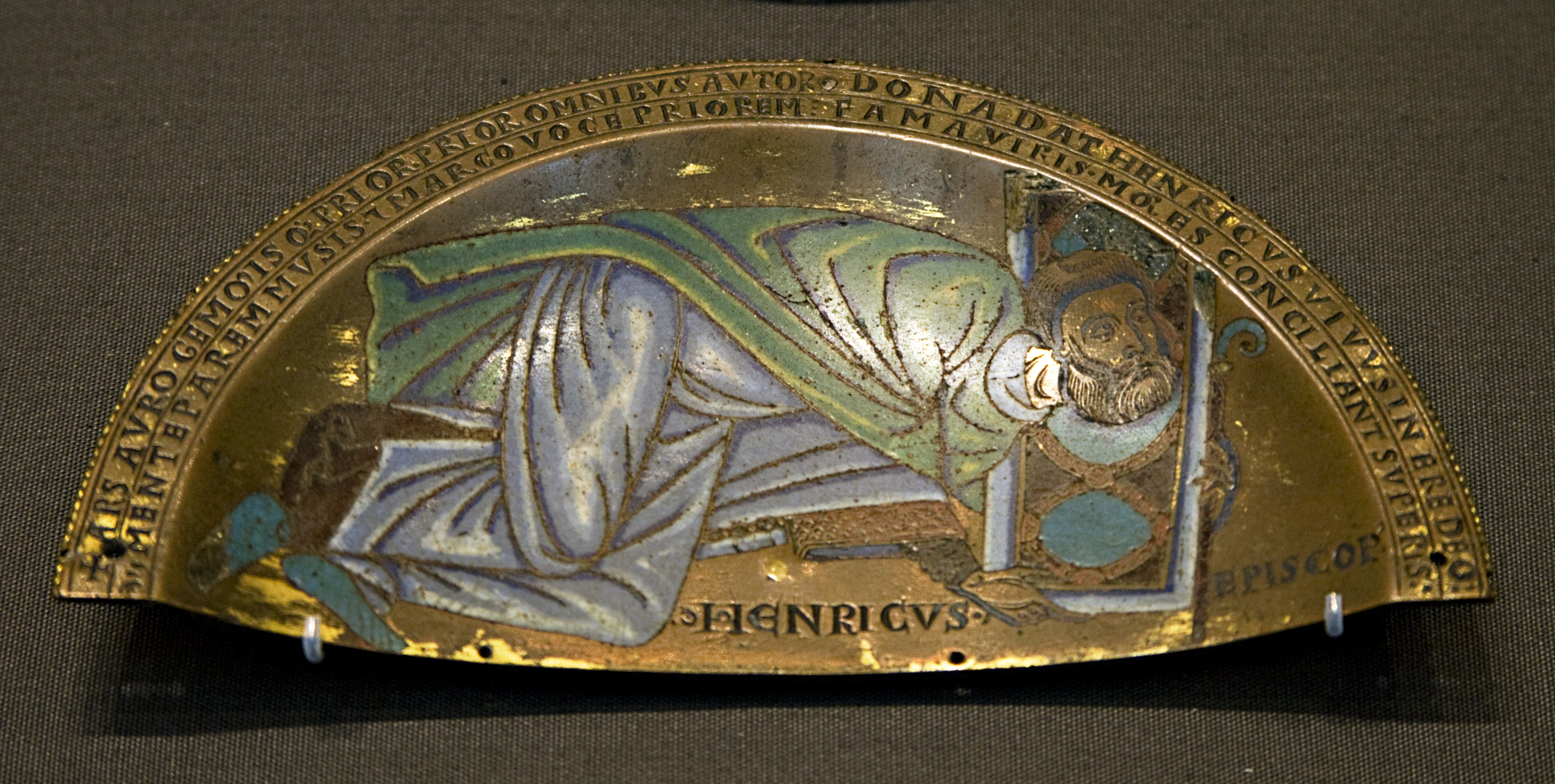
A medieval plaque depicting Henry of Blois, dating from around 1150

Theobald's dealings with Henry of Blois, the Bishop of Winchester, his suffragan bishop, were strained because of Henry's position as papal legate. Henry supported the appointment of William FitzHerbert as Archbishop of York in 1141, which Theobald opposed. Although Theobald spoke out against the manner of election, he took little active part in the subsequent electoral disputes, which resulted eventually in the deposition of FitzHerbert and his replacement at York by Henry Murdac. But in September 1143, Henry's legatine powers lapsed when Pope Innocent II, who had made the legatine appointment, died. Celestine II was elected on 26 September 1143, but he was an opponent of Stephen, and thus was not favourably inclined towards Stephen's brother Henry either. To secure an appointment as legate, Theobald travelled to Rome in December 1143, arriving shortly before Celestine's death on 8 March 1144. Theobald was probably accompanied by Nigel, Bishop of Ely, and Roger de Clinton, Bishop of Coventry. Before his death, Celestine forbade Theobald "to allow any change to be made in the position of the English crown, since the transfer of it had been justly denounced, and the matter was still under dispute". This became the papal policy, and was a significant change from the recognition of Stephen as king by Pope Innocent II soon after Stephen's coronation in 1135. It essentially forbade Theobald from crowning any successor to Stephen, especially while Stephen was still alive.

After Celestine's death, Theobald returned to England, stopping at St Denis Abbey in Paris to help Suger, the abbot, consecrate the newly rebuilt abbey church and its altars. Theobald was the only bishop present at the ceremony whose diocese was not in France. (Note: This abbey was one of the first Gothic churches in Europe, and the consecration served the additional purpose of introducing the higher ecclesiastics of France to the new architectural style.) Meanwhile, Henry of Blois had arrived in Rome and begun negotiations with the new pope, Lucius II, over the elevation of the bishopric of Winchester to an archbishopric. It appears that Lucius appointed a legate, Cardinal Icmar, the Bishop of Tusculum, to travel to England and oversee the project, but Lucius died before anything was accomplished.

=== Disputes with Stephen ===
Theobald was back in Paris in May 1147 to meet with the new pope, Eugene III; among the issues probably discussed was Theobald's dispute with Bernard of St Davids. Relations at this time between Theobald and Stephen seem to have been good, but when Eugene summoned the English bishops to the Council of Rheims in April 1148 the king forbade all of them from attending except for three he nominated: Chichester, Hereford and Norwich. Despite having been specifically refused permission Theobald sneaked away in a fishing boat, presumably accompanied by Gilbert Foliot, who attended the council with him. Theobald had a number of reasons for defying the king: chiefly his obedience to the pope's order commanding his attendance, but also to keep the papacy from favouring the newly elected Archbishop of York, Henry Murdac, in the disputes between York and Canterbury. Murdac was known to be close to his fellow Cistercian Eugene.

Bethune, the Bishop of Hereford, died during the council, and Eugene nominated Foliot as his successor at Theobald's urging. One of the council's last acts was to suspend the non-attending bishops from their offices. The only English bishop specifically named was Henry of Blois, but the others who did not attend were presumably also suspended, although not named. Henry of Blois was singled out for special handling, as the papacy ordered that he could not be reinstated by Theobald; Eugene reserved to himself the power to restore Henry. Theobald appears to have reinstated most of the bishops quickly, as Foliot wrote later in 1148 that only the bishops of Winchester, Durham, Worcester, Bath, and Exeter were still suspended. Theobald forgave the bishops of Exeter, Worcester, and Bath on 11 November 1148, according to the later chronicler Gervase of Canterbury. Gervase also lists Hilary of Chichester as one of those forgiven by Theobald on that date, but as Hilary attended the council, it is likely that this is an error. Durham may have been omitted because he was a suffragan bishop of the Archbishop of York, and his reinstatement was in his archbishop's hands.

The king was angry with Theobald for attending the council, even though the archbishop intervened with Eugene, who was displeased with the king for forbidding the bishops' attendance. Theobald persuaded Eugene against excommunicating Stephen, asking the pope to allow the king to make amends for his behaviour. But Stephen was unimpressed with Theobald's intercession; he confiscated Theobald's property and banished the archbishop. In September 1148, the pope put England under interdict, which was ignored except in Canterbury. At first Theobald was in exile at St Omer, where he consecrated Gilbert Foliot as Bishop of Hereford. He then returned to England and set himself up in Framlingham, which was held by Hugh Bigod, an adherent of the Empress. From there, he conducted the ecclesiastical business of England, but Theobald's presence in the country posed a threat to Stephen's authority, and Stephen quickly settled the differences between the two.

Henry of Blois had lost his legateship before Celestine became pope, but it was not until about 1150 that Theobald was appointed legate by Eugene III, perhaps owing to the exhortations of Bernard of Clairvaux. Theobald held the legatine powers in England until his death in 1161. In 1151 Theobald held a legatine council in London. The council was attended by the king and Eustace, the king's eldest son, as well as other members of the nobility. The council decreed eight canons, or ecclesiastical statutes, including ones condemning the pillaging of church properties and the imposition of financial levies on the clergy. Another canon of the council stated that bishops should no longer pursue violators of church property in the royal courts, but should use ecclesiastical courts instead. The other canons dealt with procedural matters arising from excommunications for abusing church property.

The next year, the archbishop refused to crown Eustace and was again exiled by Stephen, who was attempting to secure the succession for his son by imitating the Capetian dynasty of France, which usually saw the king's heir crowned during his father's lifetime. Although Theobald claimed papal authority for refusal, based on the prohibition by Celestine, it was more probable that he and the bishops had no desire to prolong the civil war. Stephen demanded in April 1152 that Theobald crown Eustace, but the archbishop once again refused, and went into exile in Flanders. Theobald claimed that Stephen had gained the throne through perjury, implying that if the archbishop crowned Eustace, Theobald would be perpetuating this crime. The king and the archbishop reached a truce in August.

In January 1153, Henry of Anjou, Matilda's son, invaded England in pursuit of his claim to the throne, and with the death of Eustace in August 1153, Stephen gave up. Theobald was instrumental in the negotiations between Henry and Stephen that resulted in the Treaty of Wallingford, securing Henry's succession to the throne. Theobald was also present when Henry of Anjou met with Stephen's second son William, probably after Eustace's death, to settle William's lands and status after Henry succeeded Stephen. Pope Eugene III forced Stephen to reverse the sentence of banishment, and Theobald returned to his see. Later it was mainly Theobald and Henry of Blois who negotiated the treaty ending the civil war, as neither Stephen nor Henry of Anjou was interested in a compromise. Henry of Blois and Theobald, who had previously found working together difficult, managed to secure an end to the disorders in England.

=== Under Henry II ===
Theobald was present at Stephen's deathbed in October 1154, and Stephen named him as regent until Henry could take up the crown. During the six weeks before Henry arrived, the archbishop had little difficulty in keeping the peace. After Henry's arrival, Theobald crowned Henry and his wife Eleanor of Aquitaine on 19 December 1154 at Westminster Abbey.

For most of the remainder of Theobald's life, he was occupied with ecclesiastical affairs in his diocese, as well as attending the royal court when Henry was in England. In January 1155, Theobald helped to secure the Chancellorship for his protégé, Thomas Becket, an action that Barlow speculates happened because Theobald hoped to secure more influence with the king through Becket. If this was his hope, Barlow notes that it did not materialise. Although the king and the archbishop occasionally clashed when their interests conflicted, both appear to have wished to minimise the disputes and were willing to compromise to secure good relations. As an example, when Pope Adrian IV died in September 1159, two rival claimants for the papal throne emerged. King Henry, following the custom of his grandfather, Henry I, forbade the bishops from recognising either claimant. Eventually, after Henry weighed the political factors, he recognised Pope Alexander III, and it was only then that Theobald also recognised Alexander as pope.

However, not everything was always harmonious between the king and the archbishop. In 1156, Theobald supported the efforts of Osbert de Bayeux, who was accused of poisoning William, the Archbishop of York, to secure a trial for his alleged crimes in an ecclesiastical court rather than in the royal court. The crime had taken place during Stephen's reign, but Stephen's death had prevented Osbert from being tried in 1154. The delay allowed the shifting of the trial to the church courts, which Henry opposed. Although Theobald's position displeased the king no open rupture ensued. Theobald himself admitted to the papacy in 1154 that English custom was to try clergy for crimes in the secular courts.

Theobald called a church council at London in June 1160, which dealt partly with the issues of the papal schism; his health was poor, and he had to be taken to the council in a litter. A further cause of distress to Theobald was what he saw as the ingratitude of Becket, who did not visit the ailing archbishop.

=== Relations with his cathedral clergy ===
Theobald's cathedral chapter was composed of monks, and he was considered the abbot of the monastery of Christ Church Cathedral. Because of his episcopal duties, the regular running of the cathedral was the responsibility of the prior. At the time of Theobald's election, there were about 140 monks in the chapter, and they seem to have expected that Theobald, being a monk himself, would take their side in disputes and continue to support their needs. Theobald began well, sending a party of monks from the cathedral to St Martin's Priory at Dover, which had been settled with canons instead of monks. Theobald replaced the canons with the monks. Theobald also refounded a collegiate church at South Malling near Lewes to provide benefices for his cathedral chapter.

Theobald worked with his first prior, Jeremiah, to eliminate clerical marriage in the diocese. But Jeremiah had been elected during the vacancy before Theobald's election, and the monks had not secured papal permission for the election of a new prior, so eventually Theobald decided to remove Jeremiah and install his own choice as prior. Jeremiah appealed to the papacy, but Theobald deposed him while the appeal was ongoing and appointed Walter Durdent as prior. Innocent II, however, appointed Henry of Blois to hear the case, and Henry sided with Jeremiah and ordered Jeremiah's reinstatement. Theobald then refused to perform any services in the cathedral until Jeremiah was removed by the chapter. The lack of services would have deprived the monks of income, and Theobald's threat had the desired effect, as Jeremiah resigned his office and left Christ Church for St Augustine's Abbey, Canterbury. Durdent was reinstalled as prior and remained in that position until he became Bishop of Coventry in October 1149.

At Easter, 1151, Theobald took over the management of the chapter's estates, as the new prior, Walter Parvus, was not up to the task. At first, there were no disputes, but soon the monks felt that Theobald was cheating them and imposing too rigorous a definition of poverty, and asked that the stewardship of the estates be restored to Parvus. Theobald refused, and the monks attempted to appeal to the papacy. Their envoys, however, were caught by agents of the archbishop, and the appeal went nowhere. Theobald then deposed Parvus and appointed a new prior. Theobald's relations with the monks after this point seem to have been without incident.

=== Relations with other monastic houses ===
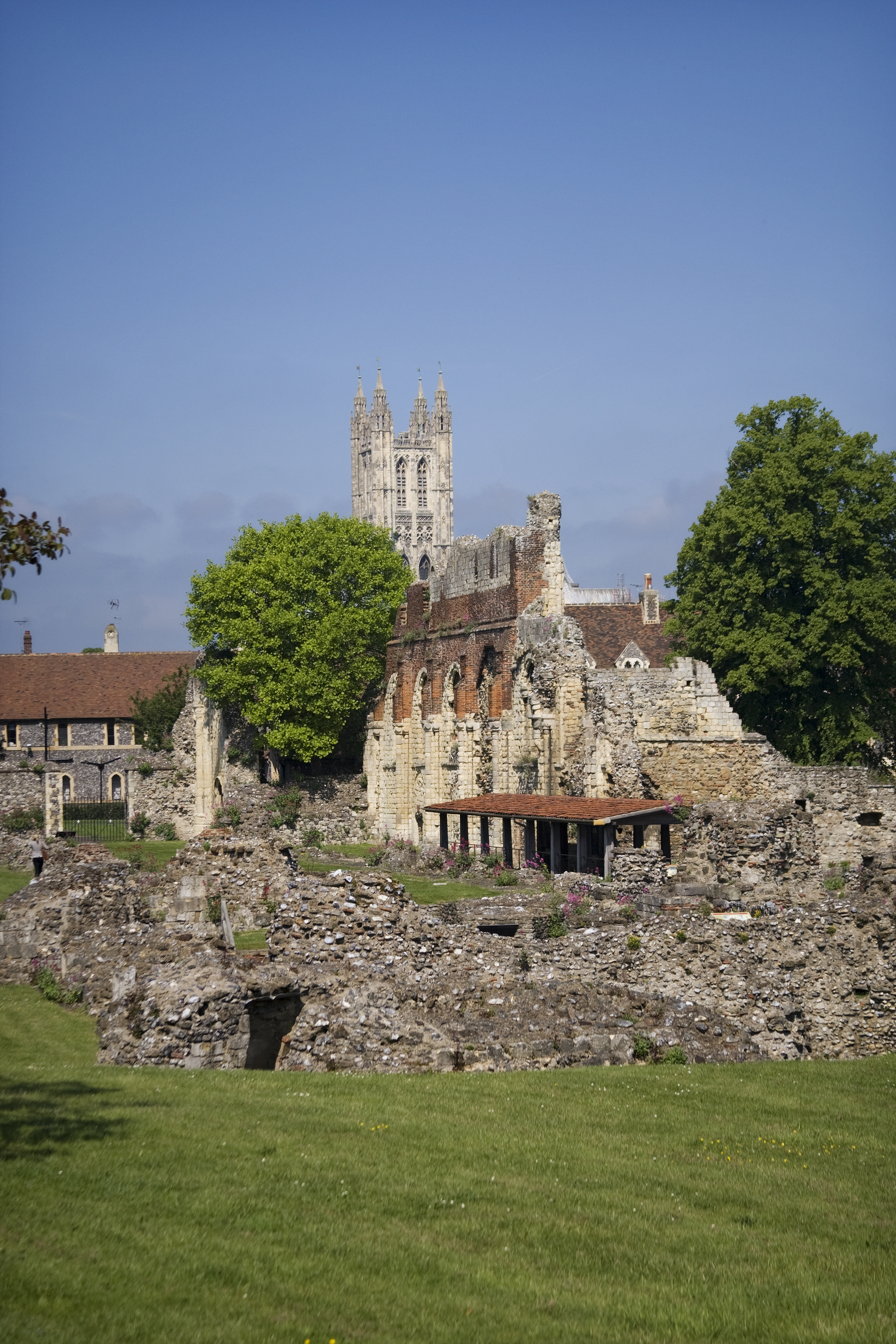
Ruins of St Augustine's Abbey, with Canterbury Cathedral behind

Theobald also had a dispute with St Augustine's Abbey over the right of the archbishop to receive annual payments, and whether those payments were for sacraments performed by the archbishop, which would have been uncanonical, or were for other reasons. The dispute was eventually settled by a compromise in which St Augustine's continued to make the payments but they were specifically stated not to be for sacraments. Another dispute with St Augustine's concerned the right of the archbishops to have a say in the election of new abbots and whether or not the abbots would make a profession of obedience to the archbishops. This was eventually settled by a papal mandate of 1144 instructing the abbots to profess obedience.

The conflict re-surfaced in 1149, when some of the monks of St Augustine's, led by their prior and sacrist, refused to obey the interdict placed on England by Theobald and Pope Eugene III. Theobald had the two officials excommunicated and publicly flogged. When the previous abbot of St Augustine's died in 1151, the prior, Silvester, paid the king for the right to administer the abbey and to hold a free election for a new abbot. The monks then proceeded to elect Silvester as the new abbot, but Theobald refused to confirm the election, accusing Silvester of buying the office. Eventually, however, Pope Eugene III ordered Theobald to allow Silvester to take up the office, which Theobald did in August 1152. Theobald and St Augustine's also came into conflict over the abbey's claims of exemption from the archbishops' oversight, because it owed obedience directly to the pope. Papal documents held at Rome backed the abbey, but there were no English royal charters that gave the abbey its liberty from the archbishops. Theobald attempted to end the confusion by legal actions both at Rome and in England, but the record was mixed. The documents at Rome clearly favoured the abbey, but at a royal council held at Northampton in 1157, Henry II ruled in favour of Theobald. As part of the settlement Silvester, as abbot, was required to make a formal profession of obedience to Theobald, something he had been attempting to avoid since his election. The struggle with Silvester was just one event in the long history of the dispute between Canterbury and St Augustine's.

As well as St Augustine's, the abbots of a number of other monasteries in the diocese of Canterbury are known to have professed obedience to Theobald, as the documents recording the events survive. Not only abbots and priors from within Canterbury, but some from other dioceses swore to obey Theobald, although normally such oaths would have gone to their diocesan bishop instead. Most of these exceptions occurred because the monastic house claimed exemption from the oversight of their diocesan bishop and had a tradition of making those oaths to Canterbury instead. Besides these events, Theobald also intervened in the elections of some abbots, although not always successfully. He attempted to secure the right of Gilbert Foliot to remain Abbot of Gloucester after Foliot's election as Bishop of Hereford, but a new abbot was elected by the monks of Gloucester. Theobald was more successful in securing the election of William, who had previously been a monk at Christ Church, to be Abbot of Evesham over the objections of some of the monks of Evesham.

Theobald also became embroiled in the dispute between Hilary, the Bishop of Chichester, and Walter de Lucy, the abbot of Battle Abbey, over Hilary's claims to jurisdiction over the abbey and the abbey's counter-claims that it was exempt from episcopal supervision. The abbey had never received a papal exemption, but relied instead on its royal foundation by King William I of England and its status as an eigenkirche, or proprietary church of the king. Under King Stephen, the abbey's claims prevailed, but after Stephen's death, Hilary excommunicated the abbot, who appealed to the papacy. Theobald supported the bishop, who eventually secured a trial before King Henry II. It was a minor setback for Theobald when the case was eventually decided in Battle's favour, mainly on the basis of charters that were thought at the time to be genuine, but modern historians have come to believe were forged.

=== Relations with other bishops ===
Theobald was instrumental in securing the subordination of the Welsh bishoprics to Canterbury. His first act in this area was the consecration of Meurig as Bishop of Bangor in 1140, during which Meurig made a profession of obedience like those made by other bishops subject to Canterbury. Bernard, Bishop of St Davids, contested Theobald's right to consecrate Meurig and instead asserted that St Davids should be considered an archbishopric, and that Bernard should receive a pallium. This went against the last half-century of precedent that Canterbury had jurisdiction over the four Welsh sees, a precedent that dated back to Anselm's days when Anselm had consecrated Urban as Bishop of Llandaff in 1107.

Also in 1140, Theobald consecrated Uhtred as Bishop of Llandaff, with Uhtred also swearing to obey Theobald. Likewise, when Theobald consecrated Gilbert as Bishop of St Asaph in 1142, a similar profession of obedience was made. Along with these consecrations, Theobald's legal efforts enabled him to withstand the attempts of Bernard to turn St Davids into an archbishopric, and when Bernard was succeeded by David fitzGerald in 1148, Theobald secured the new bishop's profession of obedience to Canterbury, thus ending the efforts to remove Wales from Canterbury's jurisdiction. Also in 1148, Pope Eugene decided in favour of Canterbury and against the claims of St Davids, securing Canterbury's jurisdiction over Wales.

Theobald even maintained the theoretical claim of Canterbury to jurisdiction over Irish sees by consecrating Patrick as Bishop of Limerick in 1140. That, however, was the last assertion of the claim, as in 1152 the papal legate Giovanni Paparo reorganised the Irish dioceses and settled the issue by appointing the Archbishop of Armagh the primate of Ireland.

Relations with bishops in England remained good, with little activity in the long-running Canterbury–York dispute over the primacy of Britain. Theobald obtained a vague confirmation of his see's primacy from Celestine II in 1143–1144, but at the Council of Reims in 1148 Eugene clarified that this primacy did not affect York's claim to be independent of Canterbury. Because of the unsettled election disputes during the 1140s over the see of York, when it was contested between William of York and Henry Murdac, Theobald faced little challenge from either William or Murdac as to the traditional dispute between Canterbury and York. When William of York died in 1154, Theobald secured York for his protégé, Roger de Pont L'Evêque. Further peace between the two sees was ensured when Theobald consecrated Roger without requiring a profession of obedience, which had previously been a major bone of contention between the two.

=== Patronage and household ===
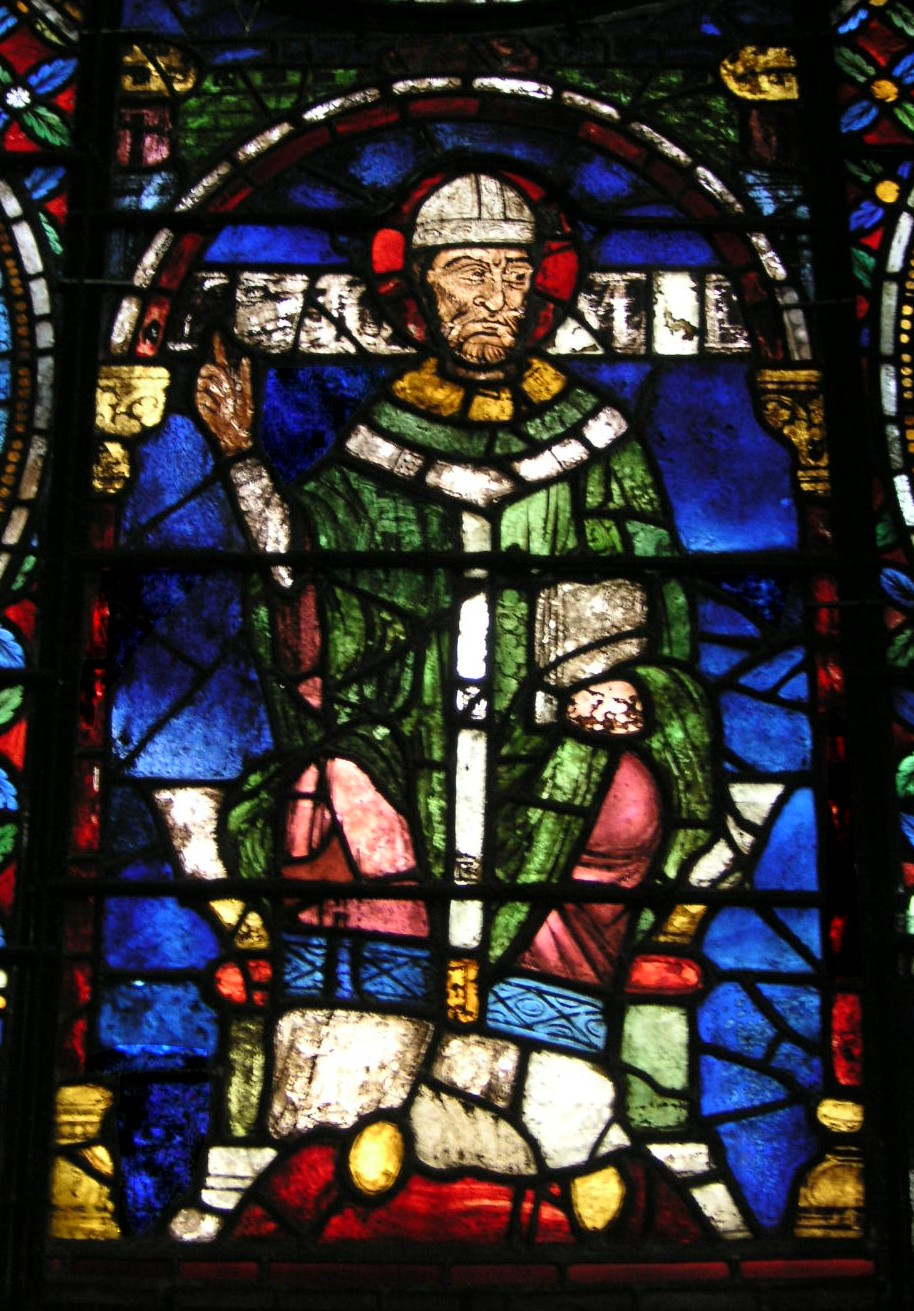
Medieval stained-glass window depicting Thomas Becket

Theobald's household included many young men of ability, including his successor Thomas Becket. Theobald was instrumental in the early spread of Roman law to England, inviting the Bologna-schooled jurist Vacarius to join his administration and advise on legal matters. Whether Vacarius actually started a school in Theobald's household is unclear, but in the 1140s he taught briefly at Oxford. Theobald was instrumental in fostering the teaching of canon law in England; the conflict that later arose between Henry II and Thomas Becket had its roots in disputes that were exposed during Theobald's time in office. While still in Normandy, Theobald had made an intense study of ecclesiastical or canon law, which he continued after being elected archbishop.

Although Theobald was a monk, his episcopal household was not monastic in character. As he settled into the role of archbishop, he seems to have left most of his monastic habits behind, although he continued to have a monk as a companion. His nephews and brother benefited from his nepotism, with his nephews becoming part of his household early in his archiepiscopate. The four nephews—Guillaume, Gilbert, Roger, and Lechard—were witnesses to a charter of Theobald's dated to about 1150 or 1153. After Theobald's death, Guillaume was a clerk in Bartholomew, the Bishop of Exeter's household in around 1172.

Another charter of Theobald's from about 1152 shows the usual household staff that surrounded him. It was witnessed by the archbishop's crossbearer, three of Theobald's nephews, and the clerk who presumably was in charge of them, a chancellor, two chaplains who were monks, a butler, dispenser, chamberlain, steward, cook, usher, porter, and marshal. Theobald also at about the same time granted a mill to his baker named William and some lands to his cook William and the cook's heirs.

Theobald was the patron of three eminent men: Becket, Vacarius, and John of Salisbury. John of Salisbury was secretary to Theobald for many years, and after Theobald's death became Bishop of Chartres. It was during John's time as secretary that he wrote his two most famous works, the Policraticus and the Metalogicon. Others who studied for a time in Theobald's household were Roger de Pont L'Evêque, later Archbishop of York, John Belemis, later Archbishop of Lyon, John de Pageham, later Bishop of Worcester, Bartholomew Iscanus, later Bishop of Exeter, William of Northall, later Bishop of Worcester, and William de Vere, later Bishop of Hereford. In all, his household produced three archbishops and six bishops. The household itself, although not formally a school, acted as one, with many going on to careers in the church.

== Death and legacy ==
Theobald died on 18 April 1161, after a long illness, at his palace in Canterbury. He was buried in Canterbury Cathedral, in the Holy Trinity Chapel, near the tomb of Archbishop Lanfranc. His coffin was opened in 1190 during repairs to the cathedral and his body was found to be uncorrupted, but efforts to secure his canonisation as a saint on the basis of that evidence were unsuccessful. He was reburied in the nave near the altar to St Mary, with his old marble tomb replaced above his new resting place. In 1787 his lead coffin was found in Canterbury.

Although Theobald was troubled by the opposition of his suffragan, Henry of Blois, he regained control of the English Church, secured the rights of his see, and helped maintain the unity of the realm. Contemporaries were somewhat divided on his effectiveness and personality. Gervase of Canterbury felt that he was too impetuous, probably because of Theobald's treatment of his priors at Christ Church. Henry of Huntingdon, who knew him, felt that he was a worthy archbishop. Theobald's legacy perhaps suffered because he was overshadowed by his successor, Becket. Modern historians have been kinder than his contemporaries; Frank Barlow says of Theobald that he was "an upright man, but quick tempered, and sometimes spoke far too rashly".

== Citations ==
Catholic Church titles
Preceded by Boson	Abbot of Bec; 1136–1138	Succeeded by Létard
Preceded by William de Corbeil	Archbishop of Canterbury; 1139–1161	Succeeded by Thomas Becket
