= Robert de Bethune =

12th-century Bishop of Hereford

- Bishop of Hereford
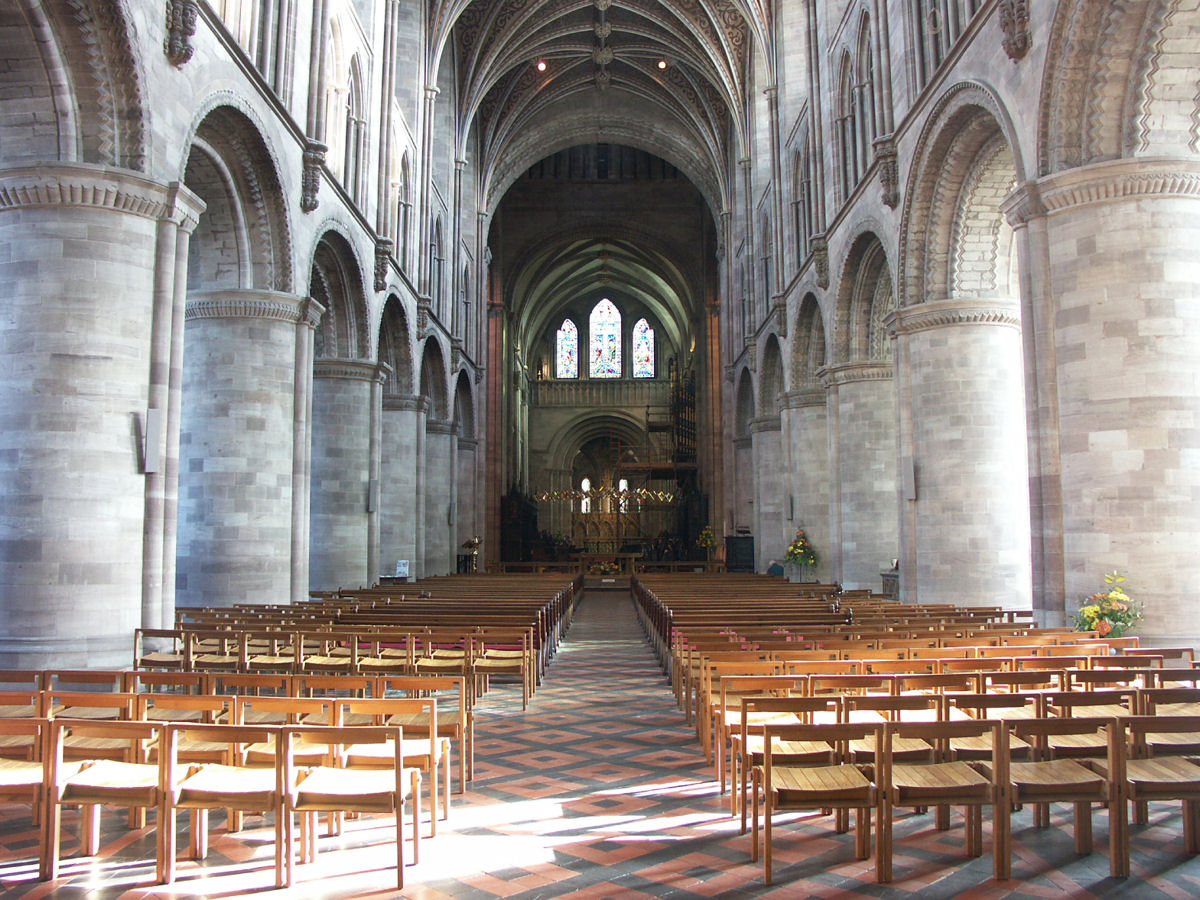
- Interior view of Hereford Cathedral, where Robert de Bethune is buried.
- Appointed: 1130
- Term ended: 16 April 1148
- Predecessor: Richard de Capella
- Successor: Gilbert Foliot
- Other post: Prior of Llanthony

Orders
- Consecration: 28 June 1131

Personal details
- Died: 16 April 1148 Reims
- Buried: Hereford Cathedral

Robert de Bethune (Note: Sometimes known as Robert de Betun, or Robert de Béthune, or Robert of Bethune.) (died 1148) was a medieval bishop of Hereford. From a knightly family, he became a teacher before becoming a canon by 1115. He was elected prior of Llanthony Priory in the middle 1120s, and was named bishop by King Henry I of England in 1130. As bishop, he was often appointed a judge by the papacy and was known for the care he took of his diocese.

After Henry's death in 1135, Bethune first supported King Stephen, who seized the throne from Henry's heiress, the Empress Matilda, but when Matilda's forces captured Stephen, Bethune switched sides to support Matilda. When Matilda did not secure the throne, Bethune once more switched back to supporting Stephen. Construction of Hereford Cathedral was completed under Bethune's episcopate, and consecrated in 1142 and 1148. Stephen appointed Bethune as one of the English bishops that the king allowed to attend the Council of Reims in 1148, and Bethune died there in April 1148. A hagiography is the only surviving evidence of Bethune's cathedral chapter's attempts to promote him as a saint.

== Early life ==
Bethune was the youngest son of a knight, and was at first educated by his eldest brother, who was named Gunfrid and was a schoolmaster. Although the medieval chronicler Robert de Torigni describes Bethune as Flemish, Bethune's medieval biographer, William of Wycombe, says that he and Bethune grew up in neighbouring villages in Buckinghamshire. It thus is likely that Bethune was born near Wingrave, Buckinghamshire, to a family descended from Flemish settlers. He was a schoolmaster in England, teaching elementary subjects, before he went to study theology under William of Champeaux and Anselm of Laon. He was a canon of Llanthony Priory before 1115, and was elected prior of that house in the middle 1120s. Before becoming prior, he was entrusted with establishing a cell of the priory at Weobley, which had been established by Hugh de Lacy shortly before Lacy's death around 1115.

== Bishop of Hereford ==
The see of Hereford had been vacant since 1127, and in 1130, King Henry I of England took the advice of the local magnates and nominated Bethune to the see. Bethune's diocesan bishop as prior, Urban, the Bishop of Llandaff, at first refused permission for Bethune's elevation. However, the archbishop of Canterbury, William of Corbeil, advised that the matter be referred to the papacy. Pope Innocent II ordered that Bethune be allowed to accept the see of Hereford in 1131. He was consecrated on 28 June 1131 at Rochester. In nominating Bethune, the king is said to have felt he needed one "godly bishop" around. Most of Henry's bishops were given their sees as rewards for royal service, and were not particularly noted for piety.

Bethune was known as a strict Augustinian canon, a priest living a monastic life but not a monk. Bethune was often appointed a judge delegate by the papacy to try cases and disputes, which had been referred back to England by the popes. The historian David Knowles said of Bethune that he was a man of wide outlook, with a great desire for reform. He was praised by contemporaries for the care with which he selected men to serve as clergy in his diocese. He also held synods in his diocese, including two during the first year of his episcopate.

== Stephen's reign ==
After the accession of King Stephen of England, Bethune supported Stephen and was often at his court. Stephen had seized the throne at King Henry's death, depriving Henry's surviving legitimate daughter and heiress, Matilda, of the throne. Matilda is usually known as the "Empress" because of her first marriage to the German Emperor Henry V, who died in 1125. Bethune accompanied Thurstan, the Archbishop of York, when Thurstan secured a truce between Stephen and the King of Scots, David shortly after the Battle of the Standard in 1138. When the Empress Matilda landed in England in September 1139 in pursuit of the throne, one of the local magnates of Hereford, Miles of Gloucester supported Matilda, while Bethune continued to support Stephen. Miles' hostility drove Bethune from his diocese, and Miles was in control of Hereford in 1140, leaving Bethune to perform his episcopal duties in Shropshire. During this time, Bethune assisted Theobald of Bec, the new Archbishop of Canterbury, in consecrating Maurice as Bishop of Bangor. Bethune had earlier persuaded the bishop-elect to swear fealty to King Stephen, after Maurice had originally refused. Bethune's standing as a bishop known for his piety and independence of the king helped persuade Maurice that the homage was canonical.

Sometime after Stephen was captured by the Empress' forces in 1141, Bethune switched sides, and he was with the Empress Matilda at Winchester on 4 March 1141, when Matilda claimed the throne of England. He also was present at the council that proclaimed Matilda "lady of the English" shortly thereafter. His diocese of Hereford was in the center of the lands that Matilda controlled, and he was one of the few bishops who was often in Matilda's court. However, Matilda was never crowned, being driven from London before her planned coronation could take place. One of her chief supporters was captured in late 1141, and to secure his release, Matilda released Stephen from captivity, thus prolonging the conflict. Between 1142 and 1148, England was in a state of civil war, with parts of the country supporting Matilda and parts supporting Stephen.

Welsh raids at the beginning of Stephen's reign had driven Bethune's former canons from Llanthony and the bishop gave them refuge at Hereford before establishing them at a new site near Gloucester. The land the canons were settled on had belonged to the diocese, and this led Bethune into conflict with his cathedral chapter, led by their dean, Ralph. Bethune was forced to travel to Pisa to secure an order from Innocent II declaring that the chapter obey their bishop.

Around 1142, Bethune was involved with a conflict with Miles of Gloucester, who was now the Earl of Hereford, which led to the bishop excommunicating Miles and all the inhabitants of the city of Hereford, and "had the doors of the church blocked with thorns and the crosses taken down and placed on the ground". This dispute arose over an attempt by Miles to tax the churches in his earldom, which Bethune regarded as unlawful. Miles died in 1143, which ended the dispute over the taxes. Also, after his death, Bethune was free to leave the Empress' faction and thus returned to supporting Stephen. In 1142, Hereford Cathedral, which had begun under Robert de Losinga around 1079, was finally ready for consecration. The work was finally completed in 1148, and it was once consecrated in that year. The year 1148 also saw the departure of Matilda from England, as her support had dwindled over the previous few years and Stephen was able to secure control of most of England. He was never able to completely remove Matilda's supporters, however.

King Stephen gave permission for some of England's bishops, including Bethune, to attend the Council of Reims in 1148. Stephen had expelled the papal legates, or representatives, who arrived in England to summon the bishops to Reims, and after that appointed three of the bishops as representatives of the English Church. These three, Bethune, Hilary of Chichester, and William de Turbeville, were allowed to attend the council. Theobald of Bec was expressly forbidden to attend, but he managed to evade those watching him and arrived in Reims along with his clerk, Thomas Becket.

== Death and legacy ==
Bethune died on 16 April 1148 at Reims just after the close of the Council of Reims. As his corpse returned to Hereford, miracles were alleged to have taken place along its route. He was buried in Hereford Cathedral.

Bethune's episcopal acta, or his decisions and other documents relating to his episcopal career, have been published in the English Episcopal Acta series, in the volume relating to the diocese of Hereford. A medieval catalogue of works at Llanthony Priory also recorded that they owned a collection of letters by Bethune, but this has not survived.

A Life, or hagiography, giving his life and miracles, was written about him, by one of the Bethune's canons, William of Wycombe. It contains few details of Bethune's life itself. Instead, it is an attempt by his canons to secure sainthood for Bethune. Although the life describes miracles that took place at Bethune's tomb, no evidence survives of a formal cult being developed, and he was never canonised. The historian Avram Saltman called him "the model bishop of his time", because of his care for his diocese and his abilities.

== Citations ==
Catholic Church titles
Preceded by Richard de Capella	Bishop of Hereford; 1131–1148	Succeeded by Gilbert Foliot
