= Meurig (bishop) =

Welsh cleric

Meurig (also known as Maurice) (died 1161) was a Welsh cleric who was Bishop of Bangor from 1139 to 1161.

Meurig continued the rebuilding of Bangor Cathedral.
