= Council of Reims (1148) =

12th-century Roman Catholic Church council at France starting in 1148

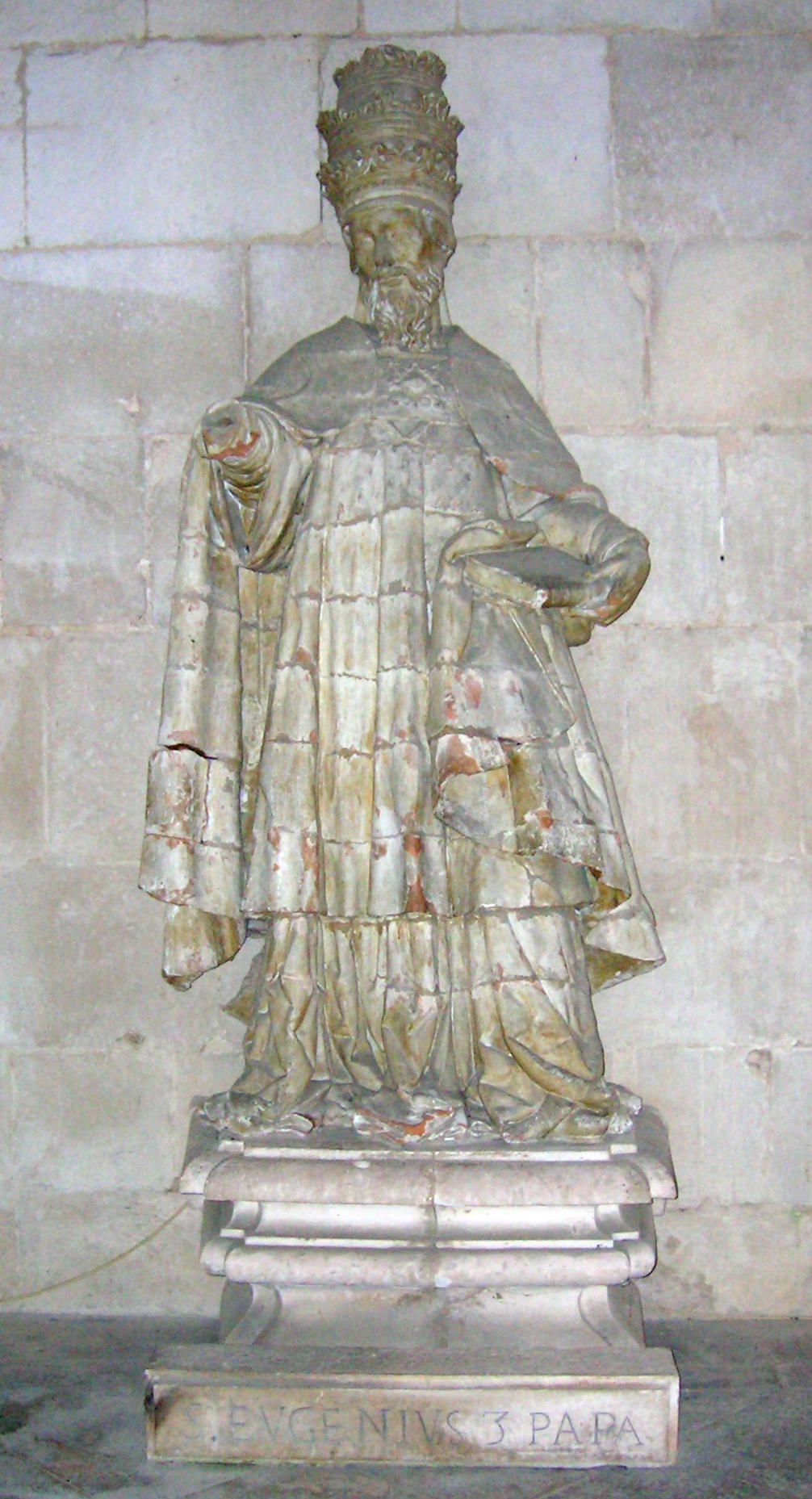
A Portuguese statue of Eugene III, who called the council

In 1148, a synodical council was called by Pope Eugene III to consider a variety of issues for the Church. Originally the summons to the council went out in October 1147 and it was supposed to be held in February 1148 at Trier, but conditions there were such that it was moved to Reims. A number of the bishops and other Churchmen who had been convoked did not attend and Eugene suspended many of the non-attendees, excepting the other Churchmen of Italy, who were excused. The council convened on 21 March 1148 and is said to have lasted 11 days in total, which would give an end date of 1 April 1148. However, it is possible that it was shorter, given that the large increase in the population of Reims would have strained the town's resources.

After the conclusion of the council, Eugene held a consistory trial of Gilbert of Poitiers, the Bishop of Poitiers, who was accused of heretical teachings. In the end, Gilbert was allowed to return to his see.

== Preliminaries and attendees ==
A letter of Eugene's to Suger, Abbot of St Denis, dated 6 October 1147, had already named Trier as the location for the council. It was first convoked on 11 October 1147 by Eugene, who ordered the bishops and other prelates to assemble at Trier on 21 March 1148. This is known from a letter sent by the pope to Henry Zdík, Bishop of Olmuetz. Though a letter sent by the pope on the next day, 12 October 1147, to Eberhard, Archbishop of Salzburg, named Troyes as the location, this is presumably a scribal error.

The papal entourage arrived in Trier on 30 November 1147, but shortly afterwards the pope, moved by complaints from the citizens of Trier, decided to move the proceedings, and announced in February 1148 that the council would move to Reims, but maintaining the date already fixed. A feature of the council was that the pope ordered the attendance of the various bishops and other Churchmen. Although some of those convoked were excused, the reason given was mostly ill health, not any need to deal with their particular office. Those who failed to attend were suspended from office. The Italian bishops, however, were mostly excused from attendance, as Eugene held a council at Cremona in July 1148 where the Reims decrees were announced.

Although the number of Spanish bishops attending is unknown, it is known that among them was Raymond de Sauvetât, Archbishop of Toledo. King Alfonso VII of León and Castile interceded with the pope to lift the sentences against those bishops who did not attend. King Stephen of England refused permission for any of the English bishops to attend, except for the bishops of Hereford, Norwich and Chichester. It was the papal summons which caused the Archbishop of Canterbury, Theobald of Bec, to quarrel with his king, after Stephen refused the archbishop permission to travel to the council. Despite this, Theobald evaded his guards and hired a fishing boat to take him across the English Channel to attend the council.

The precise overall number of bishops, archbishops, and abbots who attended is unknown. Estimates range from 1,100 to 400, with the lower number being much more likely. Those present were from what were later the countries of France, Germany, England, and Spain, and in keeping with the times, would have included not just the prelates who were summoned, but also their servants and officials, making the true number of people in Reims impossible to estimate with any ease.

== Council ==
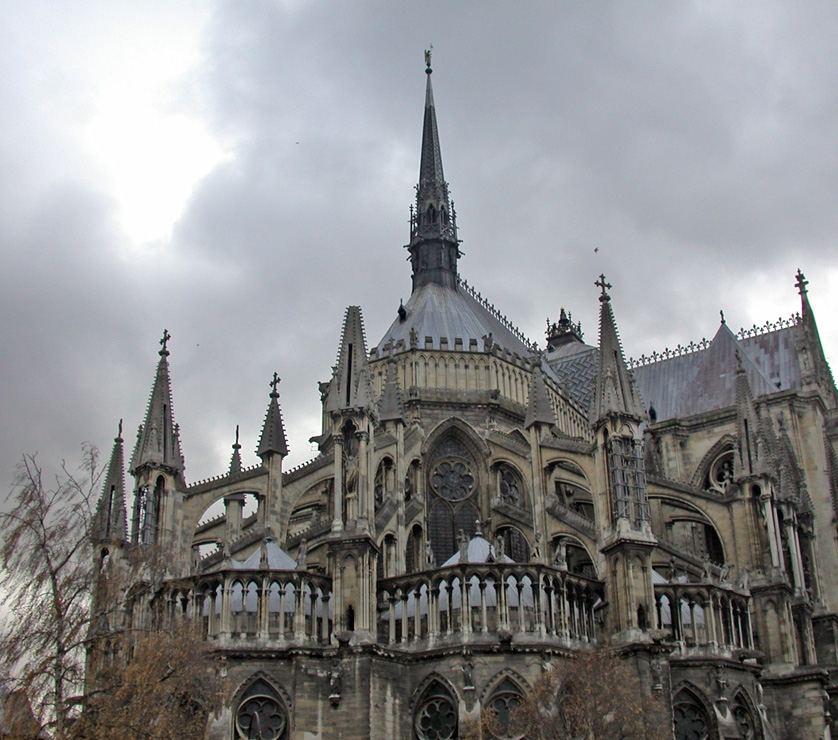
The council was opened in the Cathedral at Reims

The council opened at Reims Cathedral on Sunday 21 March 1148. Pope Eugene and his attendants had arrived in Reims by 9 March. The main business of the council was to debate a number of canons. Most of these were not new measures, since they had been promulgated by Eugene's predecessor at the councils of Reims in 1131 and at the Lateran council of 1139. All of the proposed canons were approved, except for one on clerical attire which was opposed by Rainald of Dassel and other German ecclesiastics. This canon had prohibited cloaks made of fur. Another canon condemning clerical marriage was greeted with amusement, as the council members felt that all clergy should already know that marriage was forbidden to them.

The Reims council also condemned Éon de l'Étoile, a Breton heretic, and ordered his arrest. He was eventually tortured into confession and imprisoned until his death in 1150. Further decrees condemned the Anacletans and supporters of an earlier antipope, who had previously been condemned in 1136. Further side business was the settling of a dispute between two Norman abbots, Eustachius of Jumièges Abbey and Robert of the Abbey of St. Vincent, Le Mans, an issue which was delegated to two cardinals to decide. They reached a decision on 5 April. Other disputes, including other cases of contention between abbots, were also handled at the council, although not necessarily during the council deliberations. Also included in the council's business was the confirmation of the excommunication of the Bishop of Dol and the Bishop of Saint-Brieuc. Although it has been said that the Bishop of Orléans and the Bishop of Troyes were deposed by the council, this is erroneous, and probably stemmed from the number of ecclesiastics who were suspended for non-attendance.

At the council, or shortly after, a number of Churchmen died, including Robert de Bethune, Bishop of Hereford, who fell ill on the third day of the council and died on either 14 or 16 April 1148. The Bishop of Angoulême died in June, after attending the council. Albero de Montreuil, Archbishop of Trier, was already so ill he was carried to the council on a horse litter.

== Confession ==
Confession of Faith in the Trinity

1. We believe and confess that God is the simple nature of divinity, and that it cannot be denied in any Catholic sense that God is divinity, and divinity is God. Moreover, if it is said that God is wise by wisdom, great by magnitude, eternal by eternity, one by oneness, God by divinity, and other such things, we believe that He is wise only by that wisdom which is God Himself; that He is great only by that magnitude which is God Himself; that He is eternal only by that eternity which is God Himself; that He is one only by the oneness which is God Himself; that He is God only by that divinity which He is Himself; that is, that He is wise, great, eternal, one God of Himself.
2. When we speak of three persons: Father, Son, and Holy Spirit, we confess that they are one God, one divine substance. And contrariwise, when we speak of one God, one divine substance, we confess that the one God himself, the one divine substance are three persons.
3. We believe (and we confess) that only God the Father and Son and Holy Spirit are eternal, and not by any means other things, whether they be called relations or peculiarities or singularities or onenesses, and that other such things belong to God, which are from eternity, which are not God.
4. We believe (and confess) that divinity itself, whether you call it divine substance or nature, is incarnate only in the Son.

== Consistory ==
Although the council probably ended on 1 April, Eugene asked a number of attendees to stay after the formal close of the council to consider the case of Gilbert of Poitiers, who was under investigation for heresy, connected with his teachings. The main concern against Gilbert seems to have been his convoluted vocabulary and style of writing, which led to his writings being easily misunderstood. The specific problem came when Gilbert's writings attempted to explicate the relationship between God and his "divinity", which led to his opponents claiming that Gilbert was attempting to create two Gods, rather than just one. His opponents claimed that this occurred in Gilbert's treatise on Boethius' theological work De Trinitate.

Gilbert had previously been investigated by Eugene at Paris in April 1147, but this hearing came to nothing for two reasons. One was that Gilbert's opponents were not unified in what they opposed in Gilbert's teachings. The second reason was that no one had a copy of the treatise on Boethius by Gilbert that was in dispute. Prior to the second hearing at Reims, Bernard of Clairvaux, who was opposed to Gilbert's teachings, held a private meeting with a number of the attendees, where Bernard attempted to pressure them to condemn Gilbert. This offended the various cardinals in attendance, who then proceeded to insist that they were the only persons who could judge the case.

Although connected with the council, Gilbert was tried after the council closed, at a consistory held in the Archbishop of Reims' chambers. A consistory was a specialized form of trial held to investigate questionable theological teachings, and was beginning to be used for this purpose in this period. The consistory lasted two days, and included John of Salisbury, who had previously been a student of Gilbert's, but was now in Eugene's service. The trial likely took place on 2–3 April 1148, as it lasted took two days, and most accounts state that it took place during the week before Palm Sunday, which was 4 April that year. As the consistory took place after the closing of the council on 1 April, that only allows 2 and 3 April for the trial. However, if the council closed earlier than 1 April, then the trial could have taken place on 29–30 March 1148. In the end, no verdict of heresy was placed against Gilbert, who remained Bishop of Poitiers until his death in 1154.

Besides Bernard, other ecclesiastics in opposition to Gilbert were Robert of Melun and Peter the Lombard. Robert was a teacher at both Paris and Melun, and later became Bishop of Hereford. Another opponent was Otto of Freising, who was unable to attend the trial.

No official records of the trial were kept, which subsequently led to considerable confusion.
