= Papal judge-delegate =

Type of medieval ecclesiastical judge

A papal judge delegate was a type of judicial appointment created during the 12th century by the medieval papacy where the pope would designate a local judge, often an ecclesiastic, to decide a case that had been appealed to the papal court.

== History ==
The system began during the pontificate of Paschal II (1099–1118), when the first records appear of the papacy delegating some of its judicial authority to others for the resolution of cases. At first, it was used in order to expedite the discovery of local knowledge of cases, rather than to reduce the papal court's workload. Examples of this early stage include a case from Wales, during the pontificate of Innocent II. This was a dispute between Bernard, the bishop of St Davids, and Urban, the bishop of Llandaff, and was apparently delegated to acquire local knowledge of the dispute. It is only later, during the pontificate of Alexander III that the papal courts appears to have recognized that the delegation system could also reduce the volume of cases that had to be decided at Rome.

An important factor in the growth of the papal judges-delegate system was the corresponding growth of the papal judicial system during the 12th century. Often, cases referred to a judge-delegate were those that were particularly complex, and where the local knowledge of the appointee would be helpful. The appointment ended with the resolution of the case he had been appointed to decide.

The numbers of judges-delegate increased greatly during the 1160s and 1170s. English records for this time are particularly abundant, with a number of English bishops – including Gilbert Foliot, Bartholomew Iscanus, Roger of Worcester – serving over 60 times as judge-delegate for the papacy. Conflicts often arose between papal legates and judges-delegate, and Celestine III ruled that a papal legate could not change the decision of a judge-delegate but was allowed to confirm or implement the decision. Celestine did indicate that the legate was higher in rank than the judge, although he was sovereign in matters relating to his appointed case. Alexander III's decrees on the judicial delegation system form the basis for the description of the system in Gregory IX's Decretales which were published in 1234. Of the 43 items dealing with papal judges-delegate in the Decretales, 18 are Alexander's and a further 15 are from Innocent III.

Papal documents referred to the delegates as iudices delegati. A further development was the grant of exemptions from appointment as judge-delegate, with such exemptions first appearing around 1140. By the end of the 12th century, such exemptions were sought after by local ecclesiastics.
