= Markyate Priory =

Coordinates: 51.84385°N 0.46445°W

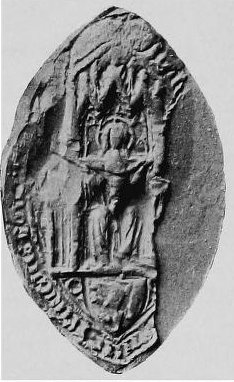
- One of the common seals of the Priory of Markyate, used until at least 1411
- Interactive map of Markyate Priory

Monastery information
- Order: Benedictine
- Established: 1145
- Disestablished: 1537

Site
- Location: Markyate, Caddington, Bedfordshire, England

Markyate Priory was a Benedictine nunnery in Markyate, Bedfordshire, England. It was established in 1145 and disestablished in 1537.

== History ==
The priory of Markyate was founded in 1145, in a wood which was then part of the parish of Caddington, and belonged to the Dean and Chapter of St Paul's Cathedral, London. Ralf de Langford, who was dean at the time, granted the site at a rent of 3 shillings annually; adding to it afterwards another portion at an annual rent of 6 shillings.

As the house was built under the patronage of Geoffrey de Gorham, sixteenth abbot of St Alban's, and endowed by him (though not with the goodwill of his convent) with tithes from Cashio and Watford, it has sometimes been called a cell of that abbey, but this is not an entirely correct description of it, as the patronage remained always with the Dean and Chapter of St Paul's, and the nuns were never exempt from episcopal jurisdiction. There can however be no doubt that in its early days the priory was closely connected with St Alban's, though the history of its origin is somewhat involved in legend.

=== Foundation ===
It is said that a monk called Roger went out from the abbey some time during the reign of Henry I, with the consent of his abbot, to seek a place for a hermitage, and was guided to choose a spot in the woods near Caddington, not far from Watling Street. This Roger, is likely to have been Roger d'Aubigny, a sub-deacon of St Albans Abbey, and brother of Richard d'Aubigny (1087–1119), fifteenth abbot of St Albans.

There he lived for some time in solitude, as he desired, until a young woman came and placed herself under his direction, believing that she had a similar vocation. Her aunt, Alveva, was the mistress of Ranulf Flambard, Bishop of Durham, who, himself, had designs on the young woman. A hermit named Eadwine, with the blessing of the Archbishop of Canterbury, helped her to escape an arranged marriage disguised in men's clothes. He took her to stay with an anchoress at Flamstead named Alfwen, who hid her from her family. There she changed her name from Theodora to Christina.

In 1118 Christina moved to a hermitage at Markyate, where the elderly recluse Roger protected and instructed her. He enclosed her in a shed close by his own hermitage. She became an anchoress, spending her time in prayer. A skilled needlewoman, she supported herself by sewing. When Roger died and was buried at St. Albans, Christina remained at the hermitage; other women, including her sister Margaret, joined her there. It was natural enough that the abbot of St. Albans should take Christina and her associates under his special protection and patronage. Christina took her vows at St Albans in 1131.

In 1145, Markyate Priory was established by Geoffrey, successor to Abbot Richard d'Aubigny. It was dedicated to the Holy Trinity, and the name most commonly given to it was 'Holy Trinity in the Wood'. It seems to have been destroyed by fire almost as soon as built; for Matthew Paris asserts that Abbot Geoffrey built the house twice from the foundation.

The later story says that Christina had great influence with the abbot, and often gave him good advice. There is no doubt of her real existence, as her name appears on the foundation charter and other documents; and an entry on the Pipe Roll of 1156 gives some evidence of the fame to which she attained.

=== Endowments ===
The first endowment of the priory consisted of the demesne lands, granted by the Dean and Chapter of St. Paul's, with another portion of land in the neighbourhood, at a total rent of 9 shillings annually, and tithes from Cashio and Watford, granted by the abbot of St. Alban's. During the lifetime of the first prioress some other small parcels of land in Oxfordshire were acquired, and during the thirteenth century the tithes of Sundon, Streatley, Higham Gobion in Bedfordshre, as well as Buckby in Northamptonshire. There were certainly four churches belonging to it in the thirteenth century, and possibly more.

At the dissolution the Crown bailiff found the house possessed of a manor in Bicester Kings End, Oxfordshire, centred on the manor house Burcester Hall; Livesey; and Stokesby, Norfolk, with parcels of lands in Hertfordshire, Huntingdonshire, Northamptonshire and Cambridgeshire; the tithes of Sundon, Streatley and Watford, in Hertfordshire; Kingsbury, Coleshill and Bickenhill as well as three chapels, all in Warwickshire; and also pensions from Higham Gobion and Buckby in Northamptonshire, Bushey in Hertfordshire, Eversden Parva in Cambridgeshire and Pakinton, amounting altogether to £155 5s. 10¾d. This is in excess of the amount given in the Valor Ecclesiasticus, which is only £114. 16s. 1d. It was never a wealthy house.

In 1259, when the Friars Preachers came to Dunstable, the prioress of Markyate, Agnes Gobion, sent them a certain number of loaves every day for their dinner - "out of pure charity", says the chronicler, because they were then building their church. But her kindness was ill requited, for when the immediate necessity was past, the friars would not allow her to withdraw the dole; they sent to Rome and had it confirmed to them for ever. This grant would not probably be in itself a heavy burden to the priory; but there is no doubt that the nuns had some difficulty in maintaining themselves during the second half of the thirteenth century. Debts began to press heavily; and in 1290 they sent a petition to Parliament to say that if they were to pay all that they owed (more than two hundred marks) they could not possibly live. The relief they asked was not granted, but perhaps they found some other way out of their troubles, for the priory continued to exist. But its poverty was noticed by the bishop of Lincoln, Henry Burghersh, in 1332.

The priory had a warden or master in 1323, like many other nunneries at that time. The number of nuns in 1406 was twelve, and in 1433 there were a prioress, subprioress and nine nuns; it is probable that the revenue would never have supported more.

=== Visitations ===
There are records of several visitations of this house in the episcopal registers. In 1297 it came under the notice of Bishop Sutton. He had heard that the apparitor of Dunstable had cited "certain persons of both sexes living in the priory of Markyate" for immorality, whereby these persons had been defamed, and the house had incurred scandal. Evidently the bishop thought the evidence against them insufficient, for he ordered the archdeacon to see that they were not further molested. It seems improbable from the description that the persons alluded to were religious: they were perhaps boarders taken in during the great necessity of the house. At about the same time the prioress and convent were ordered to repair the chancel of one of their appropriate churches.

In 1300 Bishop Dalderby visited the monastery in person to explain the statute of Boniface VIII, De Claustura Monialium, and found the nuns at first ready to accept it; but when he had concluded his visit, and turned to go, four of them broke away from the rest and followed him to the outer gate, declaring that they would not observe it. Like a wise man, he did not stop then to argue the matter, and went on his way to Dunstable; but the next day he returned to Markyate, inquired the names of the four refractory nuns, and put the whole convent under penance on their account, threatening to excommunicate them if the statute were not observed. But this was not the only house where the bishop had difficulties in enforcing this statute.)

In 1323 a visitation by the warden and the vicar of Kensworth was ordered by Bishop Burghersh, but its results are not recorded; probably there was nothing striking to record, as the house was still in much poverty. In 1333 it was noted that Katherine Tisbury had left, but the Episcopal visitor directed that should she return, she was to be received with kindness.

A scandal was revealed by the visitation of 1434, undertaken by a commission from Bishop Grey. The prioress of the house, Denise Lovelich, was accused of having broken her vow of chastity, to the very evil example of her sisters. She was called upon to purge herself of the charge, but preferred to confess it, and resigned her office in the presence of the assembled convent and the vicar of Kensworth. She was, however, reinstated shortly thereafter, possibly through the influence of her brother, John Lovelich, rector of St. Alphege's in Canterbury.

After a subsequent visitation in 1442, Bishop Alnwick directed the nuns to take meals together in one house, either in the refectory, infirmary or the Prioress’s hall or chamber, and that during mealtimes scripture or saints’ lives be read aloud to them.

=== Dissolution ===
Joan Zouche was the last prioress and appears to have run the priory well, with no infractions reported during visitations. The house was surrendered under the Dissolution of the Lesser Monasteries Act, as its income was less than £200 a year, and there may not have been by this time as many as twelve nuns. The exact date of the surrender is not known, but it must have been some time before 10 February 1537, when the prioress, Joan Zouche, received for the first time her pension of 20 marks.

A manor house, Markyate Cell, was built on the site of the priory. One resident of that house was Lady Katherine Ferrers, an alleged highwaywoman.

== Prioresses of Markyate ==
The Prioresses of Markyate were:

- Christina of Markyate, prioress 1145
- Isabel
- Joan, occurs 1212, 1238
- Agnes Gobion, occurs 1259, died 1274
- Isabel Gobion, elected 1274, resigned 1280
- Alice de Basseville, elected 1280, died 1284
- Lora de Kantia, elected 1284, died 1291
- Maud of Luton, elected 1291
- Bennet or Benedicta of Whitacre, elected 1332
- Joan Power, died 1349
- Alice Spigurnel, elected 1349
- Isabel of Ashby, resigned 1350
- Joan of Stanbridge, elected 1350
- Sibyl Attelburgh, died 1406
- Benington, elected 1406
- Denise Lewelyck, occurs 1431
- Joan Wyrell, elected 1448
- Agnes Stephens, elected 1508, died 1508
- Joan Zouche, elected 1508, surrendered 1536

== Common seals ==
There is a very early seal of the priory attached to a charter of the first prioress, of a light brown colour, pointed oval, representing Our Lord, with cruciform nimbus, seated on a throne, with rainbow behind it, the right hand raised in benediction, the left resting on a book on the left knee. The inscription is illegible, and very little of it remains.

The ordinary chapter seal was a representation of the Holy Trinity, pointed oval: a figure seated upon a throne, holding a crucifix; a crescent on the left and a star on the right. Legend: ..... MUNE C ..... M .....

There is another similar to this, only the figure is under a triple canopy with pinnacles, and has a shield of arms below. Legend: SIGILL' . . . ANCTE TRINITATIS DE . . . .

== See also ==
- List of monastic houses in Bedfordshire
- St. Albans Psalter
