= Historia Anglorum =

Historia Anglorum ("History of the English") is the title of two medieval works on the history of England:

- by Henry of Huntingdon (c. 1154)
- by Matthew Paris (c. 1255)
