= Robert de Chesney =

12th-century bishop of Lincoln

- Bishop of Lincoln
- Diocese: Diocese of Lincoln
- Elected: 13 December 1148
- Term ended: December 1166
- Predecessor: Alexander
- Successor: Geoffrey
- Other post: Archdeacon of Leicester

Orders
- Ordination: 18 December 1148
- Consecration: 19 December 1148 by Theobald of Bec, Archbishop of Canterbury

Personal details
- Died: December 1166

Robert de Chesney (died December 1166) was a medieval English Bishop of Lincoln. He was the brother of an important royal official, William de Chesney, and the uncle of Gilbert Foliot, successively Bishop of Hereford and Bishop of London. Educated at Oxford or Paris, Chesney was Archdeacon of Leicester before he was elected bishop in December 1148.

Chesney served as a royal justice in Lincolnshire during his bishopric and maintained a close relationship with his nephew, Foliot. He was also an early patron of Thomas Becket, and gave the young cleric an office in his diocese early in Becket's career. Although shown favour by King Stephen, including the right to a mint, Chesney was present at the coronation of King Henry II in 1154 and went on to serve Henry as a royal justice. Around 1160, Chesney became embroiled in a dispute with St Albans Abbey in the diocese of Lincoln, over his right as bishop to supervise the abbey. The dispute was eventually settled when the abbey granted Chesney land in return for his relinquishing any right to oversee St Albans.

Chesney was active in his diocese; more than 240 documents relating to his episcopal career survive. They show him mediating disputes between religious houses and granting exemptions and rights in his diocese. Chesney bought a house in London to serve as an episcopal residence, constructed an episcopal palace in Lincoln, and founded a religious house outside the city. He died in December 1166, probably on the 27th, and was buried in Lincoln Cathedral.

== Historical background ==
After King Henry I's death in 1135, the succession was disputed as the king's only legitimate son, William, had died in 1120. The main contenders were the king's daughter Matilda, dowager empress of the Holy Roman Empire, and his nephews Stephen, Count of Boulogne, and Theobald II, Count of Champagne. After Matilda was widowed in 1125, she returned to her father in England, who then secured her marriage to Geoffrey, Count of Anjou. All the magnates of England and Normandy were required to declare fealty to Matilda as Henry's heir, but after Henry I's death in 1135, Stephen rushed to England and had himself crowned, before Theobald or Matilda could react. The Norman barons accepted Stephen as Duke of Normandy, and Theobald contented himself with his possessions in France. But Matilda was less patient: she secured the support of the king of Scotland, David I, her maternal uncle, and the support of her half-brother Robert, Earl of Gloucester, an illegitimate son of Henry I, in 1138. (Note: Henry I had more than 20 illegitimate children.)

Stephen was initially secure on his throne but, by 1139, stresses had appeared. David I invaded England in 1138, and some of the English nobles rebelled, but Stephen had dealt with both threats by April 1139. Later that year, he arrested Roger, the Bishop of Salisbury, and his nephews Nigel, the Bishop of Ely and Alexander, the Bishop of Lincoln, who were not only powerful ecclesiastics but important royal administrators. In September 1139, Matilda landed in England to contest the throne, supported by her half-brother Robert. Stephen himself was captured in February 1141 by Matilda's forces, but Robert's subsequent capture by forces loyal to Stephen later that year allowed his exchange for Stephen in November 1141. The result was an effective stalemate, with Stephen controlling parts of the country and others under the control of Matilda's supporters. During the 1140s, Matilda's husband, Geoffrey of Anjou, wrested Normandy from Stephen.

== Early life ==
Chesney's family originated from Quesnay-Guesnon in the Calvados region of Normandy near Bayeux in France, but they had settled in the Midlands of England and held lands there, particularly in Oxfordshire. His parents were Roger de Chesney and Alice de Langetot. His brother William de Chesney remained a layman and became one of Oxfordshire's leading landowners. Another brother, Reginald, was the abbot of Evesham Abbey. Chesney's sister Agnes was married to Robert Foliot, steward to the Earl of Huntingdon. Agnes and Robert were probably the parents of Gilbert Foliot, later Bishop of Hereford and Bishop of London. Although it is a surmise that Foliot's mother was a sibling of Chesney, it is certain that Chesney was Gilbert's uncle.

Chesney probably attended schools in either Oxford or Paris, as later in life he was referred to with the title of magister, signifying that he was educated. He was Archdeacon of Leicester by about 1146, and held the prebend of Stow. He was also a canon of the chapel of St. George at Oxford Castle.

== Election ==
The west facade of Lincoln Cathedral has the same appearance as it had in Robert's time.

Chesney was elected to the See of Lincoln on 13 December 1148, by his cathedral chapter, apparently without outside interference. He was consecrated by Theobald of Bec at Canterbury Cathedral on 19 December, the day after his ordination as a priest.

Gilbert Foliot's letters provide some background to Chesney's election, showing that King Stephen of England and Stephen's brother Henry of Blois, the Bishop of Winchester, attempted to secure Lincoln for one of their relatives: the royal candidates were the abbots of Fécamp, Westminster, and St Benet's of Hulme. (Note: These three men were Henry de Sully, abbot of Fecamp, Gervase, abbot of Westminster, and Hugh, abbot of St Benet of Hulme. Henry was the son of Stephen's eldest brother, William, count of Chartres. Gervase was the illegitimate son of Stephen. Hugh was the illegitimate son of Stephen's brother Theobald II, Count of Champagne.) They were rejected by Pope Eugene III, paving the way for the chapter to elect Chesney. Foliot relates that the electors from the chapter travelled to London, where they proceeded to elect Chesney in front of Foliot, Theobald, and some other bishops. That account is contradicted by Chesney's profession of obedience to Theobald, which claims that the election took place on 13 December 1148 at Westminster. Henry of Huntingdon and Ralph de Diceto, both medieval chroniclers, approved of the election and mentioned the unanimous nature of Chesney's selection. That Chesney's brother William was a firm supporter of Stephen's probably helped reconcile Stephen and his brother to Chesney's election.

Chesney returned to Lincoln on 6 January 1149, where he received a letter from Arnulf, the Bishop of Lisieux in Normandy, congratulating him on his appointment. Arnulf also asked Chesney to help the cause of Henry fitzEmpress, Empress Matilda's eldest son and a contender for the English throne.

== Bishop under Stephen ==
Correspondence between Chesney and his nephew Gilbert Foliot suggests their relationship was quite close. Foliot strongly supported his uncle's candidacy for Lincoln, writing to Pope Eugene III to encourage papal approval of the election. Foliot later ordered a copy of the Digest for his uncle, which demonstrates Chesney's interest in Roman law. Some of Archbishop Theobald's letters, written to Chesney and recorded in John of Salisbury's collection of letters, contain the earliest recorded quotations from Gratian's Decretum in an English source. They were part of a letter sent by Theobald to Chesney discussing difficult legal cases, and giving advice on how to resolve them.

Shortly after his consecration, Chesney was presented with a copy of the newly updated version of Henry of Huntingdon's Historia Anglorum; Huntingdon had been a fellow archdeacon. Chesney was present at several of King Stephen's courts, and the king named the bishop as the local justice for Lincolnshire.

At the height of the civil war during Stephen's reign, and shortly after Chesney's consecration, the bishop acted as a guarantor for the treaty between Ranulf de Gernon, the Earl of Chester, and Robert de Beaumont, the Earl of Leicester, drawn up to limit the fighting between the two earls during the civil war. Chesney was present at the legatine council held by Theobald in March 1151, and was one of the judges, along with Theobald and Hilary of Chichester, the Bishop of Chichester, in a dispute between the monks of Belvoir Priory and a secular clerk over the right of the clerk to a church. Chesney appointed the future Archbishop of Canterbury, Thomas Becket, to a prebend in his cathedral chapter during the latter part of Stephen's reign.

The civil war ended with the Treaty of Winchester, late in 1153, which provided that Matilda's son Henry would succeed Stephen after his death. When Stephen died the next year, this became a lasting peace. In the last year of Stephen's reign, in mid-1154, Chesney acquired the right to operate a mint in the town of Newark, granted in perpetuity. But as there are no surviving coins, it seems that the mint was not in operation for long. Chesney also acquired the right of justice in the city of Lincoln, and was involved in the commercial life of his diocese, establishing a fair in the town of Banbury in 1154.

== Bishop under Henry II ==
Chesney witnessed a charter of Henry fitzEmpress' before Henry's succession to the throne as Henry II, and was present at the consecration of Roger de Pont L'Évêque as Archbishop of York on 10 October 1154. The bishop then was present at Henry II's coronation on 19 December 1154, and appears to have continued to act as a royal justice in Lincolnshire during the early part of King Henry II's reign; the 1156 Pipe Roll has the sheriff of the county accounting for 10 marks arising from the pleas of the bishop in the county. Chesney was often with the royal court, as he attested a number of Henry II's charters during the early part of the king's reign, and accompanied him to northern England in 1158 and to Normandy in 1160.

The bishop served as the judge in a dispute in 1158 between a dean from the diocese of York and a citizen of Scarborough, in which the layman alleged that the dean had extorted large sums of money from him by repeatedly charging his wife with adultery and fining her. The dean's actions were contrary to a royal decree, but although he appeared before a royal court, he escaped secular penalties because he was a clerk. The result of the case, a precursor to the later Becket dispute, aroused King Henry's anger, but the death of the king's brother, Geoffrey, and the king's subsequent travel to the Continent to deal with that issue meant that the matter was eventually dropped.

In 1161, Chesney became embroiled in a dispute with St Albans Abbey, resulting from his efforts to enforce his right, as bishop, to supervise religious houses within his diocese. Although Pope Alexander III sent a papal bull to England ordering the case to be heard by a panel of two bishops, King Henry II felt that the papal order infringed on his royal rights and had the case decided at the royal court instead. In 1155–1156 St Albans had secured papal privileges from the English Pope Adrian IV, who had previously been a monk there, that exempted the abbey from diocesan supervision, and it was these privileges that Chesney challenged. Chesney secured not only the papal bull but a royal commission to investigate the rights of the abbey as they were in the time of King Henry I. The final disposition of the case took place in 1163, at a royal council at Westminster, where the abbey produced both the papal privileges and a forged charter of Offa of Mercia in support of their case. As Chesney was unable to produce any documents in support of his own position, the king and council told the bishop that they favoured the abbey's cause. The king also ruled that the abbey was a royal proprietary church, and thus had special exemptions. In the end, a compromise was reached, whereby the abbey compensated the bishopric with some land in return for the bishop renouncing his claims.

Early in 1162 Chesney was summoned to Normandy by the king, along with Roger, the Archbishop of York, Hugh de Puiset, the Bishop of Durham, and Hilary of Chichester, to lend their support to the election of Thomas Becket to the see of Canterbury. In July 1163, Chesney was present at the royal court held at Woodstock Palace, which included the Welsh prince Rhys ap Gruffydd, the prince of Northern Wales Owain Gwynedd, and King Malcolm IV of Scotland. The two Welsh princes and the Scots' king did homage to Henry II while at this court. In 1163 Chesney was excused from attending a papal council at Tours because of his health, but he attended the royal councils of Clarendon and Northampton in 1164, which dealt with the growing dispute, now known as the Becket controversy, between the king and Becket. At those councils, Chesney attempted to persuade Becket to compromise, but was unsuccessful. The king subsequently sent Chesney to northern England as an itinerant justice in 1166.

Chesney's contributions to the king's military campaigns on the continent caused him financial difficulties; at the time of his death, he was in debt to a moneylender.

== Diocesan affairs ==
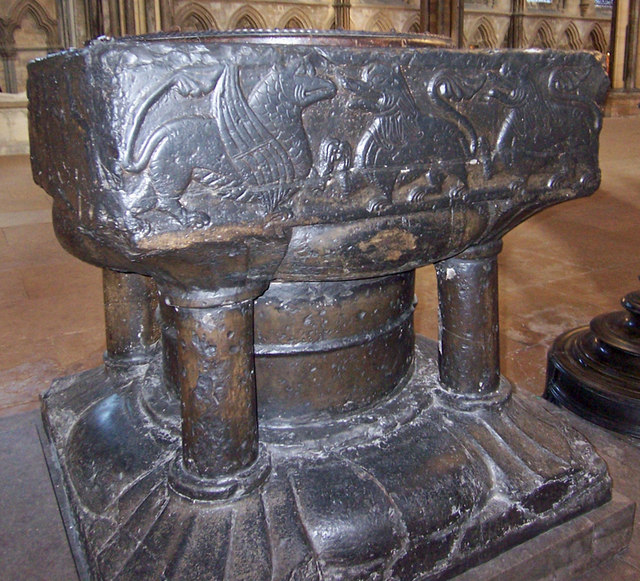
The marble baptismal font in Lincoln Cathedral, likely commissioned by Chesney

Chesney's acta, or documents, contain many examples of him settling judicial disputes, demonstrating how active he was in his diocese. More than 240 of his acta have survived, many of them concerning the religious houses within his jurisdiction. Chesney was appointed a papal judge-delegate at least once, and it was in his court that the case of Philip de Broy, a canon in Bedfordshire, accused of murdering a knight, was heard. The case was one of those that contributed to King Henry's determination that criminous clerks should be subject to royal justice, not just ecclesiastical justice.

In addition to judicial affairs, Chesney worked to ensure good relations with his cathedral chapter and allowed them exemptions from episcopal jurisdiction. He also permitted the clergy of his diocese to remit the payment of chrism money (Note: This was a payment made by parish clergy to the bishop for the chrism they used in ecclesiastical functions. The payment was traditionally made on the fourth Sunday in Lent.) and forwent the traditional annual payment from the archdeacons of the diocese to the bishop. He suppressed unlicensed schools in Huntingdon and employed a number of educated clerks; his acta almost always include one witness entitled magister, and often as many as six.

Chesney was a builder in his diocese, where he ordered the construction of the episcopal palace. He also founded a Gilbertine house of canons just outside the city of Lincoln, the priory of St Catherine, shortly after the order was recognised by the papacy in 1148. Unusually for its time it was only founded for men, although Gilbertine monastic houses typically accommodated both men and women. In 1161 he bought the Old Temple in London as a house for himself. These expenditures contributed to his financial difficulties, along with royal demands, which led to complaints about Chesney's spending. Another cause for complaint was that he gave away some of his estates as marriage portions for his nieces. Chesney was also a benefactor to the town of Banbury, to which he granted the right to hold a fair some time before 1154.

== Death and legacy ==
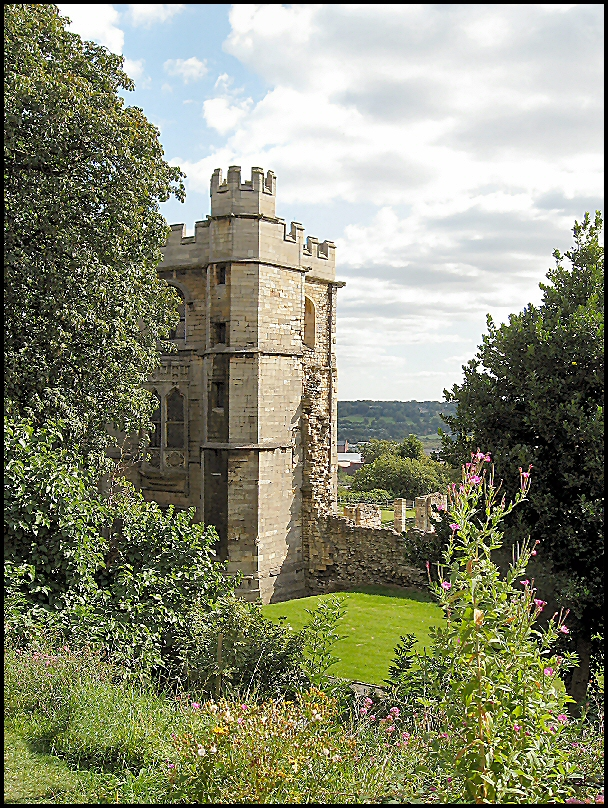
Ruins of the Bishop's Palace in Lincoln, which Chesney helped construct

The exact date of Chesney's death is uncertain. It may have been 27 December 1166; (Note: The historian Katharine Keats-Rohan records his death date as definitively the 27th.) the event is commemorated on both 26 and 27 December. He was buried in the eastern cross aisle of Lincoln Cathedral, along the north side. The modern historian David Knowles wrote that Chesney was "not a man of strong character or decided opinions".

Chesney left at least ten books to Lincoln Cathedral, of which seven survive. Five of the seven show a uniformity of handwriting, leading to speculation that there may have been a scriptorium at Lincoln Cathedral during Chesney's tenure, but other surviving books that were in the cathedral library at the same time do not share any handwriting or other characteristics; Chesney may simply have commissioned the books at the same time from the same scribes. (Note: Six of the surviving books are still at Lincoln Cathedral; the other is in the possession of Balliol College, part of Oxford University. The six manuscripts still at Lincoln are an edition of the letters of Pope Gregory the Great, the Sentences of Peter Lombard, a set of sermons by Geoffrey Babio, the Antiquities of the Jews and The Jewish War by Josephus, a psalter, and sermons by Bernard of Clairvaux. The one book now held by Balliol College is another psalter and probably was already missing from the cathedral library before 1300. It was later owned by William Grey, the Bishop of Ely, who left his library to Balliol College.)

In addition to Foliot, the brothers Gerard, a canon of Lincoln, and Martin, treasurer of Lincoln, were also Chesney's nephews. He may also have been related to Fulk de Chesney, another canon at Lincoln. Chesney helped to further the career of Richard Barre, who became a writer and a royal judge and first appears in the record as a witness to some of Chesney's documents during 1160–1164. Geoffrey of Monmouth's last work, the Vita Merlini, was dedicated to Chesney. Foliot owned a copy of the Digest, part of the Corpus iuris civilis, that had originally been glossed for Chesney.

Traditionally, Chesney's predecessor Alexander, has been credited with commissioning the baptismal font in Lincoln Cathedral, made of Tournai marble. Recent scholarship has cast doubt upon this idea and suggests that the font was instead carved on Chesney's orders and commissioned after 1150.

== Citations ==
Catholic Church titles
Preceded by Alexander	Bishop of Lincoln; 1148–1166	Succeeded by Geoffrey Plantagenet
