= Alexander of Lincoln =

12th-century bishop of Lincoln

- Bishop of Lincoln
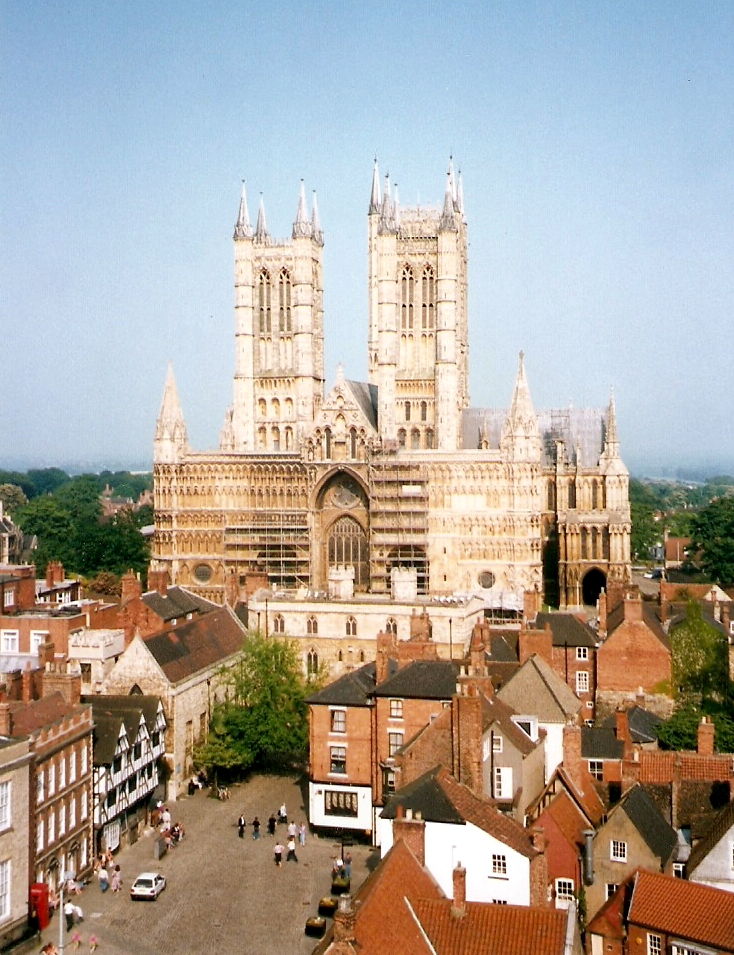
- West front of Lincoln Cathedral, which was begun under Alexander
- Appointed: April 1123
- Predecessor: Robert Bloet
- Successor: Robert de Chesney
- Other post: Archdeacon of Salisbury

Orders
- Consecration: 22 July 1123

Personal details
- Died: February 1148

Alexander of Lincoln (died February 1148) was a medieval English Bishop of Lincoln and a member of an important administrative and ecclesiastical family. He was the nephew of Roger of Salisbury, a Bishop of Salisbury and Chancellor of England under King Henry I, and he was also related to Nigel, Bishop of Ely. Educated at Laon, Alexander served in his uncle's diocese as an archdeacon in the early 1120s. Unlike his relatives, he held no office in the government before his appointment as Bishop of Lincoln in 1123. Alexander became a frequent visitor to King Henry's court after his appointment to the episcopate, often witnessing royal documents, and he served as a royal justice in Lincolnshire.

Although Alexander was known for his ostentatious and luxurious lifestyle, he founded a number of religious houses in his diocese and was an active builder and literary patron. He also attended church councils and reorganised his diocese by increasing the number of archdeaconries and setting up prebends to support his cathedral clergy. Under Henry's successor, King Stephen, Alexander was caught up in the fall from favour of his family, and was imprisoned together with his uncle Roger in 1139. He subsequently briefly supported Stephen's rival, Matilda, but by the late 1140s, Alexander was once again working with Stephen. He spent much of the late 1140s at the papal court in Rome, but died in England in early 1148. During his episcopate, he began the rebuilding of his cathedral, which had been destroyed by fire. Alexander was the patron of medieval chroniclers Henry of Huntingdon and Geoffrey of Monmouth, and also served as an ecclesiastical patron of the medieval hermit Christina of Markyate and Gilbert of Sempringham, founder of the Gilbertines.

== Early life ==
A simplified chart of Alexander's family tree

Alexander was a nephew of Roger, Bishop of Salisbury, probably the son of Roger's brother Humphrey. (Note: Occasionally it is argued that Alexander, and Nigel, were really Roger's sons, but it is unlikely that Alexander was a son of Roger, as Alexander mentions his father and mother as well as his uncle Roger in a charter Alexander granted when founding Haverholme Priory in Lincolnshire.) His mother's name, Ada, is known from the Lincoln Cathedral libri memoriales, or obituary books. Alexander's brother David was archdeacon of Buckingham in the diocese of Lincoln. Other relatives included Nigel, another nephew of Roger's; and Adelelm, later Treasurer of England, who was recorded as Roger's nephew but perhaps was his son. It is possible, although unproven, that Nigel was really Alexander's brother rather than his cousin. Roger's son Roger le Poer, who later became Chancellor of England, was also a cousin. Alexander's cousin Nigel had a son, Richard FitzNeal, who later became Treasurer of England and Bishop of London. Alexander also had a nephew, William, who became an archdeacon, and a great-nephew named Robert de Alvers.

Alexander's birthdate is unknown. Together with his cousin Nigel, he was educated at Laon, under the schoolmaster Anselm of Laon, and returned to England at some unknown date. The historian Martin Brett feels that Alexander probably served as a royal chaplain early in his career, although no sources support this conjecture. Alexander was an archdeacon in the diocese of Salisbury by 1121, under his uncle. While occupying that office he was credited with writing a glossary of Old English legal terms in the Anglo Norman language, entitled the Expositiones Vocabulorum. Unlike his cousin Nigel, Alexander does not appear to have entered the king's household or administration before his appointment as a bishop, and only attested, or witnessed, one royal charter before his appointment to the episcopate in 1123.

== Bishop ==
Alexander was nominated to the see of Lincoln in April 1123 and was consecrated bishop on 22 July 1123, at a ceremony held in Canterbury. He owed his appointment to his uncle's influence with King Henry I; the Peterborough version of the Anglo-Saxon Chronicle noted that Alexander's appointment to the episcopate was done entirely for the love of Roger.

During his time as bishop Alexander secured the submission of St Albans Abbey to his diocese and founded a number of monasteries, including Haverholme Priory (a Gilbertine house), Dorchester on Thames (an Arrouaisian Order house), Louth Park, and Thame; Louth was one of the first Cistercian houses founded in England, and Dorchester was the refoundation of a former collegiate church. During Alexander's episcopate 13 Cistercian abbeys and seven nunneries were founded in his diocese. Alexander himself consecrated the church at Markyate, used by the medieval mystic Christina of Markyate and her nuns, and it was he who consecrated her as a hermit at St Albans Abbey. Alexander also founded a hospital for lepers at Newark-on-Trent.

Although Alexander was a frequent witness to royal charters and documents, there is no evidence that he held an official government position after his appointment as bishop, unlike his relatives Roger and Nigel. Nevertheless, Alexander subsequently appears to have become a regular presence at the royal court. He frequently attested royal charters after 1123, and probably acted as a royal justice in Lincolnshire and the town of Lincoln. He also held the royal castles at Newark, Sleaford, and Banbury, and gave confirmations of grants to the church at Godstow.

Alexander was probably at the 1125 church council held at Westminster by the papal legate John of Crema, and shortly afterwards accompanied the legate on his journey back to Rome. He was still in Rome in 1126, and may have helped to obtain a papal confirmation of his uncle's possession of Malmesbury Abbey, Abbotsbury Abbey, and Horton. At some point during his episcopate, an eighth archdeaconry was established in his diocese, for the West Riding area of Lindsey. Besides these reorganisations, Alexander had a number of clerics in his personal household, including Gilbert of Sempringham, who later founded the Gilbertine order. Other members of the bishop's household were Ralph Gubion, who became abbot of St Albans, and an Italian Bible scholar named Guido or Wido, who taught that subject while serving Alexander.

Alexander presided over the organisation of his diocese into prebends to support the cathedral clergy; he established at least one new prebend and augmented two others. He also attended the church councils in 1127 and 1129 that were convened by William de Corbeil, the Archbishop of Canterbury. Later, during 1133 and 1134, he and the archbishop quarrelled, but the exact nature of their dispute is unknown. William and Alexander travelled to Normandy in 1134 to seek out King Henry to settle their dispute.

== Reign of Stephen ==
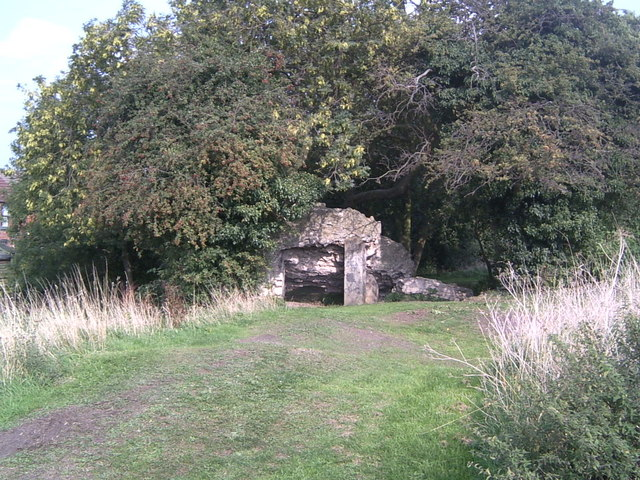
All that remains of Sleaford Castle

After Henry's death in 1135 the succession was disputed between the king's nephews—Stephen and his elder brother Theobald II, Count of Champagne—and Henry's surviving legitimate child Matilda, usually known as the Empress Matilda because of her first marriage to the Holy Roman Emperor, Henry V. King Henry's only legitimate son, William, had died in 1120. After Matilda was widowed in 1125, she returned to her father, who married her to Geoffrey, Count of Anjou. All the magnates of England and Normandy were required to declare fealty to Matilda as Henry's heir, but after Henry I's death in 1135, Stephen rushed to England and had himself crowned, before Theobald or Matilda could react. The Norman barons accepted Stephen as Duke of Normandy, and Theobald contented himself with his possessions in France. But Matilda was less sanguine and secured the support of the Scottish king, David, her maternal uncle, and in 1138 that of her half-brother, Robert, Earl of Gloucester, an illegitimate son of Henry I. (Note: Henry I had more than 20 illegitimate children.)

The election of Theobald of Bec to the Archbishopric of Canterbury was announced at the Council of Westminster in 1138. The medieval chronicler Gervase of Canterbury writes that 17 bishops attended the council, which implies that Alexander was present. (Note: There were only 17 dioceses in England at this time.) After a failed expedition to Normandy in 1137, the influence of Alexander's uncle, Roger of Salisbury, waned at the court of King Stephen, but the king took no action against the family that might incite them to rebel. In early 1139 Stephen may have named William d'Aubigny as Earl of Lincoln, (Note: It is not certain that he was ever actually Earl of Lincoln, as by 1141 he was called Earl of Sussex.) perhaps in an effort to limit Alexander's influence in Lincolnshire.

In June 1139, a knight was killed during a fight in Oxford between a party of Roger of Salisbury's men and a group of noblemen. The king ordered Roger to attend his court to explain the circumstances of the incident and to surrender custody of his castles, which Roger refused to do, resulting in his and Alexander's arrest; Roger's other nephew, Nigel, evaded capture. Another possible explanation for the arrests is offered by the Gesta Stephani, a contemporary chronicle, which reported the king's fear that Roger and his nephews were plotting to hand their castles to the Empress Matilda. Stephen may alternatively have been attempting to assert his rights over the castles and demonstrate his authority over powerful subjects. Alexander was imprisoned in Oxford, in conditions described by some medieval chroniclers as bad.

Since the work of Henry of Huntingdon, who wrote in the years before 1154 and who regarded Stephen's actions as treachery against the clergy that earned him punishment from God, Alexander's arrest has been seen by many historians as a turning point in Stephen's reign. Writing in the 1870s, the historian William Stubbs felt that the arrest destroyed the royal administration, but modern historians have advanced differing explanations for the troubles that followed, not all of which are related to the bishop's arrest.

After Roger and Alexander's arrests, Nigel defied the king. The bishops' castles refused to surrender to the king; therefore, Stephen threatened to starve Alexander and Roger until they did. Sleaford and Newark surrendered and were given into the custody of Robert, the Earl of Leicester. Earl Robert also seized some of Lincoln's episcopal estates that had been disputed between the earl and the bishop. Alexander subsequently excommunicated Earl Robert when the earl refused to return the castle to Alexander's custody. Alexander then successfully applied to Pope Innocent II in 1139 for support in his efforts to recover Newark castle from Earl Robert.

Stephen's brother, Henry of Blois, Bishop of Winchester and one of the king's main supporters, had recently been appointed papal legate. Henry objected to Stephen's actions in arresting the bishops and confiscating their property, as they were in contravention of canon law. Henry called a legatine council, a church council convened by a papal legate, at Winchester to discuss the issue, which ended in nothing being done, although both sides threatened excommunication and stated they would appeal to Rome and the papacy for support. Alexander did not attend the council of Winchester, but his uncle did. He seems to have borne Stephen no ill will over the arrest and worked with the king during Stephen's later reign.

In 1141, Alexander and the citizens of the town of Lincoln requested that Stephen come to Lincoln and intercede with Ranulf de Gernon, the Earl of Chester, who was attempting to enforce what he regarded as his rights to Lincoln Castle. Stephen arrived and besieged Ranulf's wife and half-brother in the castle, but the earl escaped and sought aid from Robert of Gloucester, Matilda's half-brother and leading supporter. Following Robert's arrival in Lincoln, a battle took place there on 2 February 1141, during which Stephen was captured by Matilda's forces. Alexander was present at Oxford in July 1141, when the Empress Matilda held court and attempted to consolidate her hold on England. The citizens of London objected to Matilda's rule when she arrived in their city, and drove her away; Robert of Gloucester was captured shortly afterwards. This reversal of the Empress' fortunes resulted in Stephen's release, after he was exchanged for Robert. The next few years, until 1148, saw a period of civil war in England, often called The Anarchy, when neither Matilda nor Stephen controlled the country.

== Patronage ==
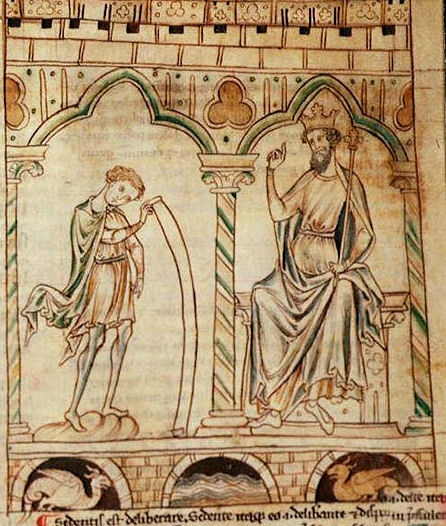
Page from a 13th-century manuscript of the Prophecies of Merlin

Alexander was a supporter of Gilbert of Sempringham's new monastic order of the Gilbertines, and he was also known as a patron of literature. He commissioned Geoffrey of Monmouth to compose the Prophecies of Merlin, which Geoffrey dedicated to him. Alexander was a patron of the medieval chronicler Henry of Huntingdon, and requested that Henry write his historical work.

Alexander rebuilt Lincoln Cathedral after it had been destroyed by fire at an unknown date. He had the roof done with stone vaulting and began construction of the west front of the cathedral, which was finished under his successor. The only remaining major traces of Alexander's work on the west end are the carved doors and the frieze on the west front. The author of the Gesta Stephani claimed that Alexander's additions made Lincoln Cathedral "more beautiful than before and second to none in the realm". Traditionally, Alexander has been credited with the commissioning of the baptismal font in Lincoln Cathedral, made of Tournai marble. Recent scholarship, however, has cast doubt upon this theory and suggests that the font was carved on the orders of Alexander's successor, Robert de Chesney.

Stephen granted to Alexander the land on which the Old Palace of the bishops stands in Lincoln, although it is unclear whether it was Alexander or his successor as bishop who began the construction of the existing building. Stephen's grant added to an earlier one by King Henry, of the Eastgate in Lincoln, as an episcopal residence. Work commissioned by Alexander has survived at the three castles he built at Newark-on-Trent, Sleaford, and probably Banbury.

Alexander's nickname, "the Magnificent", reflected his ostentatious and luxurious lifestyle. Henry of Huntingdon records that this was a contemporary nickname. Alexander was rebuked by Bernard of Clairvaux for his lifestyle. He may have been responsible for the education of an illegitimate son of King Henry's, as two charters of Alexander's are witnessed by a William, who is described as a son of the king. He also advanced the careers of his family, naming his relative Adelelm as Dean of Lincoln during his episcopate. Another member of his household was Robert Gubion, who later became abbot of St Albans Abbey.

The medieval chronicler William of Newburgh wrote that Alexander founded a number of monasteries, "to remove the odium" that he had incurred because of his castle building. Alexander himself stated explicitly that his foundation of Louth was intended to secure the remission of his sins, as well as the salvation of King Henry I, his uncle Roger of Salisbury, and his parents. Alexander also played a part in the founding of Newhouse Abbey in about 1143. Although the actual foundation was by Peter of Goxhill, Alexander and his successor issued confirmation charters and took the new monastery into their protection.

== Death ==
Alexander spent most of 1145 and 1146 at the papal court in Rome, although some time during that period he was in England as one of the witnesses to the peace accord signed between the earls of Chester and Leicester. He returned to the papal court, then at Auxerre, in 1147, but he was back in England by the time of his death the following year. Henry of Huntingdon says that Alexander picked up his last illness while travelling. Alexander died in February 1148, probably on the 20th, as that was the date on which his death was commemorated at Lincoln Cathedral, and he was buried at Lincoln on 25 February 1148. No tomb remains, but 12th-century documents record that Alexander left the cathedral a number of books, mostly biblical works.

== Citations ==
Catholic Church titles
Preceded by Robert Bloet	Bishop of Lincoln; 1123–1148	Succeeded by Robert de Chesney
