= Ralph Gubion =

12th-century English monk and abbot

- Abbot of St Albans
- Elected: 1146
- Term ended: 1151
- Predecessor: Geoffrey de Gorham
- Successor: Robert de Gorron

Personal details
- Died: 6 July 1151

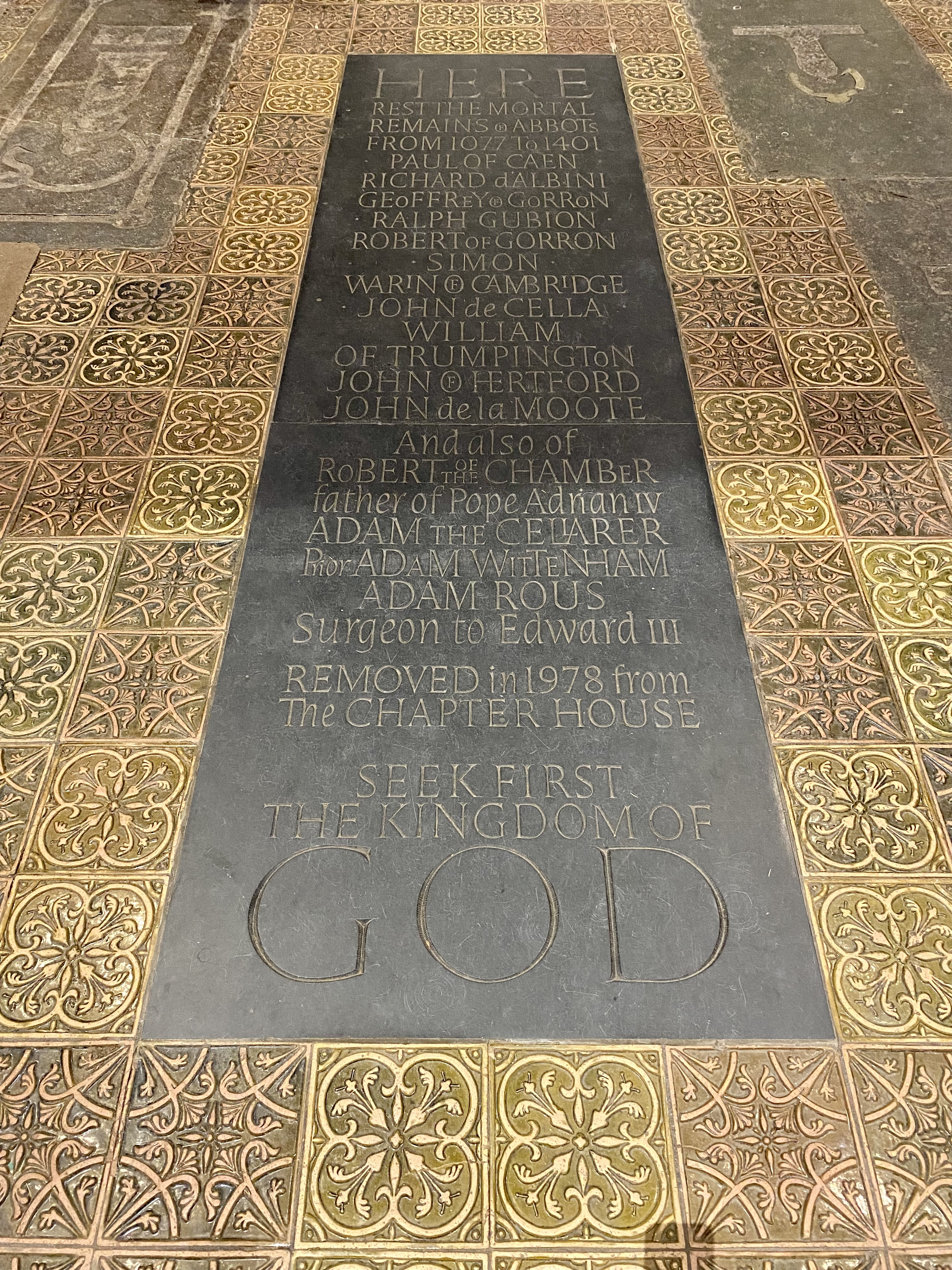
Stone marking the 1978 reburial of the remains of Gubion and other Abbots of St Albans at St Albans Cathedral

Ralph Gubion (died 6 July 1151) was a native Englishman and abbot of St Albans Abbey from 1146 to 1151.

Gubion was a native of England, although his surname indicates that his family was likely from Normandy or Brittany. Gubion was a monk at St Albans as well as being a clerk in the household of Alexander, Bishop of Lincoln. Through the intercession of Alexander, Gubion was allowed to be simultaneously a monk at St Albans as well as continuing as Alexander's personal chaplain. Gubion had also served as Alexander's treasurer. He occurs in a charter of the cathedral of Lincoln that is probably dated to the later half of 1147, but this cannot be taken as sure evidence that he was a canon of the Lincoln cathedral chapter. On 8 May 1146 he was elected abbot, and held office until 1150, when he became ill and handed a number of his duties to the prior. He died on 6 July 1151.

While abbot, he was alleged to have abused and tormented the prior of St Albans, Alcuin; eventually Alcuin transferred to Westminster Abbey to escape. Gubion appointed Robert de Gorron, who was the nephew of Gubion's predecessor – Geoffrey de Gorham – as abbot, as the new prior. Gubion also set the finances of the abbey on a firm footing, and obtained favourable privileges for the abbey from Pope Eugenius III.

Gubion was succeeded by the prior, Robert de Gorron. Gubion was noted as a great lover of books.
