= Christina of Markyate =

English anchoress, c. 1096/1098 – c. 1155

St Alban's Psalter Psalm 105 initial
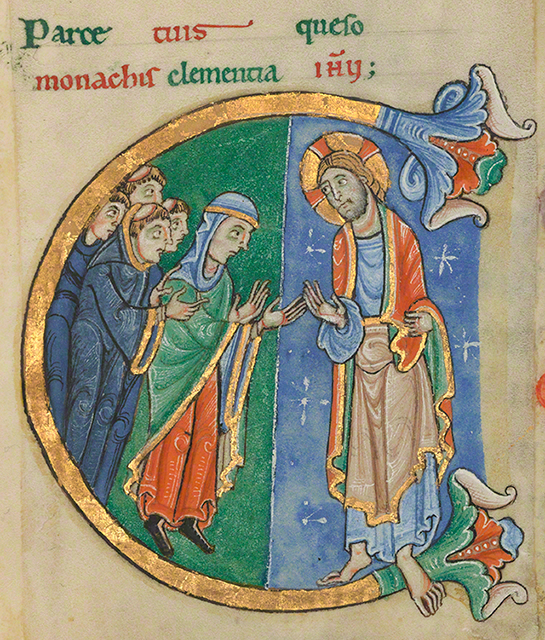
- Image from St. Alban's Psalter thought to portray Christina of Markyate (opening of Psalm 105, p. 285)

Christina of Markyate was born with the name Theodora in Huntingdon, England, about 1096–1098 and died about 1155. She was an anchoress, who came from a wealthy English family trying to accommodate with the Normans at that time. She later became the prioress of a community of nuns.

== Early life ==
Originally named Theodora, she was born into a wealthy merchant family. Her mother's name was Beatrix, marking an effort to appear more Norman, and her father's was Auti. Her mother told a story of "knowing" her daughter would be holy because a dove had flown into her sleeve and lived there for seven days while she was pregnant.

As a child, Theodora is said to have talked to Christ "as if he were a man whom she could see." She befriended an older man named Sueno, who became her first religious mentor. Her hagiography states that Sueno had once led an unholy life and that Christina's faith renewed his, so that they helped each other. Theodora visited St Alban's Abbey in Hertfordshire with her parents in her youth and the visit apparently instilled in her the deep faith that prompted her to make a private vow of chastity. She told Sueno of this, but no one else.

== Marriage ==
While visiting an aunt, Elfgifu, Theodora met Bishop Ranulf Flambard. Her aunt was the bishop's concubine and Ranulf lusted after young Theodora, seeking to make her another one of his concubines. According to one account, when Ranulf attempted to force his attentions on her, Theodora suggested that she lock the door to guarantee their privacy. When he agreed, she proceeded to do so, from the outside, trapping him within. Rebuffed, he then exacted revenge by brokering a marriage for her with a young nobleman named Beorhtred. A burlesque-tinged tale of the nocturnal seduction of Flambard's niece and her resulting forced marriage is also found in the margins of the Council of Westminster in September 1125.

Theodora's parents readily agreed, but Theodora did not, in view of her vow. Her angry parents arranged for Beorhtred to have access to her room, only to discover next morning that the two had spent the night discussing religious subjects. On one occasion Theodora recounted the life of St Cecilia, who according to legend, was guarded on her wedding night by a vengeful angel. On another occasion, she hid behind a tapestry while Beorhtred searched for her in vain. As word went round of Theodora's plight, a hermit named Eadwine, with the blessing of the Archbishop of Canterbury, helped her to escape disguised in men's clothes. Eadwine then took her to stay with an anchoress at Flamstead named Alfwen, who hid her from her family. There Theodora changed her name to Christina.

== Anchoress ==
Christina next found shelter with Roger, a hermit and sub-deacon of St Alban's Abbey, whose cell was at Markyate. This Roger, who died before 1118 and whose death anniversary (12 September) is recorded in the St Albans Psalter, is likely to have been Roger d'Aubigny, a brother of abbot Richard d'Aubigny (1087–1119) and father of William d'Aubigny (Pincerna). Christina spent her time there in prayer, sewing to support herself. She was a skilled needleworker who later embroidered three mitres for Pope Adrian IV. After two years, Beorhtred released Christina from their marriage contract, and Archbishop Thurstan of York formally annulled the marriage in 1122. Thereafter, Christina was able to come out of hiding and move into a small hut.

== Prioress ==
When Roger died, Christina took over the hermitage near St Alban's Abbey, where she reportedly experienced frequent visions of Jesus, Mary, and St Margaret. Other women, including her sister Margaret, joined her there. Christina took her vows at St Albans in 1131. Markyate Priory was established in 1145.

Geoffrey de Gorham became abbot of St Albans in 1119, and Christina as prioress became his close friend and counsellor. Their friendship was such that he is said to have altered the St Albans Psalter as a gift for her, by having an illuminated "C" placed at the beginning of Psalm 105. Images of each page of the Psalter with transcriptions and translations of the text can be found on the online St Albans Psalter project. Medieval scholar Katie Ann-Marie Bugyis argues that both the image and text in the Psalter supported attempts by members of the St Albans community to "refashion Christina into a new Magdalene" in order to legitimize her authority there and her spiritual direction of the monks who resided there, and especially their abbot. Bugyis goes on to state that the illumination, 'may open a rich tradition of religious women bearing Christ's good news through reading, copying, and proclaiming the gospels.'

== Hagiography ==
Christina's Latin Vita was apparently written by a monk of St Alban's Abbey. This hagiography is considered to be one of the most realistic known. Christina is shown as having power as Prioress of Markyate. She is also one of very few shown to have sexual desire, even though she overcomes it.

Christina's sister, Margaret of Markyate, who the Vita describes as an important member of their community and most likely served as their sacristan, may have been responsible for writing the first accounts about Christina, which the writer of the Vita possibly incorporated and consulted. The writer consulted Christina to confirm his work, but she proved to be a noncompliant source, so he turned to Margaret on three occasions to corroborate details about three miracles and visions that Christina had experienced. As Bugyis states, "[Christina] clearly trusted that Margaret would not only be an attentive and patient listener, but also gave unquestioning credence to her account". Bugyis also reports that the writer of the Vita highly valued Margaret's authority about her sister's life. Bugyis calls Margaret Christina's "primary witness to her thoughts, words, and deeds" and "the primary conduit" of detailed reports of Christina's visions, provided for the monks and abbot at St Albans, who were responsible for the production of the Vita, possibly into the 1130s. Bugyis also reports that both Christina and Margaret believed that Christina's miracles were as important as the ones recorded in Pope Gregory I's Dialogues and also warranted being recorded so that others could be exposed to them as well.

The first instance was a vision Christina experienced about the healing of Geoffrey de Gorham. Christina entrusted Margaret with passing it onto him; as Bugyis states, "Christina committed her memory of the vision to her sister's keeping; Margaret in turn committed it to Geoffrey's; and at some point, whether at Christina's, Margaret's, or Geoffrey's initiative, it was committed to writing, given that we now have a record of it in the Vita". In the second instance, Christina used Margaret and two other women at Markyate to confirm her prediction that Geoffrey would visit them. In the third instance, both Christina and Geoffrey experienced a vision in which Christina appeared to him at his bedside; the following morning, he sent his relative to Markyate to report it to Christina. Before he could do so, Christina summoned Margaret, who related that Christina had told her about a dream she had the night before about her appearance at Geoffrey's bedside. Christina called upon Margaret to authenticate these miracles and visions in all three instances.

Christina's Vita contains an account of another miracle, which was full of eucharistic imagery, in which Christ appears as an unknown pilgrim at both St Albans and Markygate, where Christina and her sister Margaret welcome him as their guest. According to Bugyis, the meal Christina, Margaret, and their guest place them "in the respective roles of contemplative repose and active labor", in what Bugyis calls "a dramatic reenactment" of Mary and Martha's contemplation and labor in the New Testament. Bugyis states that the account in Christina's Vita is reminiscent, although not as explicit as the parallel with the Mary and Martha story, is also a re-enactment of the narrative in the Gospel of Luke about Christ's encounter and meal, after his death and resurrection, with the two disciples travelling to Emmaus. Buygis states that when the hagiography's author's account of the meal is "read through the hermeneutical lens of both stories, the reason for his narrative sleight of hand becomes more apparent: he interpreted Christina and Margaret's act of hospitality as a kind of eucharistic ministry".

Bugyis also states the pilgrim's act of eating the bread in Christina's Vita is suggestive of the act of Communion in the Mass. However, Bugyis disagrees with C.H. Talbot's translation of the Vita, arguing that the text implies that one of the sisters, likely Margaret, placed the bread in the pilgrim's mouth, as is often done during Communion. In Bugyis' interpretation, "the meal she [Margaret] prepared and distributed to the pilgrim becomes more than mere food; it becomes a type of the Eucharist, and she becomes a kind of sacristan or priest". The writer of the text uses "veiled" language to describe the scene, having the pilgrim refuse their offer of fish because he only required enough fish to live spiritually, leaving the interpretation of the meal up to his readers. According to Bugyis, the writer of the Vita, as well as Christina and Margaret, were probably familiar with other artistic depictions of the meal at Emmaus, even though Bugyis admits that they interpreted the meal as a reenactment of the story, but states, "Either way, the writer encouraged a eucharistic reading of this reading through subtle parallelism with the gospel's narrative.". Bugyis goes on to say that the story reveals the "euchartistic connotations that were read into monastic hospitality".

Her hagiography is incomplete. Parts were lost in a fire in the 18th century and it is unknown whether the biographer wrote the account before or after her death. There are no manuscript versions of the Vita during the 12th century.

In the light of the Priory's legal foundation by St Paul's, the friendship of Christina and Geoffrey may have been exaggerated by Abbot Robert de Gorron (1151–1166) and by the chronicler Matthew Paris (c. 1200–1259), whose chronicle alleges that St Alban's Abbey had clerical competence over the nuns of Markyate. "It would almost seem that in the Gesta Abbatum the origins of Markyate and Sopwell have been confused. There Markyate Priory is said to have arisen through occupation of the hermitage of Roger, a former monk of St Albans, by a saintly recluse called Christina, for whom Abbot Geoffrey built a house. In reality, Markyate was not dependent on St Albans, as it would have been if founded by the abbot, and as Sopwell was." According to Berhard Gallistl, this makes it "very possible that what we are dealing with here is a later piece of fiction from a monastic chronicler." A medieval cult of the anchoress Christina is not substantiated by liturgical or historical sources. However, the Vita's existence and references to Christina in Gesta Abbatum Monasterii Sancti Albani still suggest interest in instigating such a cult in the 13th and 14th centuries.

== See also ==
- Women in Anglo-Saxon society

.

== Works cited ==
- Bugyis, Katie Ann-Marie (2019). The care of nuns : the ministries of Benedictine women in England during the central Middle Ages. New York, NY. ISBN 978-0-19-085129-3. OCLC 1090397171.
- Gallistl, Bernhard (2018). ""A book for Avicia?" Der Eremit Roger im Psalter von St. Albans". Concilium Medii Aevi. 21: 1–52. ISSN 1437-904X.
