= Abbot of St Albans =

This is a list of abbots of St Albans Abbey up to its Dissolution in 1539.

1. Willegod (793–796)
2. Eadric
3. Wulsig
4. Wulnoth (Walworth) (c. 930)
5. Eadfrith
6. Wulsin (d. c. 968)
7. Aelfric
8. Ealdred
9. Eadmer
10. Leofric
11. Ælfric of Abingdon (d. 1005)
12. Leofstan
13. Frithric (Frederic)
14. Paul of Caen (1077–1093)
15. Richard d'Aubeney (1097–1119)
16. Geoffrey of Dunstable (1119–1146)
17. Ralph Gubion (1146–1151)
18. Robert de Gorron (1151–1166)
19. Symon (1167–1183)
20. Warin (1183–1195)
21. John de Cella (1195–1214)
22. William of Trumpington (1214–1235)
23. John of Hertford (1235–1263)
24. Roger de Norton (1263–1291)
25. John of Berkhamsted (1291-1302)
26. John de Maryns (1302–1308)
27. Hugh of Eversden (1308–1327)
28. Richard of Wallingford (1326–1335)
29. Michael of Mentmore (1335–1349)
30. Thomas de la Mare (1349–1396)
31. John de la Moote (1396–1401)
32. William Heyworth (1401–1420)
33. John of Wheathampstead (John Whethamstede) (1420–1440) (resigned 1440)
34. John Stoke (1440–1451)
35. John of Wheathampstead (1451–1465) (appointed for a second time, 1451)
36. William Albon (1465–1475)
37. William of Wallingford (1476–1492)
38. Thomas Ramryge (1492–1520)
39. Thomas Wolsey (1521-1529/1530), Commendatory abbot
40. Robert Catton (1529–1538)
41. Richard Boreman alias Stevenage (1538–1539), last abbot

== Sources ==
- British History Online - St Albans Abbey
- Gesta Abbatum (Riley ed., 1867) p. xx
- History of Verulam (S.G.Shaw, 1815)
