= Cell Park =

- Markyate Cell
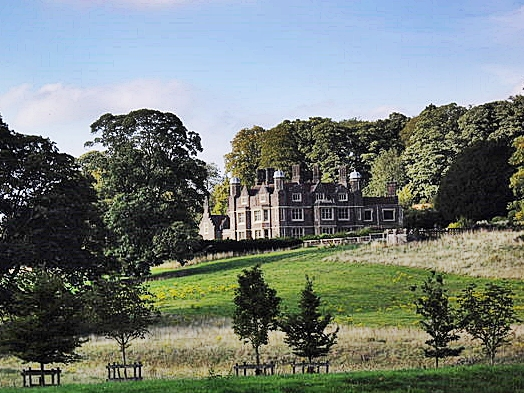

- Location within Hertfordshire
- 51°50′37″N 0°27′52″W
- Type: Country house
- Location: Markyate
- OS grid reference: TL 05882 17246

History
- Built: 1539−1540
- Rebuilt: 1908

Site notes
- Area: Hertfordshire

Listed Building – Grade II*
- Official name: Cell Park
- Designated: 19 March 1987
- Reference no.: 1173939

Cell Park (previously known as Markyate Cell) is a country house in Markyate, Hertfordshire near Luton, England. The house dates from the 16th century, has been modified at various times since then and was largely rebuilt in 1908 after a fire. It stands in 79 acres of land and is a Grade II* listed building.

The hall is a rectangular brick-built structure with corner turrets, linked by an arcade to service buildings forming a quadrangle. The house was originally built c. 1539 for Humphrey Bouchier on land previously belonging to the suppressed Markyate Priory. The house was subsequently extended and remodelled in the 17th century for the Ferrers and the Coppin families. It was remodelled again in 1825 to create the present layout by Robert Lugar for Daniel Goodson Adey. Sir John de Fontblaque Pennefather made further changes in the early 20th century, moving the entrance and creating a ballroom from the arcade. It was on sale in 2014 for £4.5m, and as of 2023 is on sale again for £5.7m.

The hall is known for being the home of Lady Katherine Ferrers, reputedly the "Wicked Lady", a 17th-century highwaywoman who operated in Hertfordshire and was eventually shot. The hall had a secret staircase hidden behind the fireplace, and Lady Katherine would allegedly dress in men's clothes and exit via the staircase to escape into the night.
