= St. Albans Psalter =

English illuminated manuscript from the 12th century

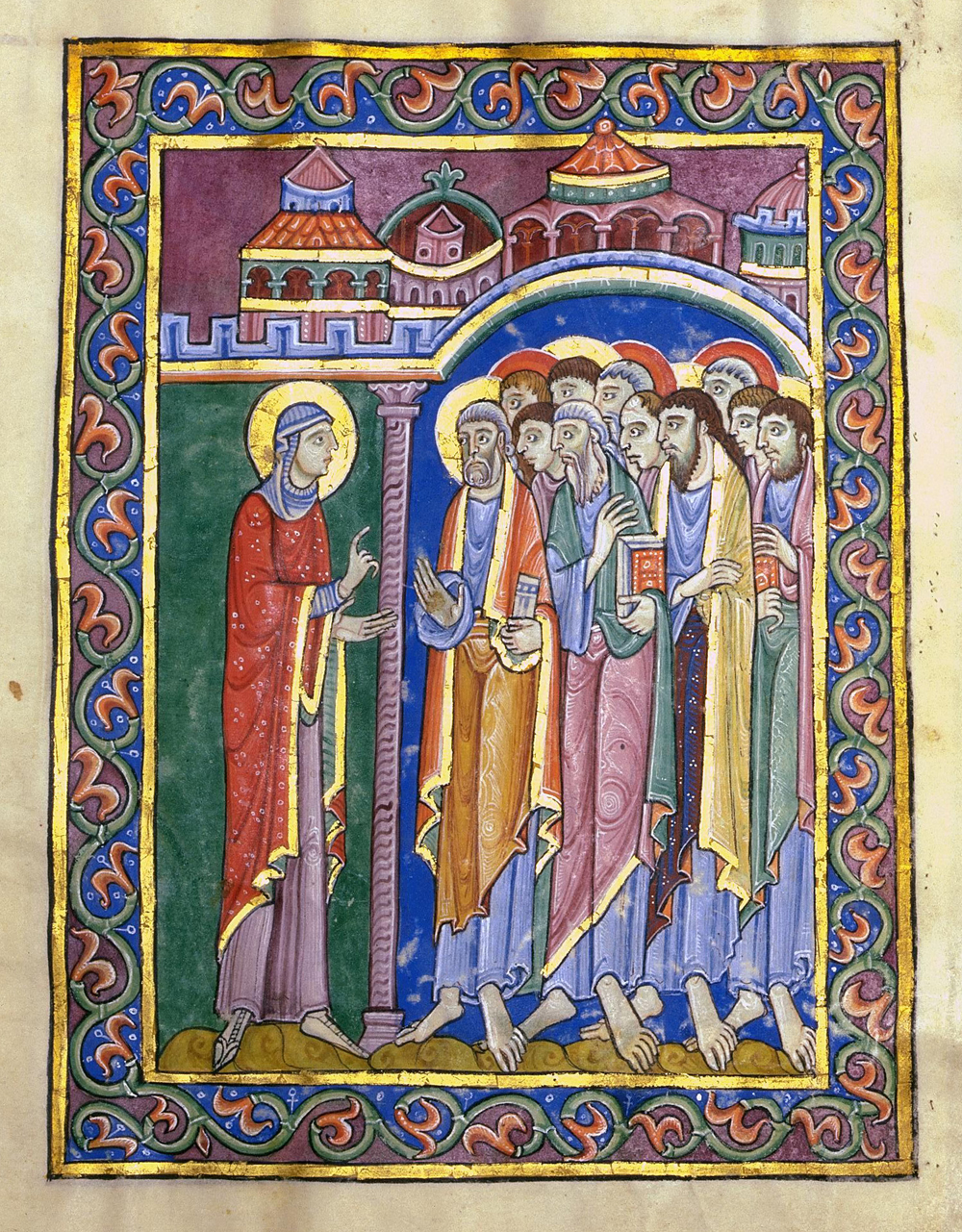
Mary Magdalene announces the Risen Christ

The St Albans Psalter, also known as the Albani Psalter or the Psalter of Christina of Markyate, is an English illuminated manuscript, one of several psalters known to have been created at or for St Albans Abbey in the 12th century. It is widely considered to be one of the most important examples of English Romanesque book production; it is of almost unprecedented lavishness of decoration, with over forty full-page miniatures, and contains a number of iconographic innovations that would endure throughout the Middle Ages. It also contains the earliest surviving example of French literature, the Chanson de St Alexis or Vie de St Alexis, and it was probably commissioned by an identifiable man and owned by an identifiable woman. Since the early 19th century it has been owned by the church of St. Godehard in Hildesheim, Lower Saxony in northwestern Germany, but is now stored and administered at the nearby Dombibliothek (Cathedral Library) in Hildesheim Cathedral. A single leaf from the manuscript is at the Schnütgen Museum, Cologne; one further leaf, and one further cutting, are missing from the volume, their whereabouts unknown.

== Contents ==
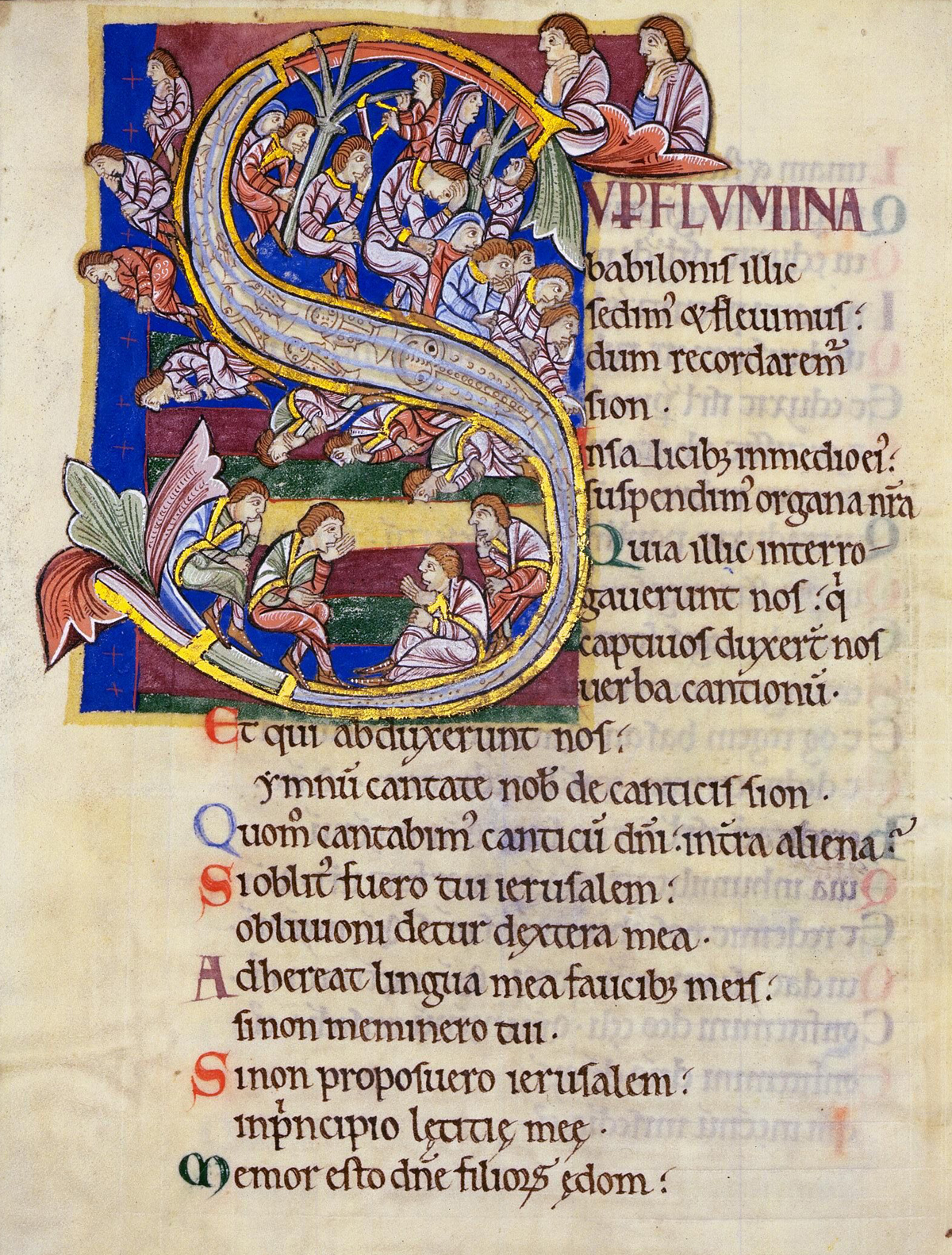
Psalm 137 Initial S

The manuscript as it survives in Hildesheim has 209 folios (i.e. 418 pages) of vellum, which are numbered by a modern hand in Arabic numerals in the top right corner of the rectos, and there is an additional numbering of the miniatures at the bottom of their pages. A full page measures 27.6 x 18.4 cm. There are many signs that the pages have been trimmed down from their original size. The binding is of leather, and medieval, although it was restored in modern times, perhaps the 1930s.

The manuscript is composed of five physically separable parts:

- I. (Quire 1; pp. 1–16) Calendar and computistical material
- II. (Quires 2-4; pp. 17–56) Series of full-page miniatures
- III. (Quire 5; pp. 57–72) A quire containing:
  - a miniature and text of the Chanson de St Alexis,
  - Gregory the Great's defence of the use of images, in Latin and French translation,
  - three miniatures depicting the Gospel Emmaus story,
  - a drawing of two battling knights, with accompanying text, and
  - a Beatus initial, with accompanying text
- IV. (Quires 6-23; pp. 73–414) Psalms, Canticles, Litany, and Collects
- V. (part of Quire 23; pp. 415–418) A bifolium with two full-page miniatures (pp. 416–417) depicting the Martyrdom of St Alban, and King David with musicians

== Date and origin ==
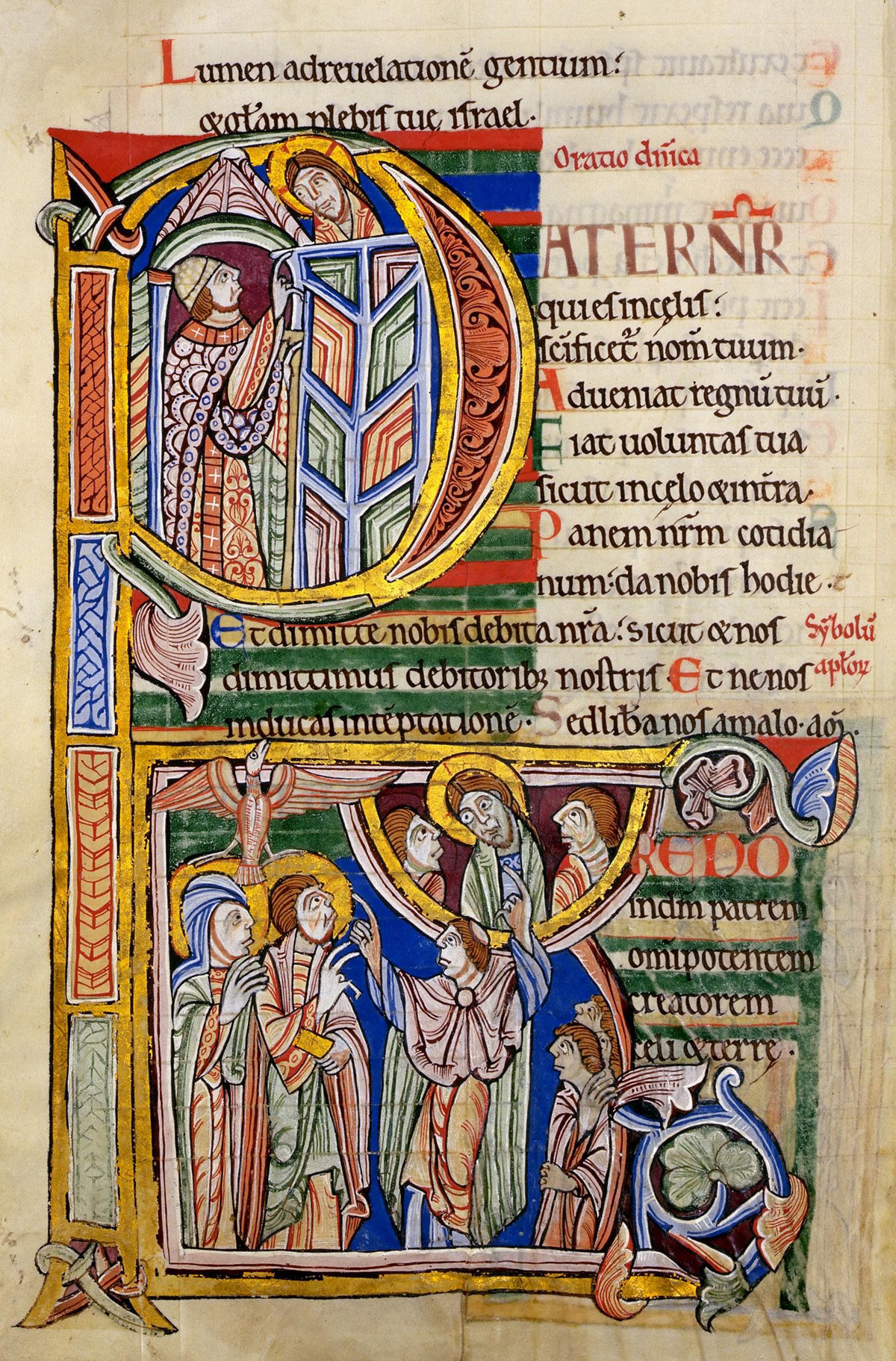
Initial at the start of the "Our Father"

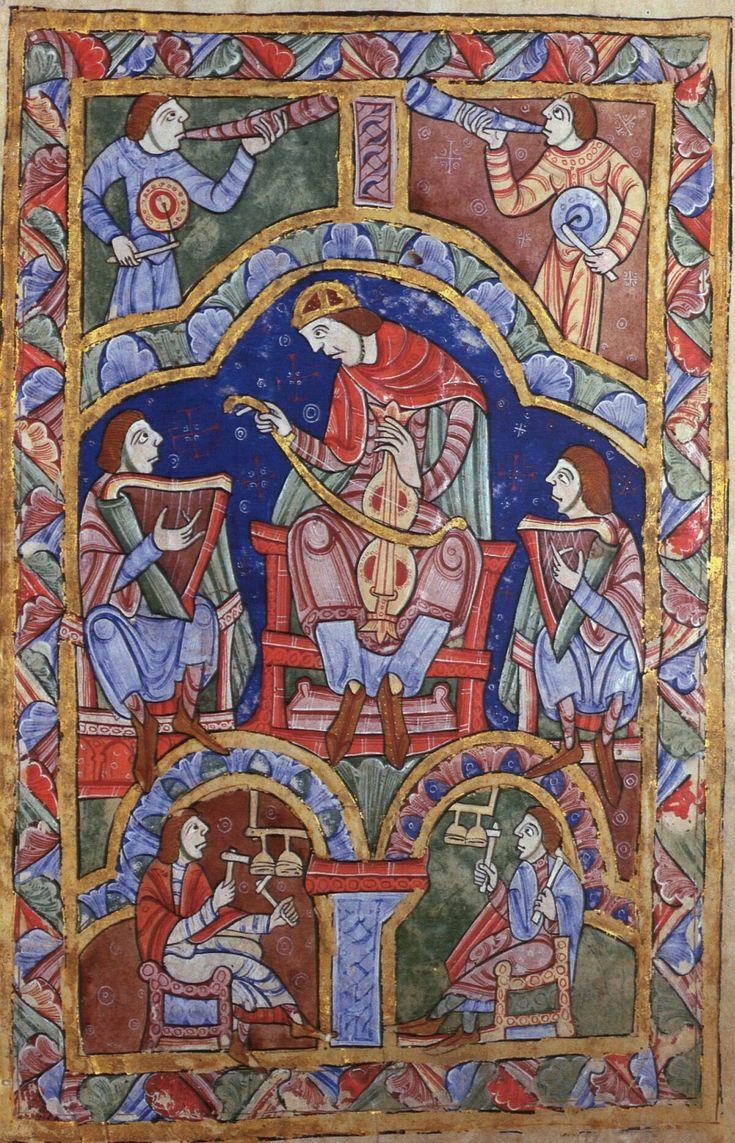
Page 417: David playing lyra (center), surrounded by (top) musicians with wooden trumpets and nakers, (center) musicians with harps, (bottom) musicians with cymbala (bell chimes).

Scholarly opinion differs on many of the details, but there is general agreement that the psalter was created at St Albans Abbey. The first editor Adolph Goldschmidt considered Roger († ante 1118), hermit and monk of St Albans, to be the scribe of the psalms. The hermit Roger, whose death anniversary (12 September) is recorded in the calendar, is likely to be identical with Roger d'Aubigny, a brother of abbot Richard d'Aubigny (1087-1119) and father of William d'Aubigny (Pincerna) and Nigel d'Aubigny. According to subsequent scholars the St Albans Psalter came into being only during the abbacy (1119-1146) of Geoffrey de Gorham or Gorron, and it was possibly owned by Christina of Markyate (c. 1098-c. 1155-1166), anchoress and later prioress of Markyate, or at least associated with her at some point after her death. If she did indeed own it, it is not clear whether the manuscript was intended for her from the beginning, whether it was adapted for her while it was being made, or whether it became hers after its completion; recent research remains divided on this issue. Additions were made to the manuscript at various times until after her death, which is recorded in the calendar.

Little is known about the origins of the St. Albans monastery; however, tradition claims that the monastery was founded in approximately 793 by King Offa of Mercia.[1] When it was established, the abbey housed both men and women and followed the rule of Saint Benedict.[2]

The abbey is named after St. Alban, who is the first recorded Christian martyr dating back to the third or fourth century.[3] Alban became well known for housing a Christian priest who was fleeing from persecutors in Roman Britain.[4] When the Prince ordered soldiers to search Alban’s house, Alban dressed as the priest to save the man whom he was protecting. This action, in addition to refusing to comply with pagan beliefs, ultimately led to Alban’s beheading, hence becoming a martyr in the Christian community.

The abbey remained relatively peaceful from its inception in 793 up until the Norman invasion of England in 1066. Duke William II of Normandy invaded England because he believed he had a claim to the English throne due to his familial relationship with the Anglo-Saxon King Edward the Confessor.[5] Ultimately, William was successful in his conquest and secured the English throne soon after the year 1072. This sudden rise to power had a range of socio-political, economic, social, and religious consequences for England. For example, and most notably, William replaced all Anglo-Saxon bishops, save Wulfstan of Dorchester, with Norman bishops.[6] In addition, he increased the number of church councils and created laws against simony and clerical marriage.[7] Furthermore, he replaced Anglo-Saxon abbots with Norman ones.[8] Combined, these actions enhanced the monastic life in England. For instance, the first Norman abbot arrived at the St. Albans monastery in 1077. While an abbot at St. Albans, he acquired new property for the monastery, helped to construct the new Romanesque abbey church, and established a scriptorium for the creation of manuscripts for the community’s use.[9] In this way, the Norman conquest indirectly enabled the St. Albans Psalter. In fact, much of the artwork in the psalter itself marks a departure from Anglo-Saxon artistic styles and instead represents the Romanesque style of art.

Romanesque style of art began around 1000 A.D. in Europe. Its primary modes of appearance were architectural sculpture, stained glass, manuscript illuminations, and wall paintings.[10] Despite occasional Anglo-Saxon features in its illumination cycle, the St. Albans Psalter is considered to be the paradigm of Romanesque-style artwork. The tightly controlled thick-bordered frames, the symmetry of some illuminations, the interdependent relationship between size and level of importance, and the curved forms of figures’ bodies are all characteristic of both the St. Albans Psalter and Romanesque-style artwork.

The psalter is believed to be commissioned by abbot Geoffrey of St. Albans and anchoress Christina of Markyate. According to The Life of Christina of Markyate, Christina and abbot Geoffrey were close, platonic friends. The relationship was also mutually beneficial, for "while [Geoffrey] busied himself in supplying the maiden’s needs, [Christina] strove to enrich the man in virtue" (68).[11] Christina would advise abbot Geoffrey on his ecclesiastical assignments and had even provided undergarments for him on his journey to Rome.[12] Their relationship broke away from the traditional one between a male cleric and an anchoress because she was in the role of an advisor. So much is their relationship a point of peculiarity that scholars have attempted to argue that Christina’s vita was commissioned by Geoffrey in order to elevate the status of St. Albans as a holy site and for Christina of Markyate.

Geoffrey entered the St. Albans community as a monk from France in restitution for borrowing vestments from St. Albans as props for a play he was producing.[13] During his time at St. Albans, he rose through the ranks and made new contributions to the liturgy. Christina of Markyate, on the other hand, was the daughter of a wealthy Anglo-Saxon family who attempted to force her into marriage by way of deceit, trickery and scandal. Hence, she lived a substantial portion of her life as a recluse and was even protected by a hermit for a brief time until she entered the community of St. Albans.[14] The historical considerations of abbot Geoffrey and anchoress Christina Markyate are important to address because, as previously mentioned, an on-going debate exists about whether or not the St. Albans Psalter was commissioned for Christina.

[1] "The Medieval Abbey." The Cathedral and Abbey Church of Saint Alban. Last Modified 2017. Accessed 9 December 2018. http://www.stalbancathedral.org/history/monastic-site.

[2] Ibid., "The Medieval Abbey."

[3] "Story of St. Alban." The Cathedral and Abbey Church of Saint Alban. Last Modified 2017. Accessed 9 December 2018. http://www.stalbancathedral.org/history/story-of-st-alban

[4] Ibid., "Story of St. Alban."

[5] "The Norman Invasion of England." Penfield Central School District. Accessed 9 December 2018. http://www.penfield.edu/webpages/jgiotto/onlinetextbook.cfm?subpage=1505054.

[6] "Norman Conquest." Encyclopædia Britannica. Last Modified 2018. Accessed 9 December 2018. http://www.britannica.com/event/Norman-Conquest.

[7] Ibid., "Norman Conquest."

[8] Ibid., "Norman Conquest."

[9] Kristen M. Collins, Nancy Turner, and Peter Kidd, The St. Albans Psalter Painting and Prayer in Medieval England (J. Paul Getty Museum, Los Angeles, 2013), 9.

[10] Conrad Rudolph, A Companion to Medieval Art: Romanesque and Gothic in Northern Europe, (New Jersey, Wiley-Blackwell, 2009), 106.

[11] Trans. C.H. Talbot, The Life of Christina of Markyate, (Oxford, Oxford University Press, 2010), 68.

[12] Ibid., The St. Albans Psalter Painting, 17.

[13] Ibid., The St. Albans Psalter Painting, 16.

[14] Ibid., The St. Albans Psalter Painting, 17.

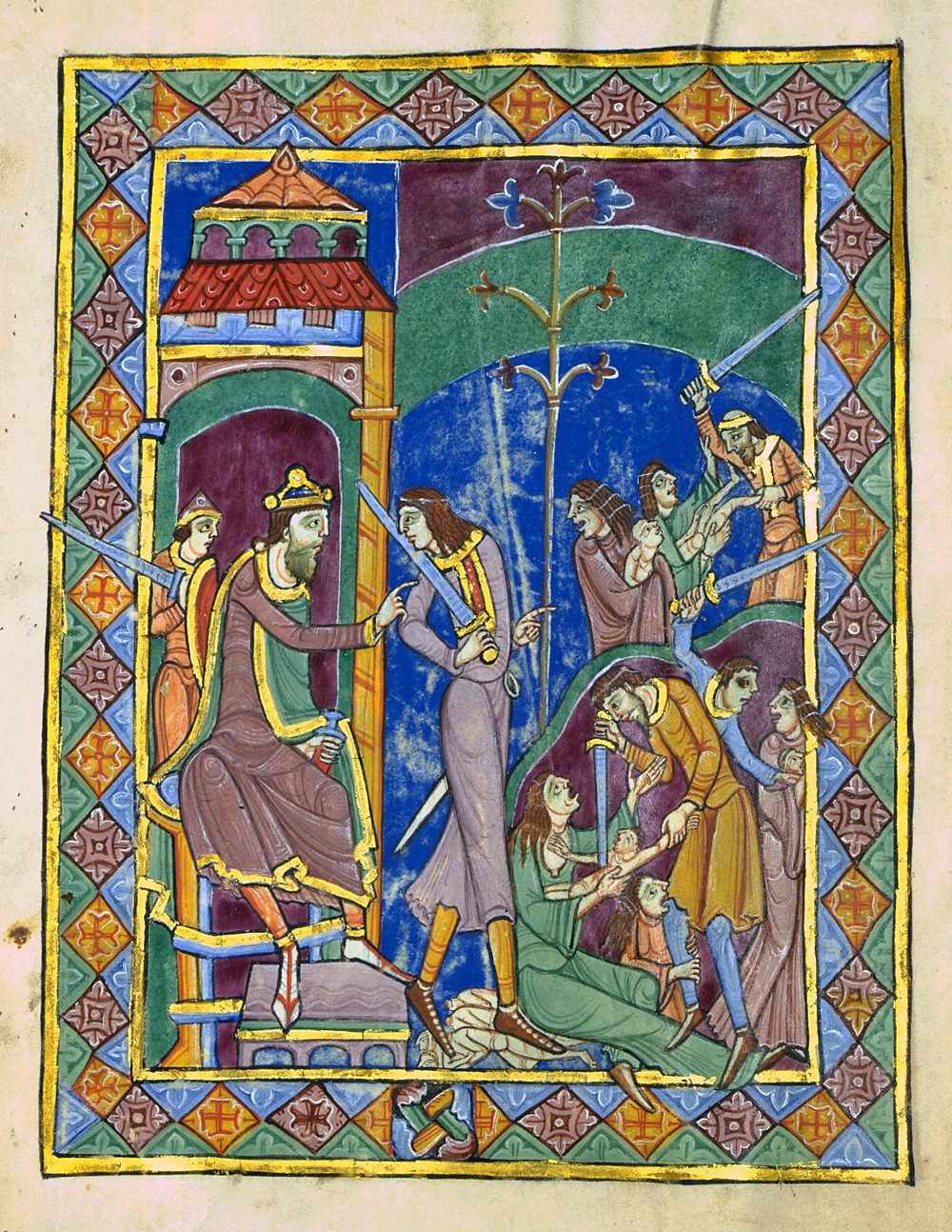
Massacre of the Innocents

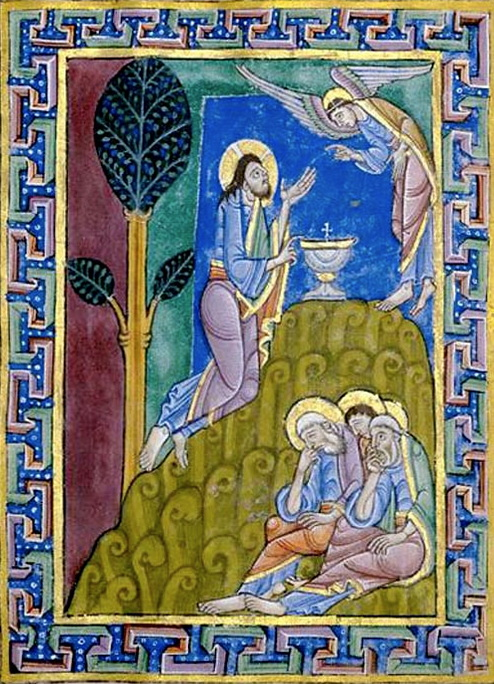
Jesus's Agony in the Garden

== Details of production ==
Within the accepted c.1120-c.1145 date-range, there is no firm scholarly consensus about the relative and absolute chronology of the creation of the five constituent parts. There are generally thought to be the work of at least six scribes and four artists in the volume, but there is disagreement about their identity, and who was responsible for what.

Published opinions until the 1960s were mostly that the manuscript was made before c.1125, or even before c.1123; this was modified in the 1980s to the decade c.1120-1130; while in the 1990s and 2000s several scholars have proposed dates in the 1130s. Attributions dating the manuscript to after 1145, or after 1155, have not gained general acceptance.

The main units of text are:

- The main part of the calendar and computistical material (pp. 2–15)
- Death anniversary of the hermit Roger, added to the calendar (12 September p. 11)
- Two further feasts, added to the calendar
- A large number of feasts and obiits, added to the calendar
- The outer bifolium of the first quire of the Psalms (pp. 73–74, 91-92)
- The rest of the Psalms, Litany, etc.
- The verse written on the pasted-in initial to Psalm 105 (p. 285)
- The rubrics added in or next to most historiated initials
- The texts of the quire containing the Chanson de St Alexis (pp. 57–72)

The last three listed are often said to have been written by the same scribe, identified by some as Abbot Geoffrey himself, giving a total of seven scribes. In addition, another 12th-century scribe corrected the text of the Psalms.

The main units of decoration are:

- The calendar, with Labours of the Months in roundels, and the signs of the zodiac
- The full-page fully painted prefatory miniatures containing the Life of Christ in thirty-seven miniatures, and one of St Martin, preceded by two of Adam and Eve, and followed by one of King David
- A 'diptych' of two full-page miniatures depicting the Martyrdom of St Alban, and King David with musicians
- The Alexis quire, including the Psalm 1 initial
- The pasted-in Psalm 105 initial
- All the other historiated initials

The prefatory miniatures are usually said to be by the artist of the Alexis quire, the so-called Alexis Master The majority of the historiated initials are usually said to have been painted by two artists, one of whom was the artist of the calendar and the final 'diptych'.

== Narrative cycle ==
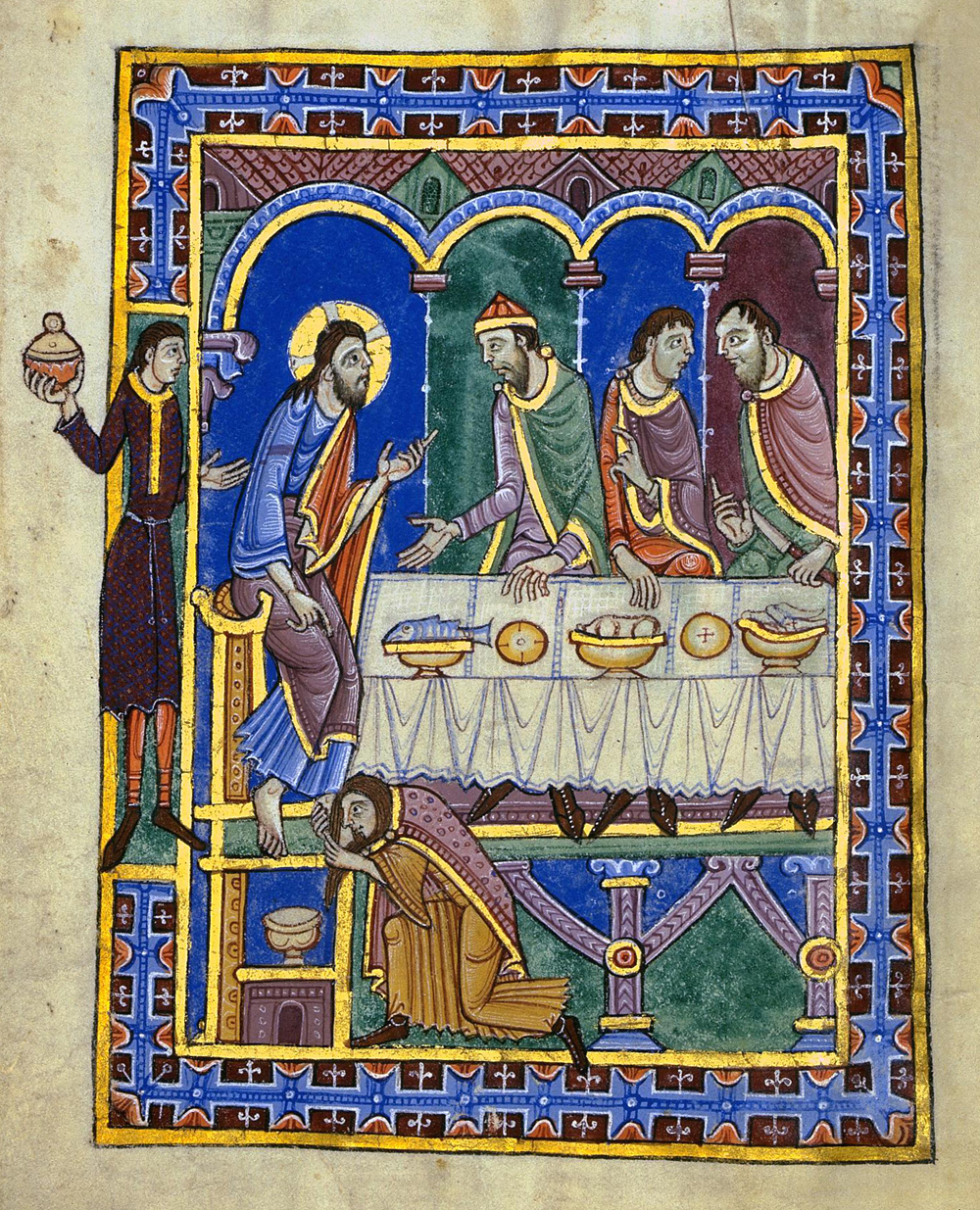
Christ in the house of Simon the Pharisee, with Mary Magdalen washing his feet, Luke 7:36-50

The scenes shown are:

- P17, Fall, Genesis 3:1-6
- P18, Expulsion, Genesis 4:21-24
- P19, Annunciation to Mary, Luke 1:28-35
- P20, Visitation, Luke 1:39-56
- P21, Nativity of Jesus in art, Luke 2:7
- P22, Annunciation to Shepherds, Luke 2:8-14
- P23, Magi before Herod, Matthew 2: 1-6
- P24, Journey of Magi, Matthew 2:9
- P25, Adoration of the Magi, Matthew 2:11
- P26, Dream of Magi Matthew 2:12
- P27, Return of Magi Matthew 2:12
- P28 Presentation of Jesus at Temple, Luke 2:22-28
- P29, Flight to Egypt, Matthew 2:14
- P30 Massacre of the Innocents, Matthew 2: 16-18
- P31, Return from Egypt, Matthew 2:20-21
- P32, Baptism of Christ, Luke 3:22; Matthew 3:13-17; Mark 1:9-11
- P33, Temptation of Christ: 1st Temptation, Luke 4:3-4; Matthew 4:3-4
- P34, 2nd Temptation, Luke 4:5-8; Matthew 4:5-7
- P35, 3rd Temptation, Luke 4:9-12; Matthew 4:8-12
- P36, Christ in the house of Simon the Pharisee, (Mary Magdalen washing feet), Luke 7:36-50
- P37, Entry to Jerusalem, John 12:13; Luke 19:35-36
- P38, Washing of feet, John 13:8-9
- P39, Agony in the Garden of Gethsemane, Christ with angel and chalice, Luke 22:39-45; Mark 14:32-34
- P40, Gethsemane, Christ and sleeping apostles, Mark 14:37-42
- P41, Last Supper, warning of Peter’s betrayal, sop to Judas, John 13:21-27
- P42, Betrayal of Christ, Matthew 26:47-52; Mark 14:43-48
- P43, Mocking, Mark 14:65; Luke 22:64; Mark 15:17-20; Matthew 27:28-29
- P44, Flagellation of Christ, John 19:1; Luke 23:16
- P45, Pontius Pilate washes hands, Matthew 27:24-25
- P46, Christ carrying the Cross, Matthew 27:31; John 19:17
- P47, Descent from the Cross, Matthew 27:57-59; Mark 15:43-46; Luke 23:50-53
- P48, Entombment of Christ, Matthew 27:30; Mark 15:46; Luke 23:53; John 19:38-40
- P49, Harrowing of Hell, Gospel of Nicodemus
- P50, Three Women at sepulchre, Matthew 28: 1-7; Mark 16: 1-7; Luke 24:1-10
- P51, Mary Magdalen announces resurrection to apostles, John 20:18; Mark 16:9-10
- P52, Christ appears to the Apostles, and Incredulity of Thomas, John 20:24-28. Luke 24:33-43; Mark 16:14
- P53, St Martin of Tours: dividing cloak and vision. Matthew 25:35 implied
- P54, Ascension, Acts 1:9-11
- P55, Pentecost, Acts 2:1-3
- P56, King David as Musician
- PP 69–71 Three scenes of the Supper at Emmaus, placed out of sequence.
