= Christine Fell =

Anglo-Saxon scholar

Professor Christine Elizabeth Fell OBE (1938 – 1998) taught English at the University of Nottingham from 1971 until 1993. She was especially noted for her contributions to women's history.

== Career ==
Fell was awarded a first-class honours degree in English from Royal Holloway, University of London, and later completed an MA in the Department of Scandinavian Studies at University College London. Professor Fell was Pro-Vice Chancellor of the University of Nottingham from 1986 to 1989, and Head of the English department from 1990 to 1993. She moved on to become the first Director of Humanities Research Centre in 1994, continuing until her retirement in 1997 due to ill health.

Her interests were in Old English vocabulary and semantics and she established Nottingham as a leading centre for Viking Studies. Her book Women in Anglo-Saxon England was an important publication in the history of medieval gender studies, and has been published in 31 different editions and formats.

She was appointed an OBE for her contribution to Early English Studies.

She died in 1998 and is commemorated by a trust fund set up in her name, and a sundial on the wall of Highfields House, inscribed in Old English in the manner of the dial from Kirkdale church, North Yorkshire.

Fell was honoured by a posthumous Festschrift in 2002 and, in 2007, a cluster of essays inspired by Fell's subjects and methods in the journal Nottingham Medieval Studies by the scholars Christina Lee, Jayne Carroll, Carole Hough, Anne L. Klinck, and Timothy Bolton.

== Publications ==
- Fell, Christine (1971). Edward, King and Martyr. Leeds: University of Leeds School of English. ISBN 978-0-902296-07-7.
- Fell, Christine (1978). "Edward King and Martyr and the Anglo-Saxon Hagiographic Tradition". In Hill, David (ed.). Ethelred the Unready. Oxford, UK: B.A.R. pp. 1–13. ISBN 978-0-86054-043-4.
- Fell, Christine (1987). Women in Anglo-Saxon England. Oxford, England: Blackwell US edition. There are 31 listed editions.
- Hough, Carole; Lowe, Kathryn A., eds. (2002). 'Lastworda Betst': Essays in Memory of Christine E. Fell with her Unpublished Writings. Donington: Shaun Tyas.
