= Markyate =

Village in Hertfordshire, England

Coordinates: 51°50′10″N 0°27′18″W

- Village and civil parish
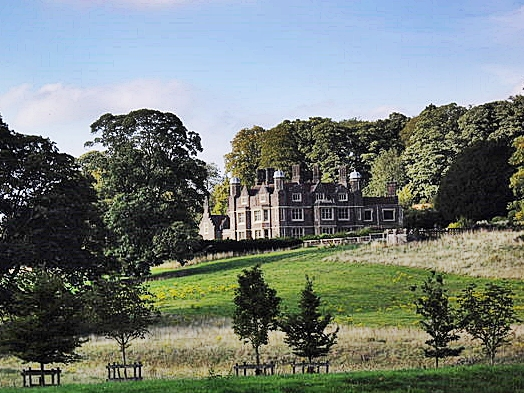
- Cell Park, Markyate

- Location within Hertfordshire
- Population: 3,415 (2021 Census)
- OS grid reference: TL065165
- Civil parish: Markyate
- District: Dacorum
- Shire county: Hertfordshire
- Region: East
- Country: England
- Sovereign state: United Kingdom
- Post town: ST ALBANS
- Postcode district: AL3
- Dialling code: 01582
- Police: Hertfordshire
- Fire: Hertfordshire
- Ambulance: East of England
- UK Parliament: Harpenden and Berkhamsted

Markyate (/ˈmɑːkjeɪt, ˈmɑːkieɪt/) is a village and civil parish in north-west Hertfordshire, close to the border with Bedfordshire and Buckinghamshire.

== Geography ==
The name of the village has had several former variants, including Markyate Street, Market Street and Mergyate. Markyate historically straddled Hertfordshire and Bedfordshire until boundary changes in 1897 placed it entirely in Hertfordshire. Markyate is close to the source of the River Ver, which has occasionally flooded the centre of the village, though the watercourse is often dry during parts of the year.

Markyate forms part of the borough of Dacorum (administered from Hemel Hempstead), but has Luton (01582) phone numbers and a St Albans postal code (AL3). Although historically a rural and agricultural area, it is now a dormitory village for Luton and the surrounding region, as it is a short distance from junction 9 of the M1 motorway.

The village lies near the junction of the A5183 Watling Street (formerly the A5 until de-trunking) and the B4540 (for Luton and Caddington). A bypass for the A5 was constructed to the east of the village in 1955.

== History ==
Markyate lies on the Roman road of Watling Street, approximately halfway between St Albans and Dunstable. Through the village Watling Street is called High Street.

A Benedictine nunnery was founded in 1145 in a wood just north of Markyate, which was known as both "Holy Trinity in the Wood" and Markyate Priory. The first prioress was Christina of Markyate. The priory was dissolved around 1537, following the Suppression of Religious Houses Act 1535. Shortly after the priory's dissolution a large country house was built on the site, called Markyate Cell, and now known as Cell Park.

Markyate's position on Watling Street made it a coaching stop on the stagecoach routes from London to Birmingham and Holyhead, especially after the road was upgraded by Thomas Telford in the early 1800s, when it became known as the Holyhead Road. At one point Markyate had over forty inns and public houses along the main road.

The village was one of the earliest sites of the Pickfords transport service. One road in the village is now called Pickford Road.

Growth since the 1950s has been by infilling with new housing in the gap between the High Street and the newer Markyate by-pass. In 2014 most of the village's light industry area off Hicks Road was demolished, to be replaced by new housing and shops.

== Governance ==
Markyate historically straddled three parishes and two counties. The southern part of the village (south of Buckwood Road and Hicks Road) was in the parish of Flamstead in Hertfordshire. The north-eastern part of the village (east of High Street and north of Hicks Road) was in the part of the parish of Caddington which was in Hertfordshire. The north-western part of the village (west of High Street and north of Buckwood Road) was in a detached part of the parish of Studham, known as Humbershoe. Humbershoe became a separate civil parish in 1866, although remained part of the ecclesiastical parish of Studham. When Poor Law Unions were established in 1835, the parish of Flamstead was included in the Hemel Hempstead Poor Law Union, whilst Caddington and Studham parishes were included in the Luton Poor Law Union, meaning that the poor from Markyate were sent to either Hemel Hempstead or Luton workhouses depending on where in the village they lived.

An ecclesiastical parish was created on 30 October 1877, called "St John Markyate Street", covering parts of the parishes of Caddington, Flamstead, Studham (Humbershoe) and an exclave of Houghton Regis known as Buckwood Stubbs, which was a rural area to the north-west of the village. A chapel dedicated to St John the Baptist had been built in 1734 on the edge of the Markyate Cell estate as a chapel of ease to Caddington, and it became the parish church of the new ecclesiastical parish.

Proposals to change the civil boundaries to match the ecclesiastical parish were put forward in 1888, but not implemented at that time. When district councils were established in December 1894 under the Local Government Act 1894, the ecclesiastical parish of Markyate found itself straddling three districts: Markyate Rural District, which despite the name only covered the parts of the village in the civil parish of Caddington, Hemel Hempstead Rural District covering the parts of the village in Flamstead, and Luton Rural District covering the parts of the village in Humbershoe and Houghton Regis civil parishes. This gave rise to confusion, with one candidate's nomination at the election in December 1894 being invalid for assuming that Humbershoe was in the Markyate district, when it was in the Luton district.

An inquiry was held at Luton in February 1896 into a proposal to create a civil parish to match the ecclesiastical parish of Markyate and make other changes to rationalise the border between Hertfordshire and Bedfordshire in this area. As an illustration of the absurdity of the existing arrangements in Markyate, it was said that dogs did not have to be muzzled on one side of the road, but they did on the other. There was general agreement that Markyate should be brought into a single parish and district, but some debate as to whether it should be placed in the Luton Rural District in Bedfordshire or the Hemel Hempstead Rural District in Hertfordshire. Eventually it was decided to place the new civil parish in Hemel Hempstead Rural District in Hertfordshire. The changes came into effect on 30 September 1897, with Markyate then being united as a single civil parish entirely in Hertfordshire.

The first meeting of Markyate Parish Council was held on 10 November 1897 in the village school. Frederick William Partridge, a Liberal, was elected the first chairman of the parish council. He had previously been the chairman of the Markyate Rural District Council.

The Hemel Hempstead Rural District was abolished under the Local Government Act 1972, and since 1 April 1974 the civil parish of Markyate has formed part of the district of Dacorum (which gained borough status in 1984).

== Facilities ==
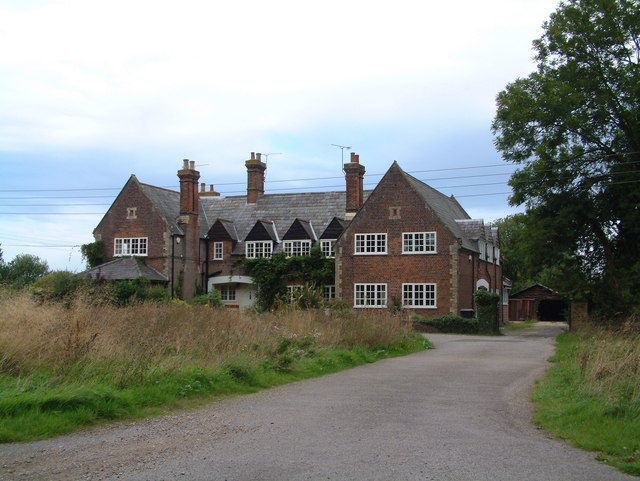
The Old School House, Cheverell's Green

Markyate has two junior schools: Markyate JMI (state) and Beechwood Park School (independent). The latter is south-west of the village in Beechwood Park, the site of a former Benedictine nunnery. Adjacent to the park was an Army Y-station during the Second World War. Beechwood Park lent its name to a song by the Zombies, written by the group's bassist Chris White. The song has since been covered by Beck in live shows.

The parish church of St John Markyate dates from the 18th century, and retains some round-arched windows from that time. Due to enlargement in the nineteenth century it now appears gothic from most directions. St John's is home to a worshipping community of the Church of England and is part of the united parish of Flamstead and Markyate.

From its height in the coaching era, only two public houses now remain in the village: the Plume of Feathers and the Swan. The White Hart closed in the early 1970s, followed by the Red Lion at the end of 2009 and Sun Inn in 2014, all of which became private dwellings.

Markyate has three Indian restaurants including Malaraj (on the A5183) plus Olive Naturally, and Markyate Spice all on the High Street, with the latter being named Best Chef at the Curry Life Awards 2018. There has also been a fish and chips shop in the village since the 1960s.

Markyate also offers a gym, a pharmacy and doctors' surgery, two general stores, and a bakers.

== Notable residents ==
- Christina of Markyate, a 12th-century nun and mystic
- William Cowper (1731-1800), poet and hymnwriter, who was sent to boarding school here between the ages of four and eight years old. He is best known for writing the lines God Moves in a Mysterious Way, His Wonders to Perform.
- Lady Katherine Ferrers, according to popular legend, the "Wicked Lady", a 17th-century highwaywoman.
- Nicholas Lyell, Baron Lyell of Markyate, British Conservative politician and Attorney General.
- Chris White, bass player and songwriter of the Zombies rock group, grew up in the village, where his parents owned a grocery store.
- Sir Charles Masefield, head of DESO (1994-1998) vice chairman of BAE (2002-2005?) and a trustee of the Qatar Foundation. Knighted in 1997 for services to industry.
- Martin Benson (10 August 1918 – 28 February 2010) was an English character actor, who appeared in films, theatre and television. He appeared in both British and Hollywood productions. He lived and died in the village.
- Andy King (14 August 1956 – 27 May 2015) an English professional footballer and manager. He was capped twice by England at Under-21 level and made a total of 195 appearances for Everton.
- Nathan Jones. Retired professional footballer and former manager of Luton Town
