= Geoffrey de Gorham =

Norman abbot

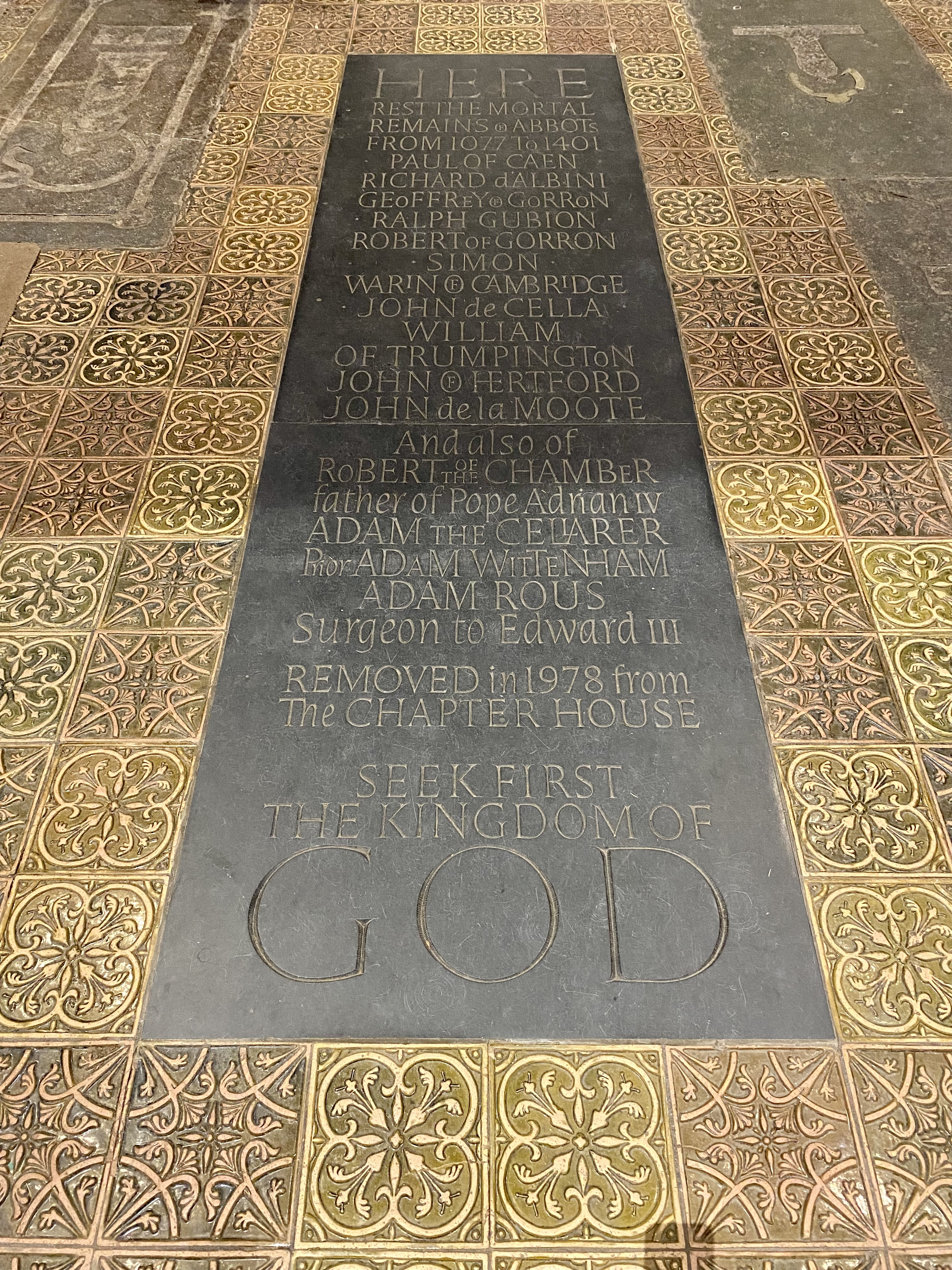
Stone marking the 1978 reburial of the remains of Geoffrey de Gorham and other Abbots of St Albans at St Albans Cathedral

Geoffrey de Gorham (Goreham, Gorron), sometimes called Geoffrey of Dunstable or of Le Mans (died at St Albans, 26 February 1146), was a Norman scholar who became Abbot of St Albans Abbey, 1119 to 1146.

== Life ==
Geoffrey, born in the province of Maine, then annexed to the Dukedom of Normandy, was from a noble family of Caen, Normandy. He was invited by Richard d'Aubeney, Abbot of St Albans, to become master of the Abbey school. On his arrival, he found that, owing to his journey being delayed, another had been appointed, whereupon he opened a school at Dunstable.

According to the Gesta Abbatum Monasterii Sancti Albani ("The Deeds of the Abbots of the Monastery of St Alban"), Geoffrey staged a miracle play on St. Katherine. A chronicle relates how he had borrowed some copes from St Albans Abbey for the performance, but had the misfortune to lose his books and the copes in a fire at his house in the night after the performance. To make up to God and the saint for the loss of the copes, he determined to become a monk of St Albans Abbey.

=== Abbot ===
Geoffrey became prior, and finally was elected abbot on the death of Richard, in 1119. He ruled for twenty-six years, and the abbey prospered. He built a fine guest hall and an infirmary with a chapel. Although he spent large sums on a new shrine of St Alban, he did not hesitate during a year of famine to remove the silver plates and use them to relieve the poor. He translated the body of the saint to the completed shrine on 2 August 1129. He also founded the hospital of St. Julian for lepers, on the London road.

During the wars of King Stephen's reign, Geoffrey melted down other silver and gave it to William of Ypres, and the Earl of Arundel, as ransom for the town of St. Albans, which they threatened to burn.

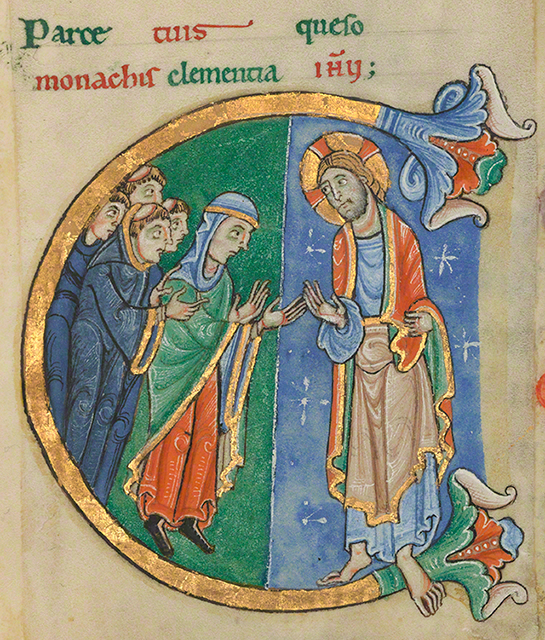
St. Albans Psalter

Geoffrey endowed the nunnery at Sopwell. Markyate Priory, in Hertfordshire, was founded in 1145, in a wood which was then part of the parish of Caddington, and belonged to the Dean and Chapter of St Paul's Cathedral, London. The house was built under the patronage of Geoffrey, for his friend, the recluse Christina of Markyate. It has been suggested by Janet Geddes and other scholars that Geoffrey's esteem for the prioress was such that he had a psalter made as a gift for her; and in celebration of their friendship had an illuminated "C" placed at the beginning of Psalm 105.

Geoffrey died at St Albans on 26 February 1146. His nephew Robert de Gorham became the eighteenth Abbot in 1151.
