= Women in Anglo-Saxon society =

Overview of the events of early medieval England

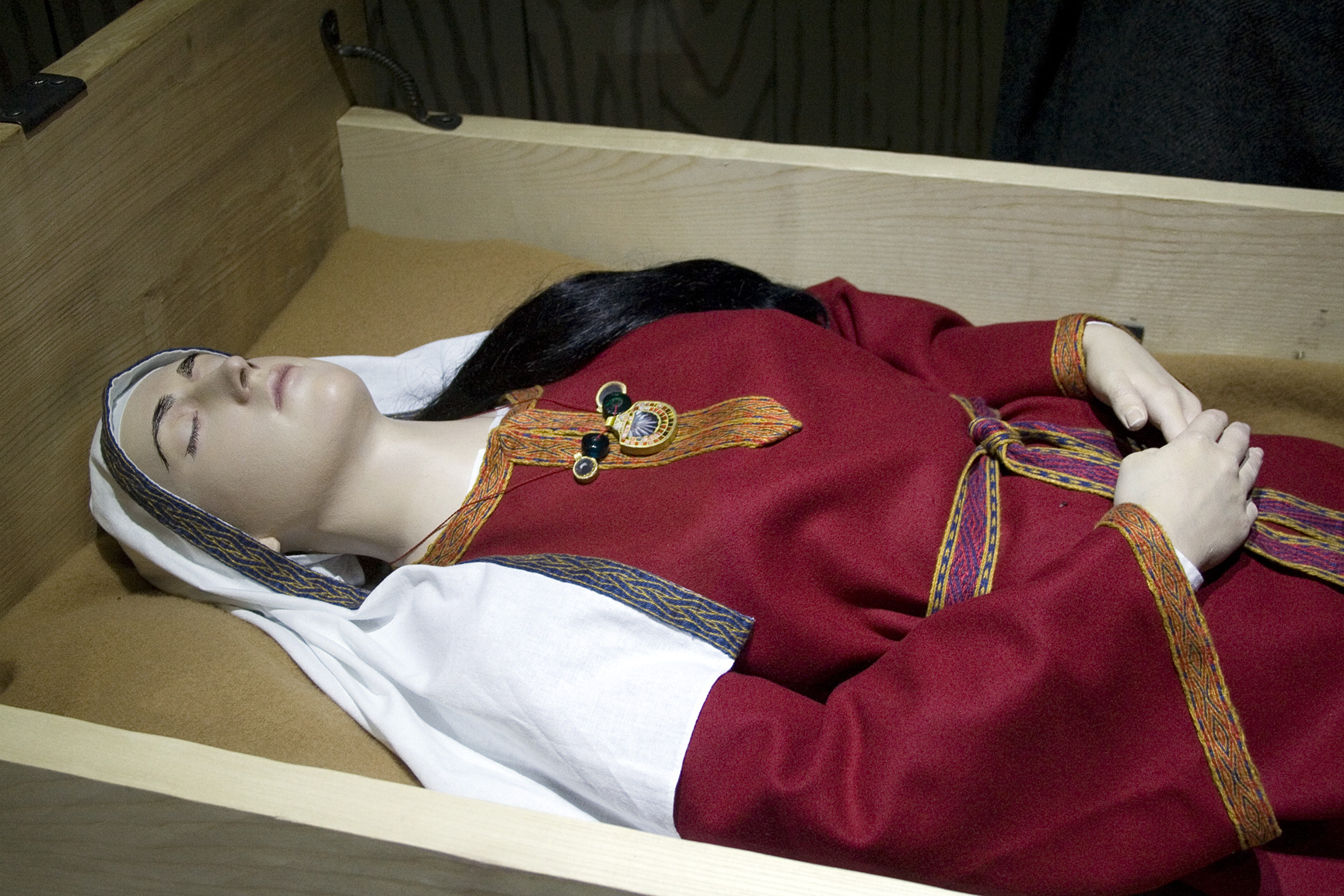
Saxon Princess Kirkleatham

The study of the role of women in the society of early medieval England, or Anglo-Saxon England, is a topic which includes literary, history and gender studies. Important figures in the history of studying early medieval women include Christine Fell, and Pauline Stafford.

The opportunities and influence that a woman had in early medieval England depended on her class status. Fell summarises that, in general, women were "near equal companions to the males in their lives, such as husbands and brothers, much more than in any other era before modern time". They could have private influence, and had a wide liberty of intervention in public affairs. Women led religious houses, an important example being the abbess Hilda of Whitby (referred to as Hild by Bede), and at the time such a position meant having significant political and cultural influence. Despite this sense of equality in some strata of society, dependent on class, some Anglo-Saxon women were still subject to slavery.

== Occupations ==
Women carried out a range of duties in a household, and when weather permitted, overall duties would include outdoor tasks. Historical evidence of said tasks women were involved with included farming, weeding and building structures. Records exist of women as cheese-makers, dairy-maids, and bakers. Female slaves were corn-grinders, serving maids, wet-nurses, weavers, and seamstresses. Common free women may have been found spinning as well as weaving. An important figure in poetry, especially the Beowulf poem, high status women are depicted serving drinks for company and family. Women of this time were also entertainers, comedians, and singers, and may have been employed by households or travelling groups.

== Christianity ==
In the early English Catholic church, women could be raised to sainthood, and this was most keenly observed immediately following the acceptance of Christianity. Christianity provided certain level of freedom for women and helped them rise to some of the most powerful positions in society. Within the church, women received relatively equal status despite there being evidence of anti-feminism found in homilies. Although anti-feminism was found in homilies, it did not always hold true in practice. Women who went into the convent and took vows of poverty, chastity and obedience were glorified in the eyes of the Church and its Fathers. The convent offered self-development and social responsibility to women.

The early Catholic church had institutions that consisted of male and female monasteries, located together but segregated. In these, the abbess assumed the headship of the institution. Convents were run by abbesses, this is evidence that women held positions of visibility and significance. They were responsible for the finances and management of property, with help from some of the resident nuns. This level of authority did not survive the Viking invasion of 789, although women continued to play important roles in the church in late Anglo-Saxon England. In nunneries, women would undertake duties across the household, including raising animals, working in the gardens, making textiles, and scribing.

Although there were some equal opportunities for men and women in the Christian Church in Anglo-Saxon England, scholars including Fell and Pasternack suggest that it is still important to look at the role of the "Patriarchs of the Bible." Outside monastic orders, the Church's positions of authority were all held by men, and men granted women the opportunities and status that they had. Furthermore, churches in Anglo-Saxon England stressed doctrines that preached about virginity as a virtue and faithful monogamy; this is believed to have limited some people's chances of acquiring political power and property.

== Queens and rulers ==
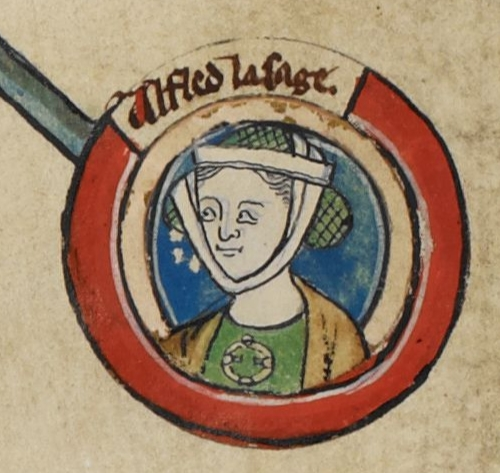
Medieval miniature of Æthelflæd in Genealogical roll of the kings of England. British Library MS Royal 14 B VI

Women could hold positions of highest power in politics. In the sixth century, the Christian Frankish princess Bertha of Kent was instrumental to the establishment of Christianity in the region. Her marriage to King Æthelberht of Kent, and therefore introduction of Christianity to the king, has been posited as the reason why the Roman missionary Augustine was permitted to establish an episcopal see at Canterbury.

In his Ecclesiastical History of the English People, Bede records that the wife of Rædwald, leader of the East Angles in the seventh century who was possibly buried in Mound 1 at Sutton Hoo, played a role in keeping pagan belief at court, and her influence may be evident in the pagan symbol items in the burial. Other burials at Sutton Hoo, including the Mound 14 timber-lined burial chamber, provide material evidence of high-status women.

In the late eighth century, the kingdom of Mercia saw the issue of coins bearing the likeness of Cynethryth, the wife of King Offa of Mercia. She is the only Anglo-Saxon queen consort in whose name coinage was definitely issued.

In the tenth century, Æthelflæd was the 'effective ruler of Mercia' even before the death of her husband Æthelred, and also was founder of Gloucester Abbey. Upon her death, she was succeeded by her daughter and only child Ælfwynn. Although her reign was short, Aelfwynn's accession was the only example of rule passing from one woman to another in the early medieval period in the British Isles.

Emma of Normandy, who married first Æthelred the Unready and then Cnut, and was the mother of Harthacnut and Edward the Confessor, was 'a major force in the turbulent politics of 11th-century England'.

== Laws ==
The written law only represents a portion of the laws that impacted the lives of women; therefore they only reflect partial views of what actually happened. Women were considered to be members of the state and their rights were protected, regardless of their status as maidens, widows or wives. Women were classed as oath worthy and could appear as grantors, grantees and witnesses of charters. Women were held responsible and accountable under the law for their activity, although were not held accountable for any criminal activity that her husband did, unless she was a willing accessory to the crime. Along with being law abiding, they received appropriate compensation for crimes that were committed against them, and the compensation was paid directly to them.

=== Marriage and divorce ===
In Anglo-Saxon England, there were many laws related to marriage. Fell examined some inconsistencies in Anglo-Saxon laws, for example, some laws ensured that women (whether unmarried or widows) were not forced to marry a man that she disliked; however, Aethelberht's law stated that a man is legally allowed to steal another man's wife as long as he pays him reparation. Æthelraed's 1008 code states that widows shall remain unmarried for 12 months after the death of her husband, at which point they have the freedom to choose.

Once married, a woman was to situate herself as the object of her husband's subjectivity, she was to become the object of his protection and the property, although she still remained the owner of her property. The Church held that married women had no authority and were to stand under the lordship of men. Therefore, under the church they were not able to teach, witness, take an oath, nor be a judge.

In marriage, a man often developed his sphere of influence through his wife. Although women were seen as such under the church, there were laws that protected them in the public sphere when married. Divorce was rare, and the only documented ones were in cases of adultery. A woman who committed adultery by sleeping with a man who was not her husband while her husband was still alive was subject to give what she owned to her husband.

A prospective husband had to offer his wife a valuable gift called the morgengifu, a "morning-gift," which consisted of paying money or giving land for the ladies' hand in marriage. This was paid to her directly and she had the right to do with it as she pleased. It is made clear that the marriage finances were held by both man and woman. A woman was free to leave a marriage, keeping in mind the only times divorce was documented was in cases of adultery; and if the woman did leave and take the children, she was entitled to half the property. These gifts were substantial sums and generally property. The gifts given by the groom were sometimes viewed as a sale of the bride, when, in actuality, it was to safeguard her interests and add security.

=== Sexual assault ===
Records exist of women engaged in sex work or prostitution, although it is not clearly stated whether the women consented to the act or not: one law states that a woman belonging to the King she would have cost roughly 30 shillings, while a commoner only 6 shillings. The fact that rape of a slave was more expensive than seduction of a free woman shows that although all rape was viewed negatively in society, a woman's status was relative to a man.

Laws of Ælfred go into great detail regarding laws about sexual assaults. An example of the law committed by a man was King Æthebald of Mercia who was punished for numerous reasons, including violating holy nuns who were virgins consecrated to God. When compensation was paid a free woman, ceorl or ranked above, she collected the money directly, and the money for slaves went to their owner. It is also unclear whether the wife or husband received the money for their servants. Rape as a topic is important because it relates to gender relations, class status, property rights, judicial customs, female agency, religious virtues of integrity of the body and representation of all of these in a society. Sexual assaults were greatly penalized whether it was a slave or free woman. Burials suggest that a raped body was unceremonious. A few documents suggest that some men of this era applauded other men who beat their wives and that some men even thought that a wife should be beaten regularly; this may have been condoned by clergy. Even though there were laws protecting women that had been raped, sometimes the acts went unpunished for lack of information or time. The victim herself may not have told anyone until many years after, or no one really took an interest in the crime if the victim was of the serving class.

Sex and rape were also discussed in Anglo-Saxon literature. There are executed and threatened acts of violent sexual assaults mentioned in some literature and legal texts; an example is the homily of Wulfstan, a text in which he wrote about women being raped at the hands of the Vikings.

=== Wills ===
Women had property rights and many landowners were women. They were able to bequeath land, as shown in numerous wills. Leaving property by means of a will was not restricted to kin; it could also be left to servants, religious figures, and churches. Documents of wills and charters show that women owned estates, by virtue of grant, will, or inheritance, and that they were seen roughly equal in the common life of the countryside. Evidence in these documents shows no preference to daughters or sons as heirs. Ceorl women and others of high rank were responsible for their homes. Some of the items that women would commonly receive via trust or inheritance were real property estates, slaves, livestock, household furnishings, clothing, jewels, and books. Items such as table clothes, bed sheets, and wall hangings were considered women's property because women made them.

== Health and medicine ==
Anglo-Saxons had warnings for pregnant women, including avoiding foods that were too salty or sweet, pork, and other fatty foods. They were also told to abstain from strong alcohol and too much drink and to avoid travel on horseback. If a woman were to stop menstruating supposedly due to a lack of nutrients and was not pregnant, she was to take hot baths, drink hot herb teas, and dress warmly.

== See also ==
- List of Wessex consorts

== Sources ==
- Blair, John (1984). The Anglo-Saxon Age: A Very Short Introduction. New York: Oxford University Press.
- Clarkson, Tim (2018). Æthelflæd: The Lady of the Mercians. Edinburgh: John Donald. ISBN 978 1 910900 16 1.
- Fell, Christine (1984). Women in Anglo-Saxon England. Oxford, England: Blackwell.
- Fell, Christine (1987). Women in Anglo-Saxon England (US ed.). Oxford, England: Blackwell.
- Hadley, Dawn (2004). "Negotiating gender, family and status in Anglo-Saxon burial practices, c600-950". In Brubaker, Leslie; Smith, Julia M.H. (eds.). Gender in the Early Medieval World: East and West, 300-900 AD. New York: Cambridge University Press. pp. 301–323.
- Horner, Shari (2004). Carol Pasternack; Lisa M.C. Weston (eds.). "The Languages of Rape in Old English Literature and Law: Views from the Anglo-Saxon(ist)s". Sex and Sexuality in Anglo-Saxon England. Tempe, Arizona: Board of Regents for Arizona State University: 149–181.
- Hough, Carol (1999a). "Marriage and Divorce". In Lapidge; et al. (eds.). The Blackwell Encyclopedia of Anglo-Saxon England. pp. 302–303.
- Hough, Carol (1999b). "Women". In Lapidge; et al. (eds.). The Blackwell Encyclopedia of Anglo-Saxon England. pp. 485–487.
- Ide, Arther Frederick (1983). Special Sisters: Women in the European Middle Ages. Mesquite, TX: Ide House.
- Jewell, Helen (1996). "The Background: women in England before 1100". Women in Medieval England. New York: Manchester University Press: 26–52.
- Pasternack, Carol Braun (2003). Sharon Farmer and Carol Braun Pasternack (ed.). "Negotiating Gender in Anglo-Saxon England". Gender and Difference in the Middle Ages. Minneapolis: U. of Minnesota Press: 107–142.
- Richards, Mary P.; Stanfield, B. Jane (1990). Damico and Olsen (ed.). "Concepts of Anglo-Saxon Women in the Laws". New Reading on Women in Old. Indiana: Indiana University Press: 89–99.
- Stenton, Frank M. (1990). Damico and Olsen (ed.). "The Historical Bearing of Place-Name Studies: The Place of Women in Anglo-Saxon Society". New Reading on Women in Old. Indiana: Indiana University Press: 79–88.
