= Henry of Huntingdon =

English historian (c. 1088 – c. 1157)

Henry of Huntingdon (Latin: Henricus Huntindoniensis; c. 1088 – c. 1157), the son of a canon in the diocese of Lincoln, was a 12th-century English historian and the author of Historia Anglorum (Medieval Latin for "History of the English"), as "the most important Anglo-Norman historian to emerge from the secular clergy". He served as archdeacon of Huntingdon. The few details of Henry's life that are known originated from his own works and from a number of official records. He was brought up in the wealthy court of Robert Bloet of Lincoln, who became his patron.

At the request of Bloet's successor, Alexander of Lincoln, Henry began to write his Historia Anglorum, first published around 1129, an account of the history of England from its beginnings up to the year 1154.

== Life ==
Henry was born in about 1088 and died about 1157. He succeeded his father Nicholas as archdeacon of the Diocese of Lincoln in 1110. No personal correspondence or anecdotes survived him and it seemed that no one considered him important enough to have written a memorial. His biography depends upon a few notices scattered through his own work and in a few places where he left his name in the course of his official duties. Though the identity of his mother is unknown, she was probably English, as Henry was an English native speaker. His father Nicholas, the first archdeacon of Huntingdon, was a clerk in holy orders, who had enough influence with the Bishop of Lincoln to secure the succession of his title for his son, a substantial inheritance for a man who had not yet reached thirty. Nicholas was canon of Lincoln for over thirty years until his death in 1110.

Henry was received as a little boy into the familia of Robert Bloet of Lincoln and grew up in luxury, living in the wealth and splendour of England's richest episcopal court. His upbringing gave him a positive outlook towards the world, but in later years he learned to feel a certain recoil of distrust or contemptus mundi, "contempt for the world", a feeling which encompasses much of his mature literary work. Bishop Bloet's successor, Alexander of Lincoln, became sensible of Henry's aptitude for business and employed him frequently for important affairs, though it remains clear that Henry owed his promotion to the patronage of Bishop Bloet. It was at Bishop Alexander's request that Henry began to write his Historia Anglorum ('The History of The English'). The formal Prologue of his History, which was addressed to Bishop Alexander, was written in a floridly dense high style that allowed him to parade himself, before retreating into dutiful obscurity behind the chroniclers he had used. It was written as an elaborate defence of the writing of history and to show off his degree of education.

Over the years, Henry's contempt for the world grew and became the informing spirit of his literary work and spiritual life. During his travels, he began to notice that people were more worried about taking care of their belongings than of themselves. This led him to write a long poem on De contemptu visibilum.

Like his father, Henry was a married priest, though the identity of his wife is unknown. They had at least one child, a son named Adam, who became a clerk. The family lived in the village of Little Stukeley in Huntingdonshire.

Overall, the little-known information about Henry is concrete and suggestive, hinting at a life lived just below the first ranks of property and talent in an age of personal reticence. He mentions Lanfranc as having been "famous in our own time", which places Henry's birthdate a few years before 1089, the year Lanfranc died. His Historia Anglorum leaves off in 1154, with the promise of another book for the new reign; however, since that book was never written it may be assumed that Henry died shortly afterward.

== Writings ==
=== Historia Anglorum ===
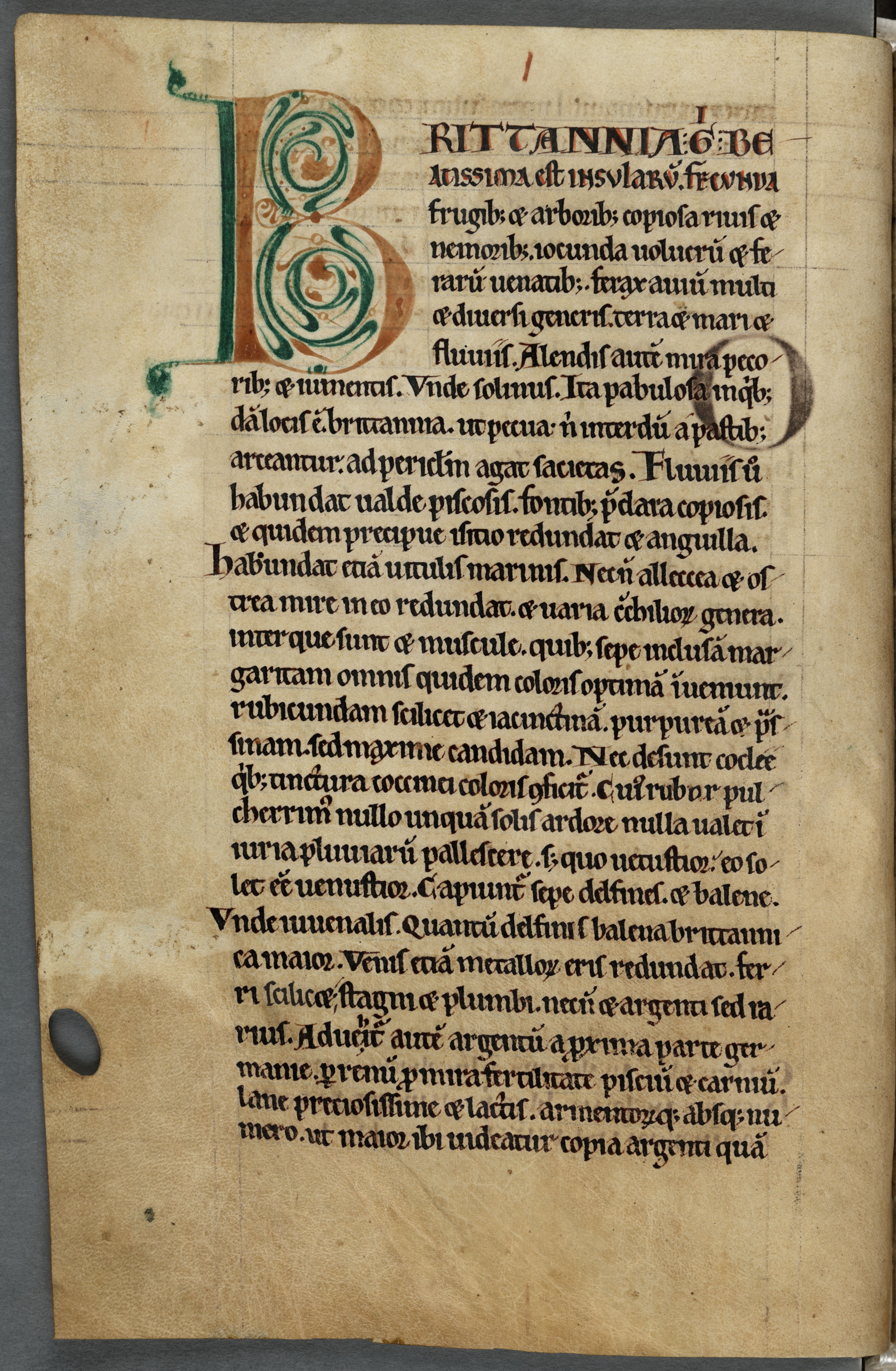
The opening page from Book 1 of the Historia Anglorum.

Henry's most notable work is the Historia Anglorum. He was bidden by Bishop Alexander of Lincoln to write a history of England from the earliest period and bringing it to modern times, ending it upon the accession of Henry II in 1154. It was assumed that the first edition was published at the end of 1129 and the second in 1135, at the end of the reign of Henry I of England. He published new editions as the years went on, the final fifth copy coming down in 1154, supposedly to terminate the History with the death of Stephen, leaving his history organised into eight books. There is some evidence that Henry did not intend to stop there, intending to add another book to his series that would cover the events of the first five years of the reign of Henry II. It was never carried out, as Henry of Huntingdon must have been at least seventy years old by the time of the king's accession and died shortly afterwards.

Henry's ear for telling detail is responsible for entertaining touches drawn from current legend and his own fertile imagination. C. Warren Hollister notes the anecdote of King Canute's failure to stem the tide by command (see below), and Henry I's ignoring his physician's orders and dining on a "surfeit of lampreys", allegedly causing his death. Such touches rendered his history popular – there are twenty-five surviving manuscripts – and they embedded his anecdotes firmly into popular history. However, as the bishop's household was with the royal court frequently, it is possible that Henry was an eyewitness for many of the anecdotes he describes. Diana Greenway points out that the details he provides about the royal family are remarkably accurate.

Historia Anglorum was first printed by Sir Henry Savile in 1596 in the historical miscellany Rerum Anglicarum Scriptores post Bedam praecipui.

Henry's sources included:

- Bede, Historia Ecclesiastica, for the years up to 731.
- Historia Brittonum (Vatican recension).
- Paul the Deacon's Historia Romana, for Roman emperors, as well as Eutropius and Aurelius Victor
- The works of Saint Jerome and Gregory the Great, with which Henry had a passing familiarity.
- Saints' Lives (especially Book 9).
- Versions of the Anglo-Saxon Chronicle similar to C and E. This included the poem on Brunanburh, which he translated into Latin.
- A lost version of the Anglo-Saxon Chronicle, which he shared with John of Worcester. This version contained quite a number of detailed and valuable accounts of battles of the Saxon invasions of Britain which are only preserved in Henry's Historia.
- Peter Tudebode's Historia de Hierosolymitano itinere.
- Old English poems, which he translated into Latin. This may include the legend of King Canute and the tide, as well as material on Siward, Earl of Northumbria.
- Old French songs, for Norman history.

==== Manuscripts ====
According to Arnold (1879), some 12 manuscripts preserve the Historia Anglorum

- Corpus Christi College ms 280 – 12th cent.
- Savile – 12th cent.
- BNdF 6042 – 12th cent.
- Peniarth MS 382 – 1196
- Bibliothèques de Rouen – 13th cent.
- Arundel 48 – 13th cent.
- Lambeth 118 – 13th cent.
- Lambeth 327 – 13th cent.
- Grosvenor – 13th cent.
- Advocates Library A 5 38 – 13th cent.
- Advocates Library 33 5 4 – 13th cent.
- Cambridge University Library G. g. II 21 – 13th cent.

==== Editions ====
- Greenway, Diana, ed. (2019) [1996]. Henry, Archdeacon of Huntingdon: Historia Anglorum: The History of the English People. Oxford Medieval Texts. Translated by Greenway, Diana (online ed.). Oxford University Press. doi:10.1093/actrade/9780198222248.book.1.

=== Other works ===
As an author, Henry distinguished himself in his youth by writing poetry, comprising eight books of epigrams, eight books on love, and the so-called Anglicanus ortus, eight books on herbs, spices and gems united by a medical theme. Of these, two books of epigrams and the eight medical books survive, the latter identified only in modern times. The Anglicanus ortus has since been published, books 1–6 (on herbs and spices) as Anglicanus ortus: a Verse Herbal of the Twelfth Century (Toronto, Pontifical Institute of Mediaeval Studies, c2012), and books 7–8 (on gems) as "Henry of Huntingdon's lapidary rediscovered and his Anglicanus ortus reassembled" (Mediaeval Studies, v. 68, 2006, pp. 43–87), both edited by Winston Black. Henry wrote an Epistle to Henry I on the Succession of foreign kings and emperors up to their own time, and another to a man named Warin that contained an account of the ancient British kings from Brute to Cadwaller. The information for this account was obtained from a monk while Henry was at the Abbey of Bec, which held the writings of Geoffrey of Monmouth.

Henry's most notable epistle was a funereal exercise addressed to his recently deceased friend and fellow archdeacon of Lincoln diocese, Walter of Leicester, titled De contemptu mundi ("On Contempt for the world"), which from internal evidence dates to 1135.

== Contribution to history ==
The contribution that Henry of Huntingdon brought to history cannot solely rest with his Historia Anglorum but must also include his Epistles. All of these writings offer an insight into the minds of those who lived in the twelfth century and illuminate how historians of the time recorded history and corresponded with their peers. Henry's legacy consisted of his own contribution to the history of England and his recorded thoughts and ideas, thereby opening a valuable perspective on his era's mindset. Like many medieval writers, Henry saw the chief purpose of history as a moral lesson to teach people of both higher and lower ranks of society with instructive examples. In his prologue, he hopes that his readers will become better people from reading his History.

== Manuscripts ==
After Arnold (1879):

1. Corpus Christi College, Cambridge 280 (12th century)
2. Savile (12th century)
3. Bibl. Nat. Paris 6042 (12th century)
4. Hengwrt 101 (A.D.1196)
5. Bibl. Pub. Rouen (12th-13th cent.)
6. BL Arundel MS 48 (12th-13th cent.)

Arnold lists a total of 33 manuscript sources.
