= Bussey (surname) =

Bussey is a surname. Notable people with the surname include:

- Andrew Bussey (born 1979), American Olympic sprint canoeist
- Barney Bussey (born 1962), American football player
- Ben Bussey, 21st-century American planetary scientist
- Benjamin Bussey (1757–1842), merchant, farmer, horticulturalist and patriot from Boston, US
- Bill Bussey (born 1964), co-host of the Rick and Bubba comedy radio show
- Carl Bussey (born 1978), American soccer midfielder
- Charles M. Bussey (1921–2003), American soldier
- Cora Bussey Hillis (1858–1924), American child welfare advocate
- Cyrus Bussey (1833–1915), American soldier and politician
- Dave Bussey (born 1952), British radio DJ
- Davina Bussey (born 1965), American R&B singer known mononymously as "Davina"
- Dexter Bussey (born 1952), American football player
- Ed Bussey, 21st-century British technology entrepreneur
- Ernest Bussey (1891–1958), British trad union leader
- Gertrude C. Bussey (1888–1961), American philosopher and women's rights activist
- George Bussey (born 1984), American football player
- George Gibson Bussey (1829–1889), English inventor
- Hannah Bussey (1840–1922), English vegetarianism activist
- Jack Bussey (born 1992), English rugby league footballer
- John Bussey (1895–1979), British Directorate of Overseas Surveys
- Lionel Bussey (1883–1969), British engineer and collector of women's shoes
- Nate Bussey (born 1989), American professional football linebacker
- Terry Bussey (born 2006), American football player
- Tre Bussey (born 1991), American professional basketball player
- Tyler Bussey, American guitarist and vocalist for The World Is a Beautiful Place & I Am No Longer Afraid to Die
- Walter Bussey (1904–1982), English footballer
- Young Bussey (1917–1945), American football player

== Disambiguation pages ==
- Senator Bussey (disambiguation)
- Thomas Bussey (disambiguation)

== See also ==
- Bussy (surname)
- De Bussy
