= De Bussy =

De Bussy is a surname. Notable people with the name include:

- Roger de Bussy, a medieval Anglo-Norman nobleman during the reigns of King Stephen of England and King Henry II of England
- Louis de Clermont, seigneur de Bussy (1549–1579), a gentleman at the court of French king Henri III
- Roger de Rabutin, comte de Bussy (1618–1693), a French memoirist commonly known as Bussy-Rabutin
- Marquis de Bussy-Castelnau (1718–1785), the Governor General of the French colony of Pondicherry from 1783 to 1785
- David Victor Belly de Bussy (1768–1848), A French general who fought in the Napoleonic Wars. Referred to as "M. de Bussy" in some histories of the Waterloo Campaign

== See also ==
- Bussy (surname)
- Bussey (surname)
- Debussy (disambiguation)
