= Frances Degen Horowitz =

American developmental psychologist (1932–2021)

- Born: May 5, 1932; New York City, New York
- Died: March 15, 2021 (aged 88); New York City, New York
- Education: Antioch College; Goucher College; University of Iowa
- Spouse: Floyd R. Horowitz (m. 1953–2014)
- Children: 2
- Awards: Center for Advanced Study in the Behavioral Sciences fellowship (1983–4)
- Scientific career
- Fields: Developmental psychology
- Institutions: University of Kansas; Graduate Center of the City University of New York
- Thesis: The Incentive Value of Social Stimuli for Preschool Children (1959)

Frances Degen Horowitz (May 5, 1932 – March 15, 2021) was an American developmental psychologist who served as President of the Graduate Center, City University of New York from 1991 to 2005. She was instrumental in raising the stature of the institution and moving it to its current location in the B. Altman and Company Building on Fifth Avenue of New York City.

Horowitz served as president of the American Psychological Association (APA) Division 7 (Developmental Psychology) from 1977 to 1978. She served as president of the American Psychological Foundation from 1991 to 1994 and as president of the Society for Research in Child Development from 1997 to 1999.

Horowitz was known for her research and teaching around the world, particularly in infant behavior and development. She authored more than 120 articles, chapters, monographs, and books on the subjects of infant development, early childhood development, high-risk infants, the gifted, and theories of development.

== Biography ==
Frances Degen met her future husband, Floyd Ross Horowitz, when she was 11 years old. They married in 1953 and had two sons together.

She completed a bachelor's degree in philosophy at Antioch College in 1954. She obtained a master's degree in elementary education at Goucher College, also in 1954. After working as a public school teacher in Iowa City, she returned to school to pursue a doctorate in developmental psychology, graduating from the University of Iowa in 1959. She completed her dissertation, titled The incentive value of social stimuli for preschool children, under the supervision of Boyd R. McCandless at the Iowa Child Welfare Research Station.

She was an assistant professor at Southern Oregon College from 1959 to 1961 before joining the faculty of the University of Kansas. She served as Founder and Chair of the Department of Human Development and Family Life from 1968 to 1978, and as Vice Chancellor for Research, Graduate Studies and Public Service at the University of Kansas from 1978 to 1991.

== Honors and awards ==
Horowitz was a member of Sigma Xi, as well as a fellow of both the American Psychological Association and the Association for Psychological Science. She held a fellowship at the Center for Advanced Study in the Behavioral Sciences from 1983 to 1984. She was elected a fellow of the American Association for Advancement of Science in 1994, the New York Academy of Sciences in 2000, and a member of the American Academy of Arts and Sciences in 2004. She was named Chair of the Antioch College Board of Trustees in 2012.

Horowitz received the Outstanding Educator of America Award in 1973. She was awarded the Distinguished Psychologist in Management Award from the Society of Psychologists in Leadership in 1993. She was named an Alumni Fellow of the University of Iowa in 2005.

== Books ==
- Horowitz, F. D. (1975). Visual attention, auditory stimulation, and language discrimination in young infants. University of Chicago Press.
- Horowitz, F. D. (Ed.) (1978). Early developmental hazards: Predictors and precautions. Routledge.
- Horowitz, F. D. (1987). Exploring developmental theories: Toward a structural/behavioral model of development. Psychology Press.
- Horowitz, F. D., Subotnik, R. F., & Matthews, D. J. (Eds.). (2009). The development of giftedness and talent across the life span. American Psychological Association.

== Representative papers ==
- Colombo, John; Horowitz, Frances Degen (1987). "Behavioral State as a Lead Variable in Neonatal Research". Merrill-Palmer Quarterly. 33 (4): 423–437. JSTOR 23086402.
- Horowitz, Frances Degen (1974). "Infant Attention and Discrimination: Methodological and Substantive Issues". Monographs of the Society for Research in Child Development. 39 (5/6): 1–15. doi:10.2307/1165968. JSTOR 1165968. PMID 4464449.
- Horowitz, Frances Degen (October 1987). "A Developmental View of Giftedness". Gifted Child Quarterly. 31 (4): 165–168. doi:10.1177/001698628703100407. S2CID 146676917.
- Horowitz, Frances Degen (1 September 1989). "Using developmental theory to guide the search for the effects of biological risk factors on the development of children". The American Journal of Clinical Nutrition. 50 (3): 589–597. doi:10.1093/ajcn/50.3.589. PMID 2672777.
- Horowitz, Frances Degen (2000). "Child Development and the PITS: Simple Questions, Complex Answers, and Developmental Theory". Child Development. 71 (1): 1–10. doi:10.1111/1467-8624.00112. JSTOR 1132211. PMID 10836552.
- Nelson, Charles A.; Horowitz, Frances Degen (1983). "The Perception of Facial Expressions and Stimulus Motion by Two- and Five-Month-Old Infants Using Holographic Stimuli". Child Development. 54 (4): 868–877. doi:10.2307/1129891. JSTOR 1129891. PMID 6617308.
