= Bird Thomas Baldwin =

American psychologist (1875–1928)

Bird Thomas Baldwin (May 31, 1875 – May 11, 1928) was an American educator, psychologist, and researcher of child development. He was the director of the Iowa Child Welfare Research Station. As part of the United States Army, he was a psychologist for wounded soldiers.

== Personal life and early career ==
Baldwin was born on May 31, 1875, in Marshallton, Chester County, Pennsylvania. He received a BS degree at Swarthmore College in 1900, later becoming the principal of Moorestown Friends School in Moorestown, New Jersey, for two years. While continuing his education at Harvard University, where he received his AM and PhD for psychology and education, he was employed by the University of Pennsylvania. He was a psychology student at Leipzig University in 1906. Baldwin taught at Westchester State Normal School, the University of Texas, and Swarthmore College.

== Research and child development ==
In 1917, Baldwin was appointed as the director of the Iowa Child Welfare Research Station (ICWRS). The research station was the first of its kind. For a little over a year, Baldwin was the major of the Sanitary Corps in the Surgeon General of the United States Army office. He helped soldiers psychologically at the Walter Reed Army Medical Center. During the 1920s, Baldwin received grants from the Woman's Christian Temperance Union and the Laura Spelman Rockefeller Memorial to further the goals of the Iowa Child Welfare Research Station. Baldwin worked with others to discover what caused "normal" children to develop. The research station became well known during the late 1920s, while also training nursery schoolteachers and educating parents. Baldwin earned praise for his work internationally. Baldwin had his daughter, who had issues learning, be placed in the ICWRS observational nursery school. After his daughter's learning improved, Baldwin began to believe that IQ tests were misleading which led him to focus more on mental development. Baldwin was a Fellow of the American Association for the Advancement of Science. The book The Psychology of the Preschool Child is Baldwin's study of children ages two to six.

Baldwin died on May 11, 1928, from an infection that he received at a barbershop while being shaved.
