= Debussy (disambiguation) =

Claude Debussy (1862–1918) was a French composer.

Debussy may also refer to:

- Debussy (crater), an impact crater on Mercury
- Debussy (horse), an Irish Thoroughbred racehorse
- 4492 Debussy, a main-belt asteroid

== See also ==
- De Bussy
- Debussy Heights, a minor mountain range in Antarctica
- Pulchrana debussyi, a species of frog
