= Senator Bussey =

Senator Bussey may refer to:

- Cyrus Bussey (1833–1915), Iowa State Senate
- Thomas H. Bussey (1857–1937), New York State Senate
