= George G. Bussey & Co. =

British sporting goods brand

- Industry: Sporting goods and accessories
- Founded: 1864, London
- Founder: George Gibson Bussey
- Fate: Acquired by Alcarum
- Headquarters: London, England
- Area served: Global
- Products: Cricket, tennis, croquet, golf, and polo equipment, billiard tables and accessories, rugby and soccer balls, clothing, and sporting accessories.
- Owner: Alcarum

George G. Bussey & Co. (colloquially GG Bussey), founded 1864 by George Gibson Bussey, was a manufacturer of hunting, cricket, tennis, polo, croquet, football, and rugby equipment.

The firm operated retail premises in London and Paris, manufacturing at its Peckham factory. Bussey was considered the largest manufacturer of athletic goods in London during the late 19th century, with notable accomplishments including the receipt of medals at World Expositions, as well as a longstanding affiliation with W.G. Grace.

Bussey played an integral role in the development of modern tennis racquet technology, working with Babolat to innovate the use of synthetic and gut strings.

== Origins ==
George Gibson Bussey was born 1829 in Yorkshire, to a working family, and found work as an apprentice saddler at a young age. Having moved to London in 1851, he established himself as a saddler and gunsmith, and demonstrated an astute interest in identifying consumer trends. Bussey was reputed to have spent many early mornings strolling through the fashionable shopping areas of London, watching as windows were redecorated with new products, in an effort to ascertain which products were growing in popularity. Using such insight, by 1855 he had registered as a gun-case maker at 173 High Holborn; an apparent intersection of his two primary skill sets.

== Foundations and innovation ==
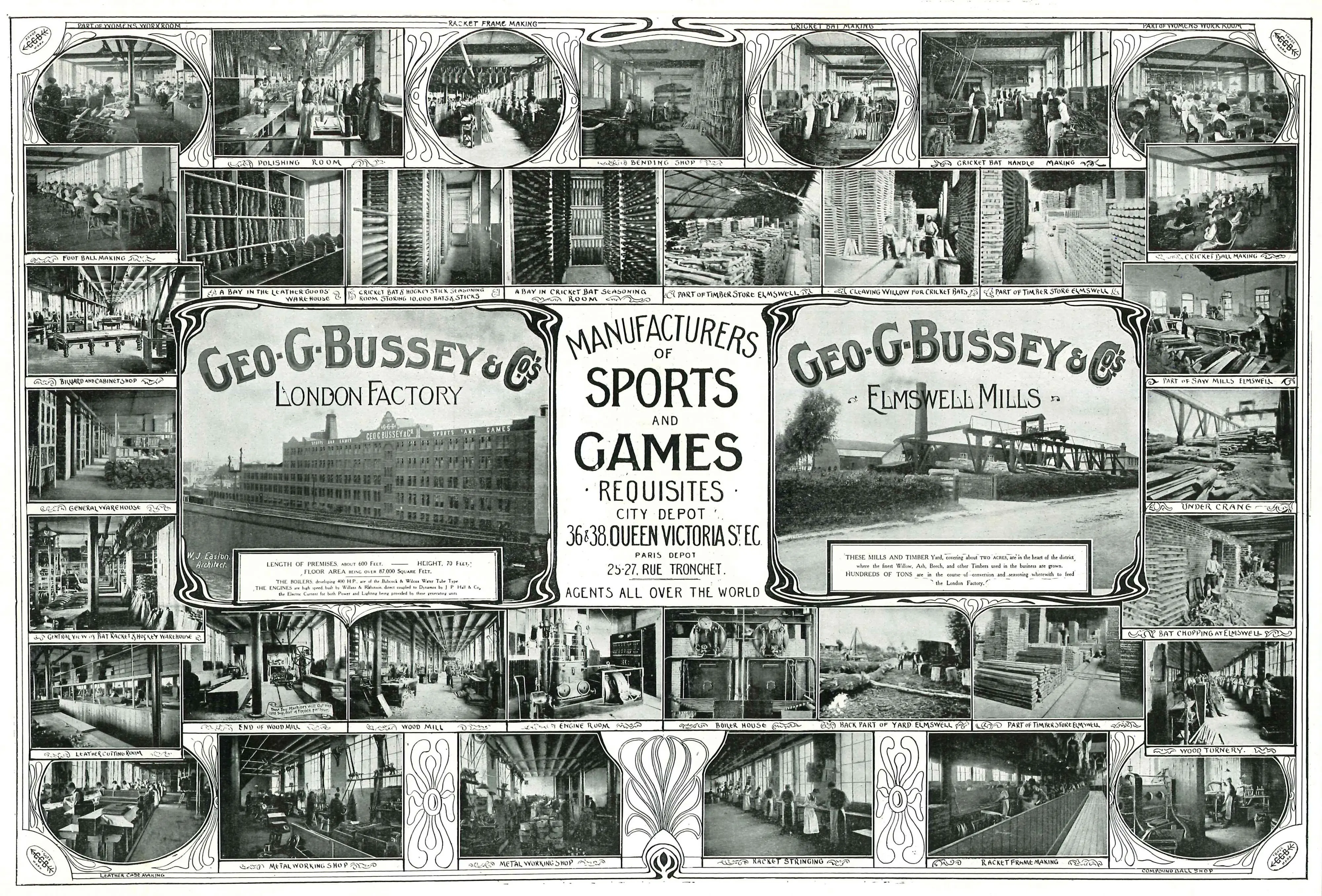
George G. Bussey & Co. Promotional Poster

In 1864 Bussey established a “firearms, ammunition and shooting tackle manufacturer” at the Museum Works in Rye Lane, Peckham, which would trade as George G. Bussey & Co. It was during this time that Bussey’s aptitude for engineering and innovation became apparent, as he filed an array of patents for cartridge carriers, bird-traps, and button fixings. The factory encompassed a museum and a rifle range, the latter extending alongside the railway embankment for over a hundred yards. Bussey’s initial focus upon hunting paraphernalia, and his skills as a saddler and leather maker, were evidenced by the release of the ‘Shephard’s Register Book.’ The leather-bound booklet was intended for hunters to be able to record their scores, weather conditions, and wind with ease in a waistcoat pocket sized book, replete with engraved monogram.

Such sporting paraphernalia was then an emerging phenomenon, as wealthy patrons increasingly pursued a broader array of pastimes and sought the best equipment available. The Bussey company’s growth saw staffing expansions throughout the first half of the new decade; with specialised saddlers recruited from the town of Walsall, famed for its local leather craftsmen. The company’s ambition remained steadfast in its pursuit of sporting innovation, however; and in 1870 the patented ‘Gyro Pigeon and Trap’ was brought to market. The product prompted a print campaign claiming that the new device could “convert the most inexperienced wild, and reckless shooter into a cool, steady, dead-shot, at one-twentieth the cost of live birds.”

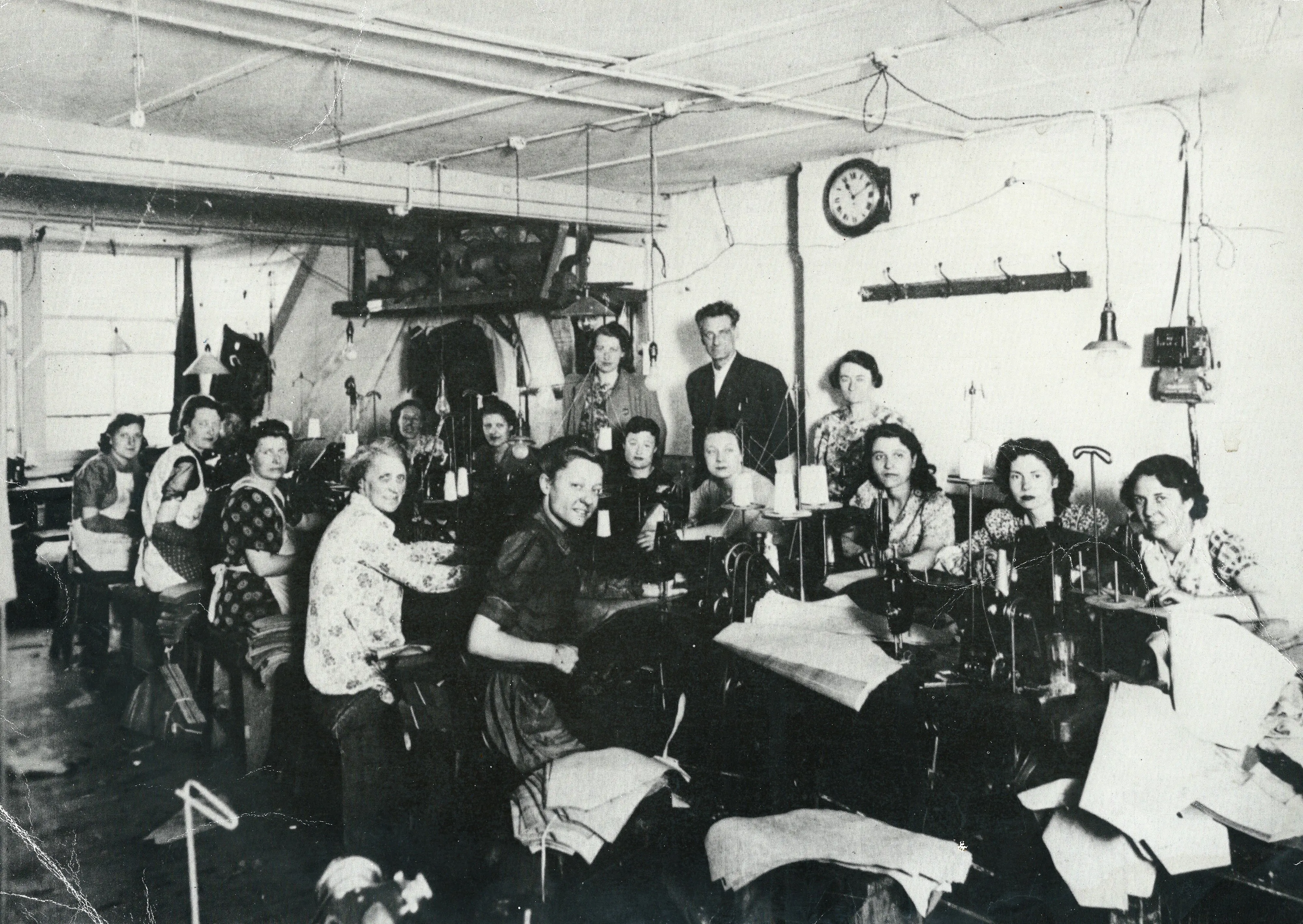
Factory floor of Bussey's Peckham factory.

A major milestone in Bussey’s history came in 1875 when George G. Bussey himself wrote a letter to the gut string maker Pierre Babolat, just one year after the invention of contemporary tennis racquets, to request that Babolat start manufacturing strings for Bussey’s own racquets. Patents for roller skates and air rifles were filed in 1876, alongside Bussey's acclaimed range of tennis, cricket, and croquet equipment.

By 1881, the firm had become a leading British manufacturer, and developed multiple improvements in the production of footballs. This growth strained Bussey’s existing suppliers, and by Autumn of that year a public advertisement seeking willow timber to cater for the growing demand for tennis and cricket equipment was published. This demand did not subside, and Bussey’s offerings of cash in exchange for maiden willow and ash trees became a de facto annual feature of many regional newspapers in the lead up to the cricketing season. Such timber was predominantly employed in the production of lawn tennis racquets, badminton racquets, and croquet mallets.

Such was the sporting spirit in the company that factory workers came together to form a company cricket team in the Autumn of 1882, regularly competing with local clubs and other firms. Sensing that the increasing democratisation of sports such as football and cricket would command an increase in accessibility, Bussey began publishing an annual brochure detailing the upcoming season’s fixtures, statistics, and guides for the improvement of play.

With the increasing popularity of its sporting wares, the company adopted a trademark in the midst of the decade in an effort to differentiate and identify his goods: "G.G.B." with an arrow through the centre. This was made a central feature of print advertisements shortly thereafter. It would become increasingly important in distinguishing Bussey’s innovations, as the mechanisation of lawn tennis ball production caused the sport to flourish.

== Evolution and market expansion ==
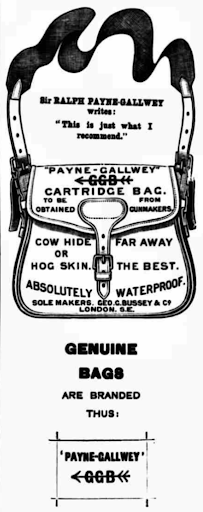
1897 advertisement for G.G. Bussey's cartridge bag.

The continual emphasis George G. Bussey & Co. placed upon innovation and quality was integral to the company’s success, and by 1887 it was considered the largest manufacturer of athletic goods in London. Simultaneously, its annual cricket guide had grown in popularity and content, so much so that it soon constituted a book; complete with diagrams advising batsmen on their stance and how bowlers may best place their field. Focussed upon the morale of his staff, an unusual consideration at that time, Bussey had hosted an annual luncheon for all employees since the company’s inception in 1864. 1887 was no exception, and marked a unique time when staff were invited to Bussey’s own picturesque residence outside Ryde, Brookfield House, for a day of games and food. Over 150 staff arrived at the property, and reports suggest a pleasant day was had by all, celebrating both the Queen’s Golden Jubilee, and another successful year for the company. The property’s ornate grounds and house had once been the Summer residence of the Marquis of Exeter.

In the Autumn of 1889 tragedy struck at the heart of the company, with founder George Gibson Bussey dying at Brookfield House. His demise was marked with a renewed determination to continue his legacy; and two months later, his eldest son, William E. Bussey, delivered a speech to all employees. The speech focussed largely upon the reading of a letter authored by his father, a letter which contained instructions that upon his demise all employees were to receive a cheque and an expression of gratitude, and warned that “the young men not, in consequence of it, [rush] headlong into matrimony, and the young ladies not to build too many castle in the clouds.” W.E. Bussey also said that his father had often been dismayed that many business owners “knew little of, or [were] apt to forget those who served [them]” and thus he had made an effort throughout his career to appreciate those in his employ. Bussey’s wishes were fulfilled, and approximately £1000 was shared amongst the employees; the evening closed with the new head of the firm, W.E. Bussey, expressing “his determination to be the friend as well as the employer of all those assisting him in the business.” In spite of the founder's death, by 1892 George G. Bussey & Co. had reaffirmed its place in the London sporting goods markets through the start of partnerships with cricket dealers across the country. Whilst the business endeavoured to continue as normal, some subtle yet poignant changes transpired, notably, the annual company luncheon was moved to Hampton Court.

With innovation and an intuition for identifying market trends at the core of the company, the proliferation of football was watched with keen interest. In 1892 the decision was made to implement a print campaign appealing directly to the secretaries of various association football clubs, emphasising the quality of the company’s footballs, as well as their London-based production. But this endeavour could not divert attention from cricket as the national pastime.

The company sought to reiterate the comprehensiveness of their catalogue, whilst directly reaching consumers, by opening a city department at 36-38 Queen Victoria Street, London. The new store, and emphasis upon cricket equipment, warranted the support of a new advertising campaign emphasising the brand’s availability across the globe; with a series of bold illustrations showing the Bussey range of bats, the brand’s trademark, and a cricket ball. Whilst cricket remained the core of Bussey’s offering, the democratisation of golf, with an end to the public perception that quality golfing equipment might only be produced in Scotland, was a welcome trend for the company. This new “frame of mind” was supposedly encouraged by manufacturers such as George G. Bussey & Co., who sought to capture the broader market now aspiring to play golf.

== Pinnacle and the Demon Driver ==
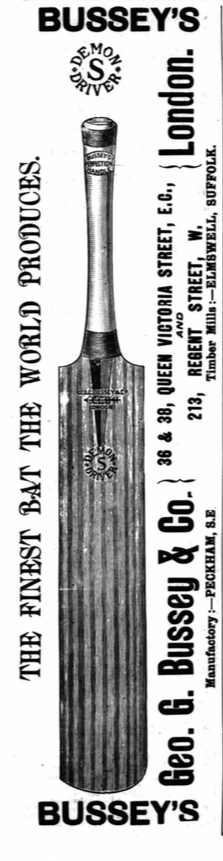
1899 advertisement for Bussey's 'Demon Driver'

During the Summer of 1897, Bussey was invited to exhibit at the Imperial Victorian Exhibition, held at the Crystal Palace; this let the company showcase manufacturing prowess whilst promoting the breadth of their catalogue to visitors. Such a catalogue now offered “every requisite for cricket, unequalled tennis rackets, every requisite for lawn tennis, best value for croquet [both] modest and superb, high grade golf clubs, [and] every requisite for golf.” This diverse catalogue continued to be manufactured in Peckham, as had been done since 1864, but also now in Elmswell, Suffolk. One product defined the brand in the eyes of many: the Demon Driver. Edward H.D. Sewell wrote of the bat, “I consider no bat equal to your ‘Demon Driver’ - which, as I recently scored six centuries, and over 1500 runs in fourteen innings with one, I can speak with sufficient experience.” Such acclaim for Bussey’s Demon Driver also stemmed from William G. Grace, who played with the bat on multiple occasions. The Marylebone Cricket Club maintains a treatise of the evolution of Bussey's bats within their Lord’s Cricket Ground archive in light of the maker's formidable role in Victorian-era cricket. In order to capture public admiration, G.G. Bussey & Co. hosted regular competitions to win Demon Drivers, with successful entrants visiting the firm’s Athletic Emporium in Queen Victoria Street to learn about the manufacturing process and ultimately select a driver of their own.

One of the firm’s greatest accomplishments occurred in the Summer of 1900, when at the Paris Exposition Universelle it was awarded a gold medal for sports and games. This was likely a catalyst for the supply shortages that impacted the market, with immense demand exceeding the firm’s production capacity. In light of this an advertising campaign was begun, announcing that the reason for such difficulty in procuring a Demon Driver was because the firm refused to alter their production methods due to a fear of compromising their renowned quality. The manufacturing complexity and quality assurance is evident in the fact that it required 21 pounds of willow sapwood to produce a single driver. Simultaneously, changes in print media in the early years of the 20th century enabled the firm to introduce graphic advertisements with ornate depictions of the product range, consolidated around cricket, lawn tennis, football, hockey, polo, golf, and croquet.

Intent on maintaining their rapid rate of growth, and seeking to capitalise upon the brand’s growth, G. G. Bussey & Co., by now an incorporated company, undertook a share offering; 55,000 cumulative preference shares and 120,000 ordinary shares were offered in June of 1906 for a total capital raise of £175,000. Such an amount in contemporary terms exceeds £20 million. The abridged prospectus details the possession of four properties; a factory in Peckham, timber mills in Elmswell, a store in London, and a depot in Paris at 25-27 Rue Tronchet. Evidence of the business’s ubiquity is seen in an extract:

The business, which is mainly wholesale and export, has been built up entirely upon the value of its productions, and practically without advertising; it rests, therefore, upon the most substantial foundation and relies upon its excellent reputation both with the trade and the public not only in Great Britain, Ireland, India, and the Colonies, but also in Foreign Countries, where British sports and games are becoming increasingly popular. The [products] of G.G. Bussey & Co. are handled by over 2,000 trade customers, being stocked in every Continental Capital and numerous towns in Europe and America, and there are few parts of the British Empire where their trademark is not well known.

The intent of the capital raise was to accumulate funds to expand production at the Peckham manufactory, notably construction of a new factory with frontage of 582 feet, and capacity for over 1000 employees. The board's ambitions, underpinned by the positive reception of the offering, compelled the firm to purchase enough willow timber to manufacture 100,000 bats, in addition to the 20,000 held in stock. The company accounts associated with the prospectus, audited by Deloitte, Plender, Griffiths & Co., valued the business’s net assets at £110,000.

In the build-up to the 1910 Wimbledon Championships, Bussey introduced a Demon Driver racquet to its collection of lawn tennis equipment, adapting the willow sapwood that had made its cricket bats renowned for their light weight and strength. The expansion of the line also saw the introduction of a junior Demon Driver variant, priced to encourage new entrants to the sport. By 1913, and with the recently completed factory starting production, Bussey spent more to develop its brand as synonymous with quality lawn tennis and cricketing equipment. Such a strategy produced mixed results, with the company returning its first dividend on preference shares at the end of 1919.

== Twilight ==
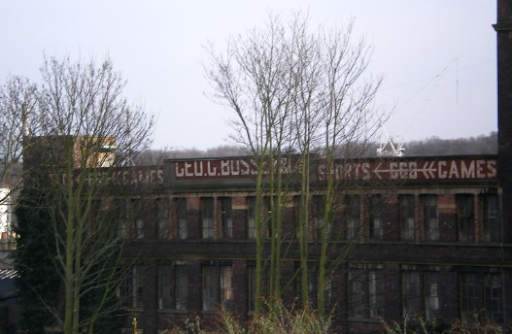
G.G. Bussey's factory shortly following closure. Today the building has been rejuvenated as a community space.

By 1920, half-yearly dividends had reached 10% reflecting the company’s strong growth, and in 1922 provided a slightly tempered 8.5%. G.G. Bussey & Co.’s aforementioned graphic advertisements at times featured the rhyme “If you want a bat that will drive, or ball that will stand, a guard for the leg, or a glove for the hand, a bag of good hide that’s thoroughly tanned, your requirements are met by G.G.B. brand.” Such advertisements and their engaging illustrations were not exclusive to Bussey’s cricketing range; and in a renewed push to promote both football and rugby, advertisements announced Bussey as the supplier of Olympic and Association footballs.

The ever-changing nature of London and Europe’s social sporting scene gave rise to a gradual restructuring of the firm’s product hierarchy, and in 1929 the Demon Driver was challenged as the pinnacle bat with the introduction of the Wearwell, with an innovative vellum covered blade. The new bat was intended to offer cricket clubs globally with high quality bats with improved durability and serviceability.

Today, the original Bussey premises remain in Peckham, and have been repurposed into a public space with a cinema, bar, offices, and cafes.

In 2021, the brand rights were acquired by Alcarum.
