= Oxford Castle =

Partly ruined castle in Oxford in Oxfordshire, England

- Oxfordshire, England
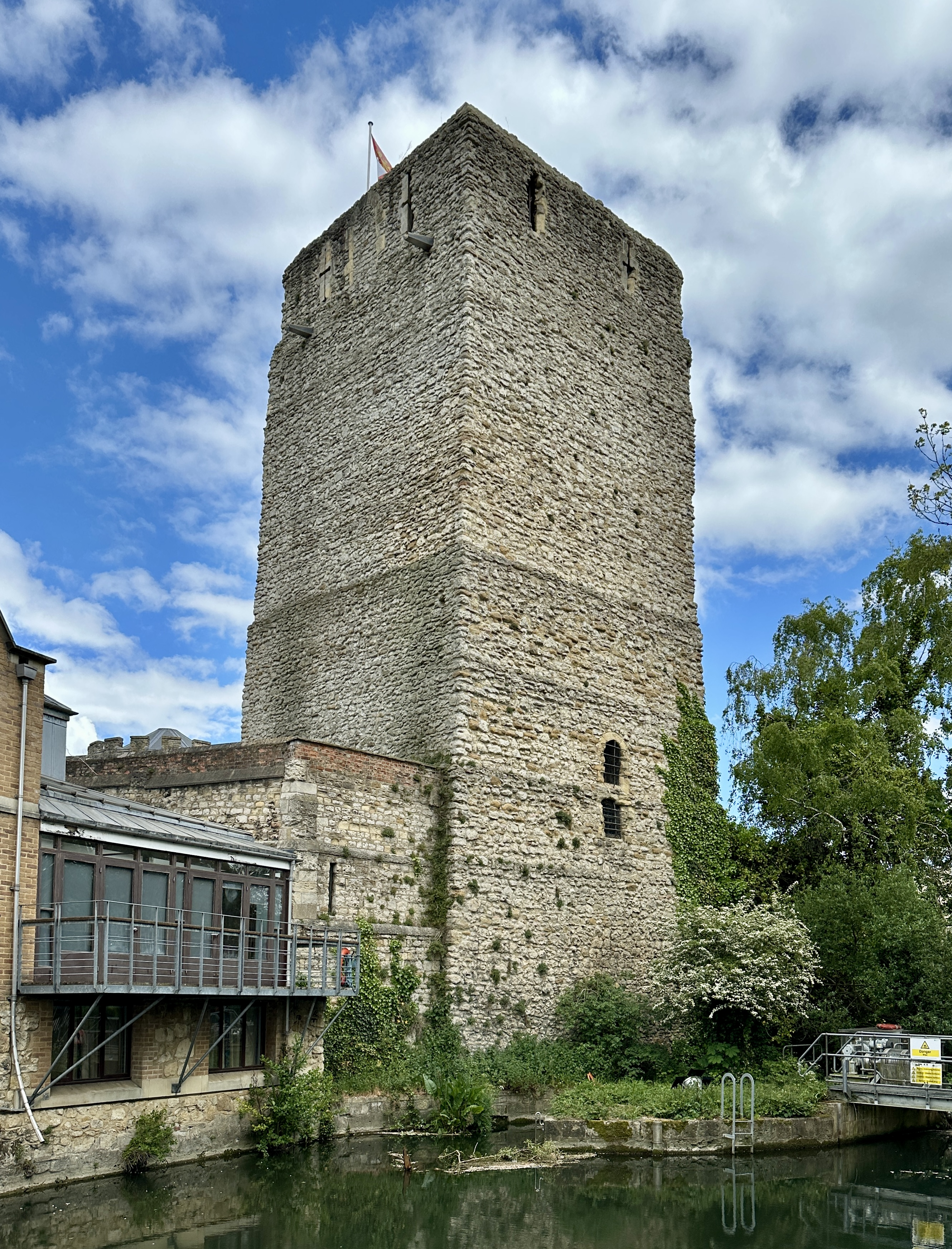
- St George's Tower, Oxford Castle, viewed from the Castle Mill Stream

Site information
- Type: Shell keep and bailey
- Owner: Oxfordshire County Council
- Condition: Ruined, elements used as a hotel

Location
- Shown within Oxfordshire
- Location within Oxfordshire
- Coordinates: 51.7517°N 1.2632°W
- Grid reference: grid reference SP509063

Site history
- Materials: Coral rag and gravel

Oxford Castle is a large, partly ruined medieval castle on the western side of central Oxford in Oxfordshire, England. Most of the original moated, wooden motte and bailey castle was replaced in stone in the late 12th or early 13th century and the castle played an important role in the conflict known as the Anarchy. In the 14th century the military value of the castle diminished and the site came to be used primarily for county administration and as a prison. The surviving rectangular St George's Tower is now believed to pre-date the remainder of the castle and to have been a watch tower associated with the original Saxon west gate of the city.

Most of the castle was destroyed in the English Civil War and by the 18th century the remaining buildings had become Oxford's local prison. A new prison complex was built on the site from 1785 onwards and expanded in 1876; this became HM Prison Oxford.

The prison closed in 1996 and was redeveloped as a hotel and visitor attraction. The medieval remains of the castle including the motte, St George's Tower and crypt, are Grade I listed buildings and a Scheduled Monument.

== History ==
=== Construction ===
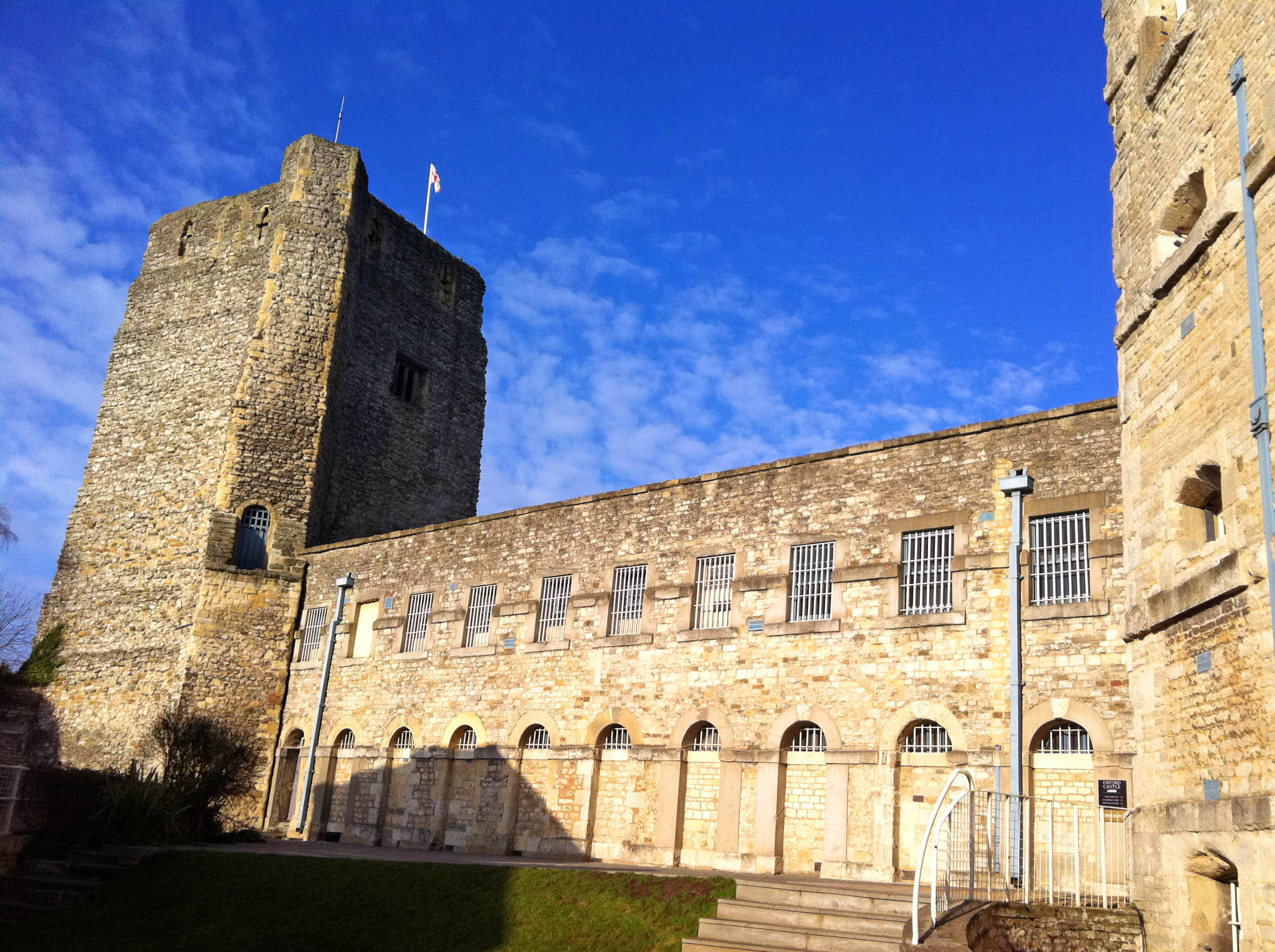
St George's Tower and D wing, Oxford Castle, England

According to the Historia Ecclesie Abbendonensis (Abingdon Chronicle), Oxford Castle was built by the Norman baron Robert D'Oyly the elder from 1071 to 1073. D'Oyly had arrived in England with William I the Conqueror in the Norman Conquest of England, and William granted him extensive lands in Oxfordshire. Oxford had been stormed in the invasion with considerable damage, and William directed D'Oyly to build a castle to dominate the town. In due course D'Oyly became the foremost landowner in Oxfordshire and was confirmed with a hereditary royal constableship for Oxford Castle. Oxford Castle is not among the 48 recorded in the Domesday Book of 1086, but not every castle in existence at the time was recorded in the survey. D'Oyly (d'Oilly)'s Oxford holdings are, however, mentioned in the Domesday Book as "Meadow 30 acres. 1 mill, value 10 shillings. The mill mentioned is presumably the Castle Mill, formerly adjacent to the still surviving St. George's Tower, rebuilt in 1781 before eventually being demolished in 1930. (Note: As evidenced by this photograph, the later mill was a quite extensive building, occupying three storeys when viewed from the southern side.)

D'Oyly positioned his castle to the west side of the town, using the natural protection of a stream off the River Thames on the far side of the castle, now called Castle Mill Stream, and diverting the stream to produce a moat. There has been debate as to whether there was an earlier English fortification on the site, but whilst there is archaeological evidence of earlier Anglo-Saxon habitation there is no conclusive evidence of fortification. Oxford Castle was an "urban castle", overlying a portion of the Saxon town wall, but it remains uncertain whether local buildings were demolished to make room for it. Poore et al. (2009) give a suggested street plan of the town in late Saxon times (their figure 4) showing the then town wall with its north, west, south and east gates; at the north gate is the Saxon tower now associated with the church of St Michael at the North Gate, while the west gate is occupied by the apparently Saxon tower of St. George's, which is now believed to have subsequently been incorporated into the fabric of the later Norman castle.

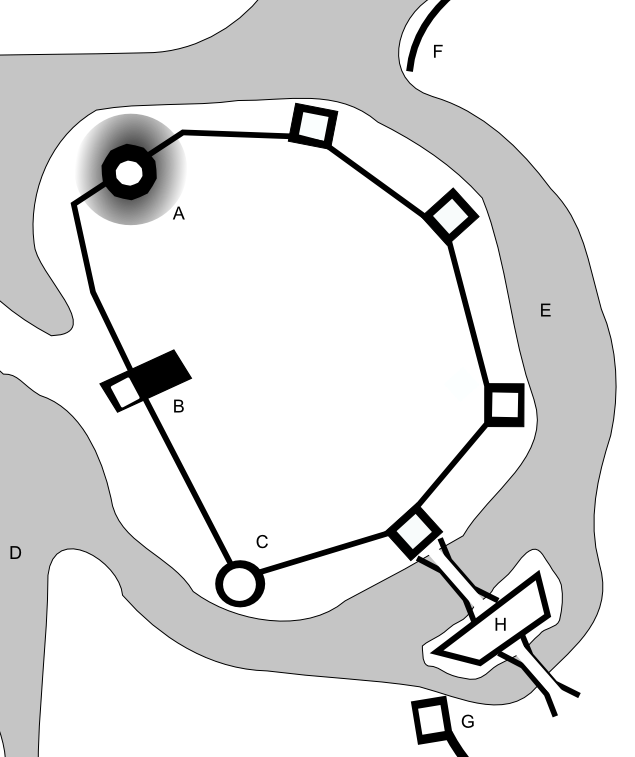
Oxford Castle, around 1250. A: The keep and motte; B: St George's Tower and Chapel; C: The Round Tower; D: River Isis; E: Moat; F: City wall; G: West Gate; H: Barbican

The initial castle was probably a large motte and bailey, copying the plan of the castle that D'Oyly had already built 12 miles (19 km) away at Wallingford. The motte was originally about 60 feet (18 m) high and 40 feet (12 m) wide, constructed like the bailey from layers of gravel and strengthened with clay facing. There has been debate over the sequencing of the motte and the bailey: it has been suggested that the bailey may have built first (thus utilising the pre-existing St. George's Tower as the first keep) which would make the initial castle design a ringwork rather than a motte and bailey.

By the late 12th to early 13th century, the original palisade walls and wooden keep had been replaced in stone. The new curtain wall incorporated St George's Tower, which is built of coral rag stone, 30 by 30 feet (9 m × 9 m) at the base and tapering significantly toward the top for stability. This was the tallest of the castle's towers, and is now believed to be a survival from late Saxon times (c. 1020) as a watch tower associated with the west gate of the Saxon city. Evidence that this tower is Saxon in origin and thus pre-dates the castle itself is presented in Poore et al. (2009), who comment that "a single, massive stone tower does not seem to belong within the outer defences of an earth-and-timber castle", and other sources have concurred on architectural grounds, also noting that its orientation does not match that of the remainder of the castle, and that its height would have originally afforded an extensive view over the city, but which would have been superseded (and in fact, blocked) with the construction of the castle motte. The date of the remaining towers is uncertain although the southernmost, round tower, of which the base still remains, is dated to 1235 in various documentary sources, including Woolnoth's The Ancient Castles of England and Wales of 1825; in at least one source, it is referred to as "Henry III's Tower".

Inside the walls the buildings included a chapel with a crypt attached to St George’s Tower, which may be on the site of a previous church. The chapel originally had a nave, chancel and an apsidal sanctuary. It was a typical early Norman design with solid pillars and arches. In 1074 D'Oyly and his close friend, Roger d'Ivry had endowed a chapel with a college of priests, which is presumed to be the structure in question; at an early stage it acquired a dedication to Saint George. As detailed below, the crypt of this chapel still survives, albeit in a new location within the castle, having been moved and reconstructed from its original materials in 1794.

The ten-sided stone shell keep, 58 feet (18 m), constructed in the 13th century to replace an earlier wooden structure, closely resembled those of Tonbridge and Arundel Castles. The keep enclosed a number of buildings, leaving an inner courtyard only 22 feet (7 m) across. Within the keep, stairs led 20 feet (6 m) down to an underground 12 feet (3.7 m) wide stone chamber, with an Early English hexagonal vault and a 54 feet (16 m) deep well providing water in the event of a siege.

=== Role in the Anarchy and Barons War ===
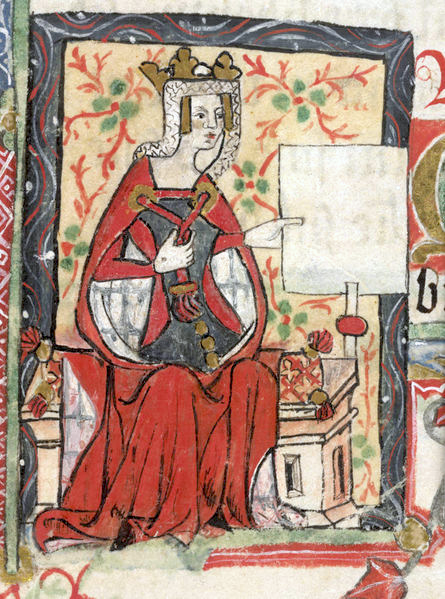
Empress Matilda escaped from a siege of Oxford Castle in 1141 during The Anarchy.

Robert D'Oyly the younger, Robert D'Oyly the elder's nephew, had inherited the castle by the time of the civil war of the Anarchy in the 1140s. After initially supporting King Stephen, Robert declared his support for Empress Matilda, Stephen's cousin and rival for the throne, and in 1141 the Empress marched to Oxford to base her campaign at the castle. Stephen responded by marching from Bristol in the Autumn of 1142, attacking and seizing the town of Oxford and besieging Matilda in the castle. Stephen set up two siege mounds beside the castle, called Jew's Mount and Mount Pelham, on which he placed siege engines, largely for show, and proceeded to wait for Matilda's supplies to run low over the next three months. Stephen would have had difficulty in supplying his men through the winter period, and this decision shows the apparent strength of Oxford Castle at the time.

Finally in December, Matilda responded by escaping from the castle; the popular version of this has the Empress waiting until the Castle Mill Stream was frozen over and then dressed in white as camouflage in the snow, being lowered down the walls with three or four knights, before escaping through Stephen's lines in the night as the king's sentries tried to raise the alarm. The chronicler William of Malmesbury, however, suggests Matilda did not descend the walls, but instead escaped from one of the gates. Matilda safely reached Abingdon-on-Thames and Oxford Castle surrendered to Stephen the next day. Robert had died in the final weeks of the siege and the castle was granted to William de Chesney for the remainder of the war. At the end of the war the constableship of Oxford Castle was granted to Roger de Bussy before being reclaimed by Henry D'Oyly, Robert D'Oyly the younger's son, in 1154.

In the Barons' War of 1215–17 the castle was attacked again, prompting further improvements in its defences. In 1220 Falkes de Breauté, who controlled many royal castles in the middle of England, demolished the Church of St Budoc to the south-east of the castle and built a moated barbican to further defend the main gate. The remaining wooden buildings were replaced in stone, including the new Round Tower which was built in 1235. King Henry III turned part of the castle into a prison, specifically for holding troublesome University clerks, and also improved the castle chapel, replacing the older barred windows with stained glass in 1243 and 1246. Due to the presence of Beaumont Palace to the north of Oxford, however, the castle never became a royal residence.

=== 14th–17th centuries ===
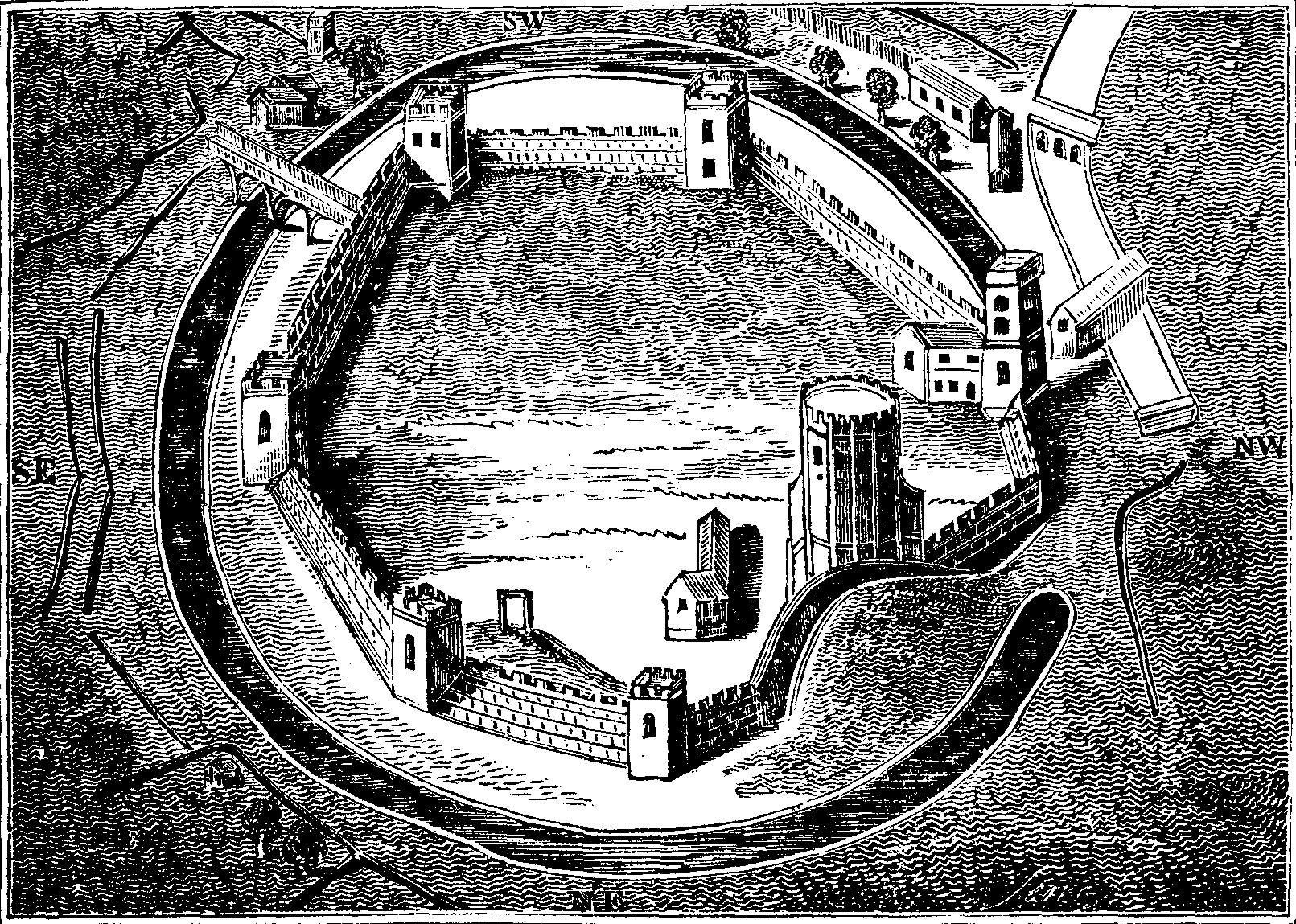
Oxford Castle in the 16th century. Engraving after detail on the earliest map of Oxford by Ralph Agas, 1578 published in The Mirror of Literature, Amusement, and Instruction, Vol. 12, No. 328, August 23, 1828

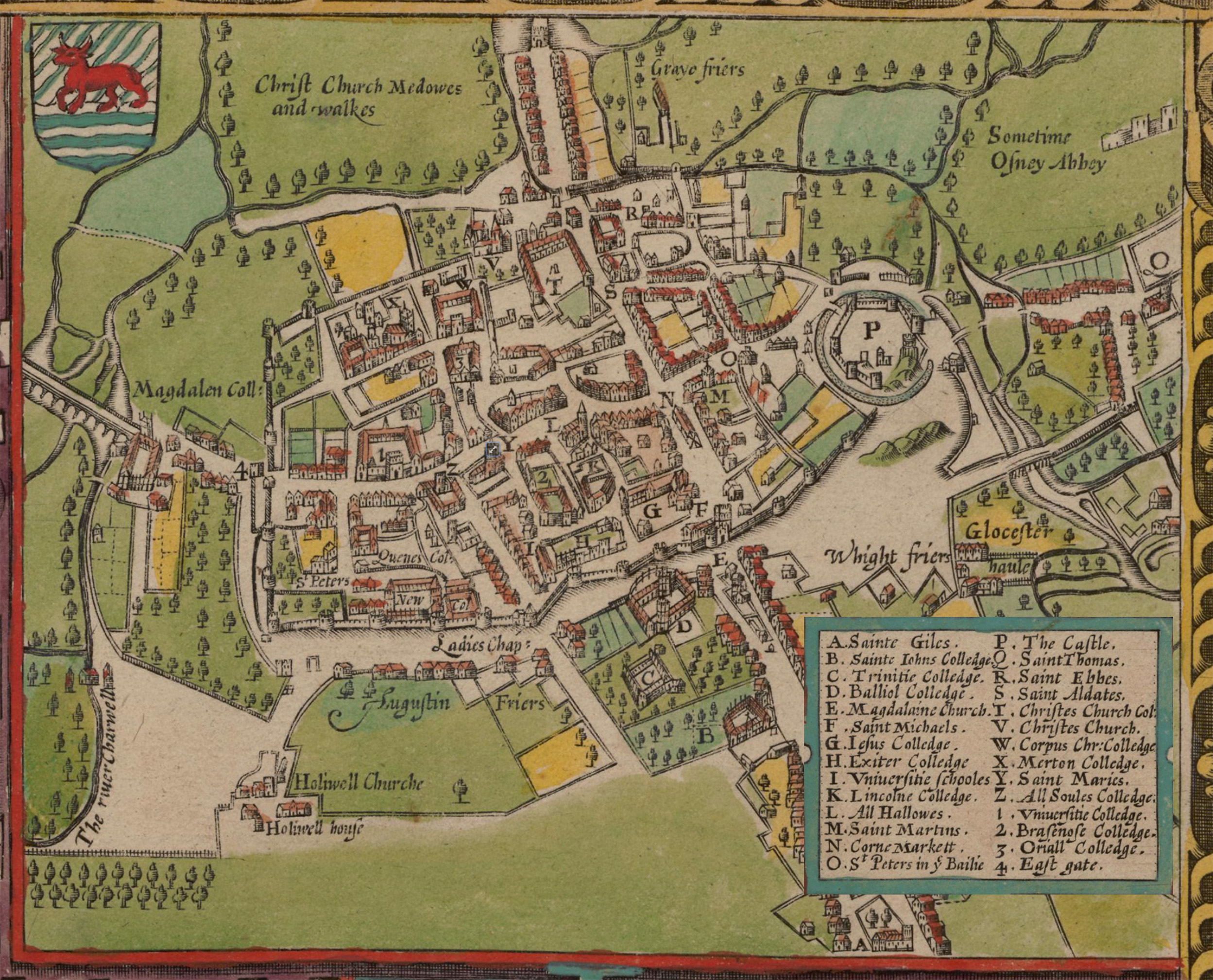
John Speed's map of Oxford, 1605, showing the castle (labelled "P") at upper right. (North is at the bottom of this map)

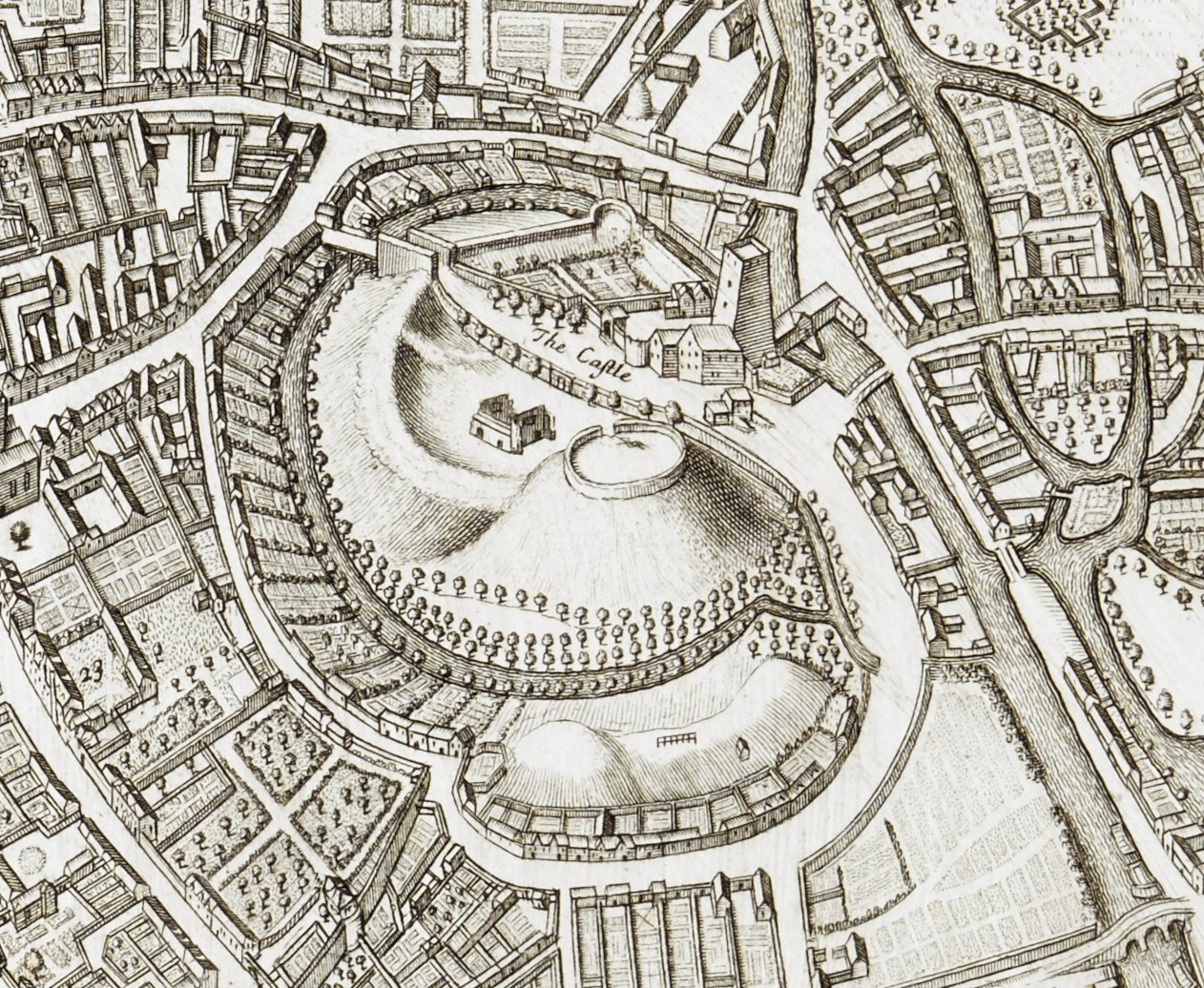
Remains of the remodelled Oxford Castle in the early 1670s: detail from David Loggan's Oxonia Illustrata map/bird's eye view, published in 1675 (BL 128.h.10), with north at the bottom. The Castle Mill is visible adjacent in the stream adjacent to the prominent St. George's Tower, and a portion of the round base of the southernmost tower also remains.

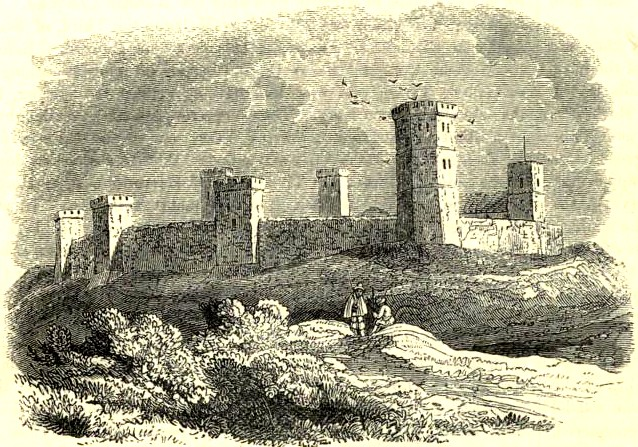
How an artist in 1845 imagined Oxford Castle looked in the 15th century; a possibly more realistic reconstruction of the appearance of the castle in Norman times is available here.

By 1327 the fortification, particularly the castle gates and the barbican, was in poor condition and £800 was estimated to be required for repairs. From the 1350s onwards the castle had little military use and was increasingly allowed to fall into disrepair.

On 13 January 1400, Henry IV sat in judgment at Oxford Castle over rebels from Cirencester and other places, who had participated in the Epiphany Rising, or the Revolt of the Earls, men who supported Richard II, Henry’s cousin whom the latter had murdered by starvation. The castle became the centre for the administration of the county of Oxford, a jail, and a criminal court. Assizes were held there until 1577, when plague broke out in what became known as the "Black Assize": the Lord Lieutenant of Oxfordshire, two knights, eighty gentlemen and the entire grand jury for the session all died, including Sir Robert D'Oyley, a relative of the founder of the castle. Thereafter assizes ceased to be held at the castle.

Ralph Agas's map of Oxford in 1578 shows that by then, while the curtain wall, keep and towers remained, the barbican had been demolished to make way for houses. Hassall, 1976, states that by 1600 the moat was almost entirely silted up and houses had been built all around the edge of the bailey wall, although this is contradicted by the castle's appearance in John Speed's map of Oxford, 1605. In 1611 King James I sold Oxford Castle to Francis James and Robert Younglove, who in turn sold it to Christ Church (a college of the university) in 1613. The college then leased it to a number of local families over the coming years. By this time, Oxford Castle was in a weakened state, with a large crack running down the side of the keep. A map of the castle prepared for Christ Church in 1615 shows the keep on its mound, St George's Tower with associated buildings and sections of the curtain wall remaining to the north and south, and the next tower to the south, plus a single remaining tower to the north-east, as well as the Castle Mill and a southern entrance to the castle complex; this map indicates that by 1615 houses and gardens had been laid out over more than half of the Castle Ditch or moat, which appears to still contain water.

In 1642, the First English Civil War broke out, and the Royalists made Oxford their capital. Parliamentary forces successfully besieged Oxford in 1646, and the city was occupied by Colonel Richard Ingoldsby. Ingoldsby improved the fortification of the castle rather than the surrounding town, and in 1649 demolished most of the medieval stonework, replacing it with more modern earth bulwarks and reinforcing the keep with earth works to form a probable gun-platform. In 1652, in the third English Civil War, the Parliamentary garrison responded to the proximity of Charles II's forces by pulling down these defences as well and retreating to New College instead, causing great damage to the college in the process. In the event, Oxford saw no fresh fighting; early in the 18th century, however, the keep was demolished and the top of the motte landscaped into its current form.

=== Role as prison ===
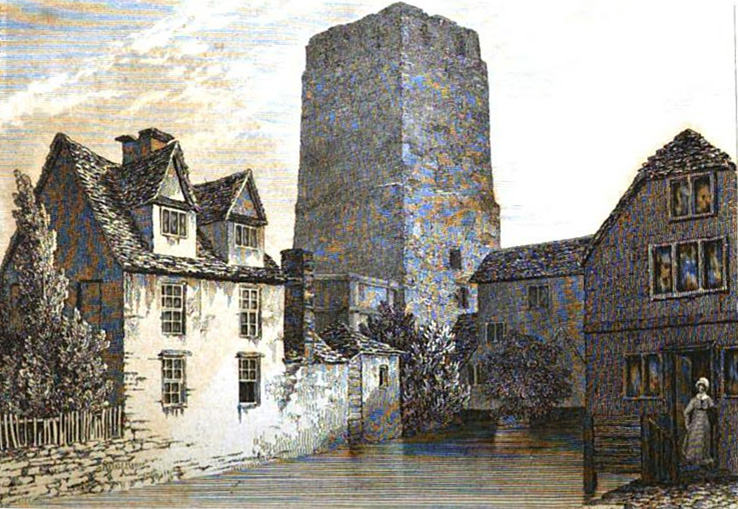
St George's Tower in 1832, viewed from across the Castle Mill Stream; the water mill (Castle Mill) is visible, immediately to the right of the tower, built across the stream.

After the Civil War, Oxford Castle served primarily as the local prison. As with other prisons at the time, the owners, in this case Christ Church College, leased the castle to wardens who would profit by charging prisoners for their board and lodging. The prison also had a gallows to execute prisoners, such as Mary Blandy in 1752. For most of the 18th century, the castle prison was run by the local Etty and Wisdom families and was in increasing disrepair. A view of the castle published in 1769 in the work "England Displayed" by P. Russell and Owen Price is of interest in that it shows the appearance of the chapel attached to St George's tower prior to its demolition in 1794, as well as the motte and some then-surviving portions of the curtain wall including an arch or gateway in the wall immediately to the north of the tower. The chapel and/or associated buildings are also shown, from a range of angles, in views by other artists including Samuel and Nathaniel Buck's Antiquities (drawing dated 1729), a 1773 engraving included in Francis Grose's Antiquities of England and Wales, 1786, a painting by Michael Angelo Rooker dating from 1779, and a view by the artist John Baptist Malchair dating from 1784. In the 1770s the prison reformer John Howard visited the castle several times, and criticised its size and quality, including the extent to which vermin infested the prison. Partly as a result of this criticism, it was decided by the County authorities to rebuild the Oxford Prison.

In 1785 the castle was bought by the Oxford County Justices and rebuilding began under the London architect William Blackburn. The wider castle site had already begun to change by the late 18th century, with New Road being built through the bailey and the last parts of the castle moat being filled in to allow the building of the new Oxford Canal terminus. Building the new prison included demolishing the old chapel attached to St George's tower and repositioning part of the crypt in 1794. The work was completed under Daniel Harris in 1805. Harris gained a reasonable salary as the new governor and used convict labour from the prison to conduct early archaeological excavations at the castle with the help of the antiquarian Edward King.

In the 19th century the site continued to be developed, with various new buildings built including the new County Hall in 1840–41 and the Oxfordshire Militia Armoury in 1854. The prison itself was extended in 1876, growing to occupy most of the remaining space. The inmates included children, the youngest being a seven-year-old girl sentenced to seven days hard labour in 1870 for stealing a pram. In 1888 national prison reforms led to the renaming of the county prison as HM Prison Oxford.

=== Today ===
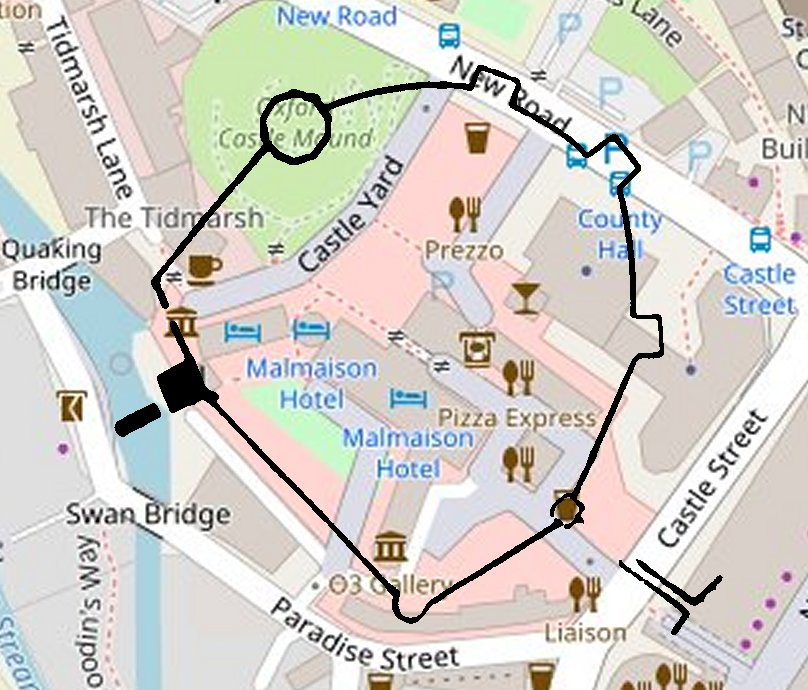
Oxford Castle approximate extent, versus present-day features: castle outline from Booth et al., 2003; basemap from OpenStreetMap, June 2018. St. George's Tower is at the western limit of the castle boundary, with the adjoining Castle Mill; at the southern limit is the outline of the single original round tower whose base still remains under one of the cell blocks of the former prison.

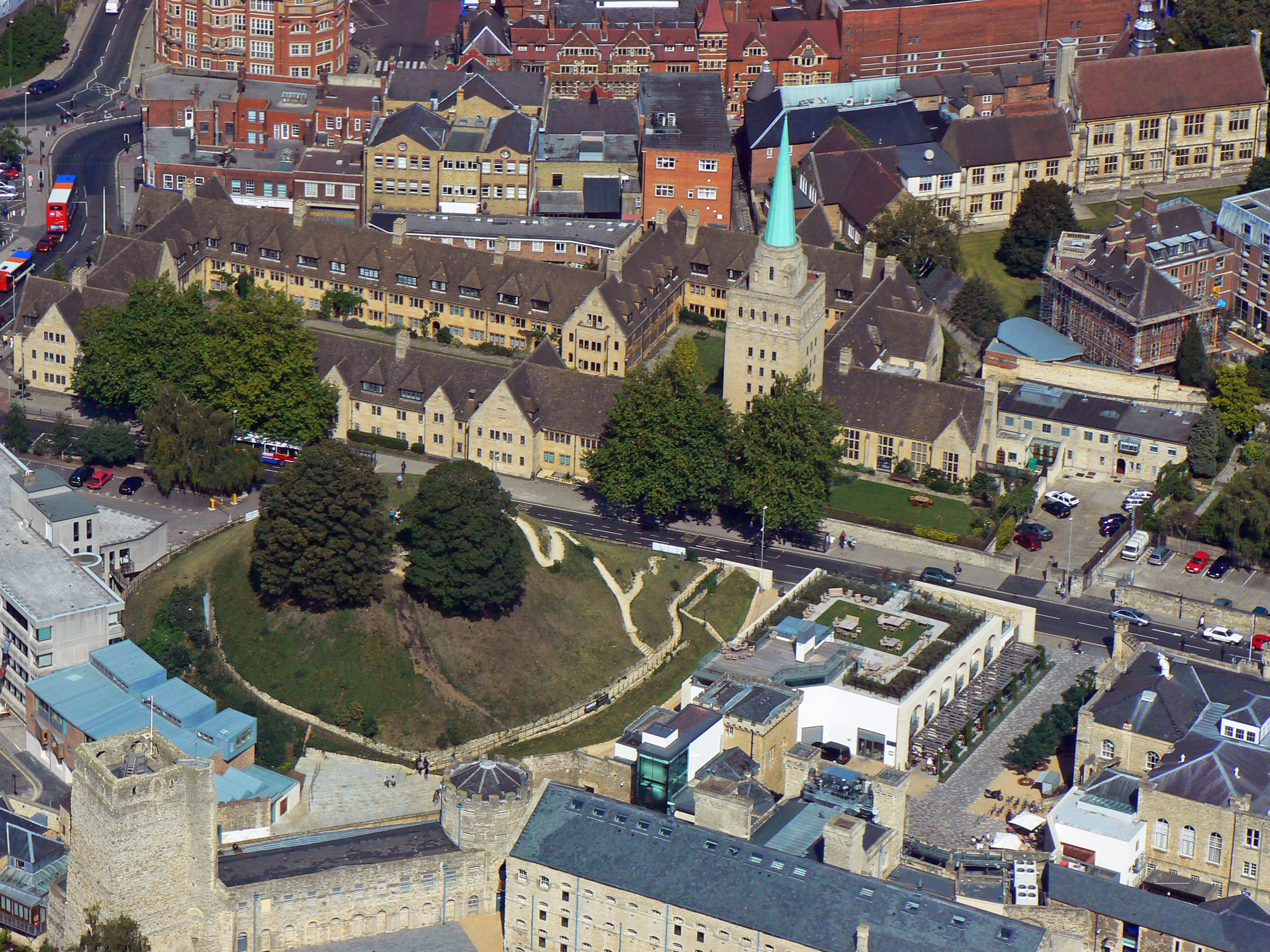
Aerial view of the castle in 2006, showing the castle motte centre left, the square St George's Tower front left and the round Debtors' Tower (constructed in the 18th century, not part of the original building). Behind is Nuffield College with its square tower with a copper-covered flèche.

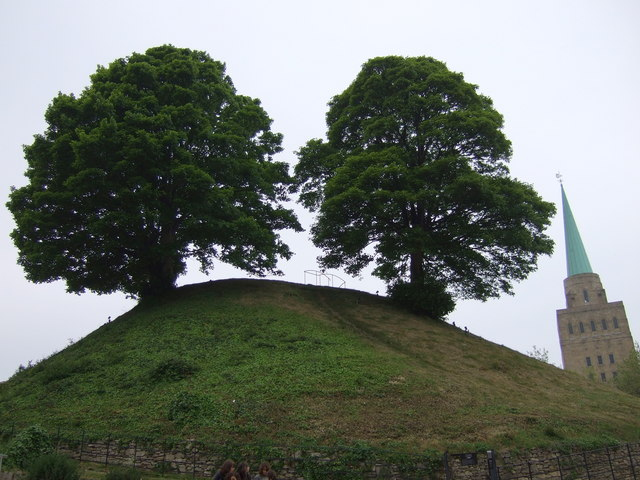
Oxford Castle motte in 2009

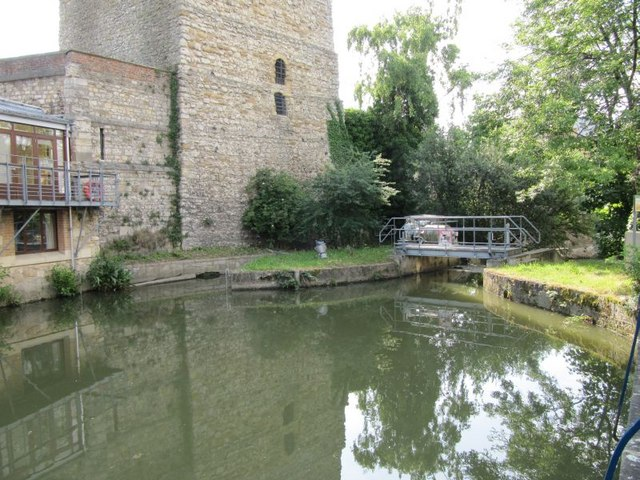
The weir by St. George's Tower in 2009, site of the original Castle Mill

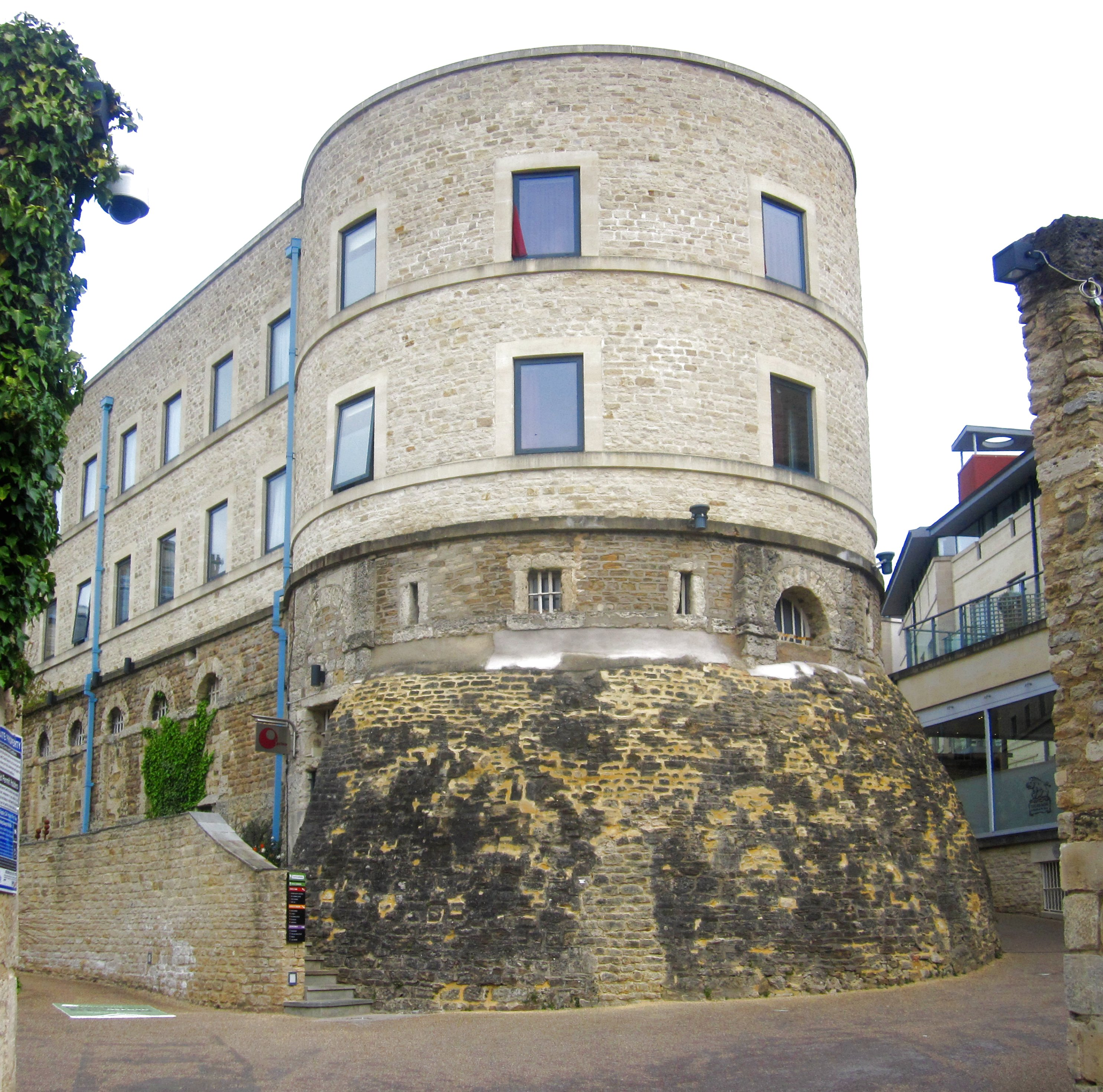
Round Tower and C Wing of Oxford Prison in Oxford Castle. Buildings and batter by William Blackburn 1785–90, on foundations of 1235 round tower

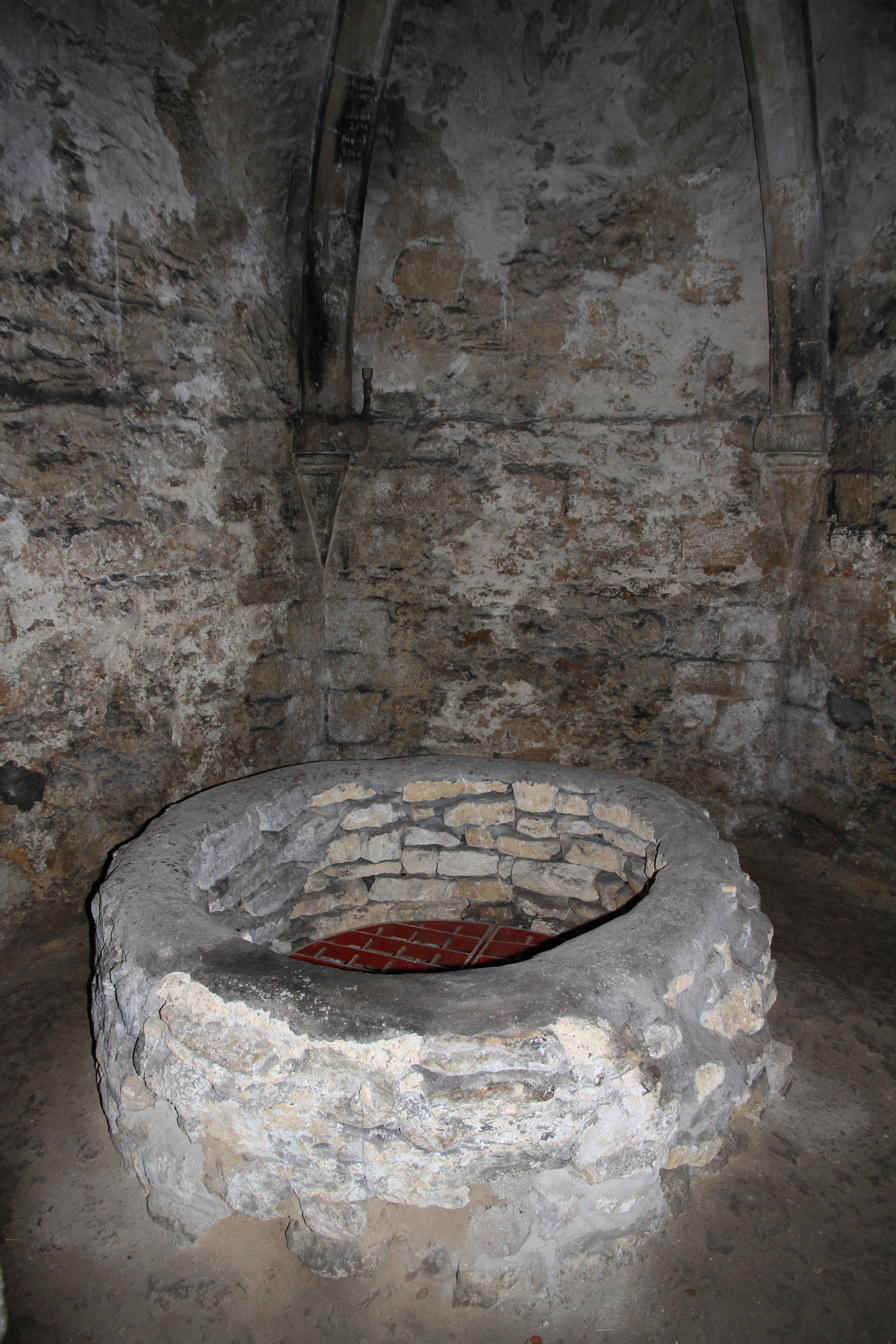
The 13th-century well inside the 11th-century motte

Today, the remains of the Saxon St.George's Tower, Motte-and-Bailey Mound, the Prison D-Wing and Debtor's Tower make up the Oxford Castle & Prison tourist attraction.

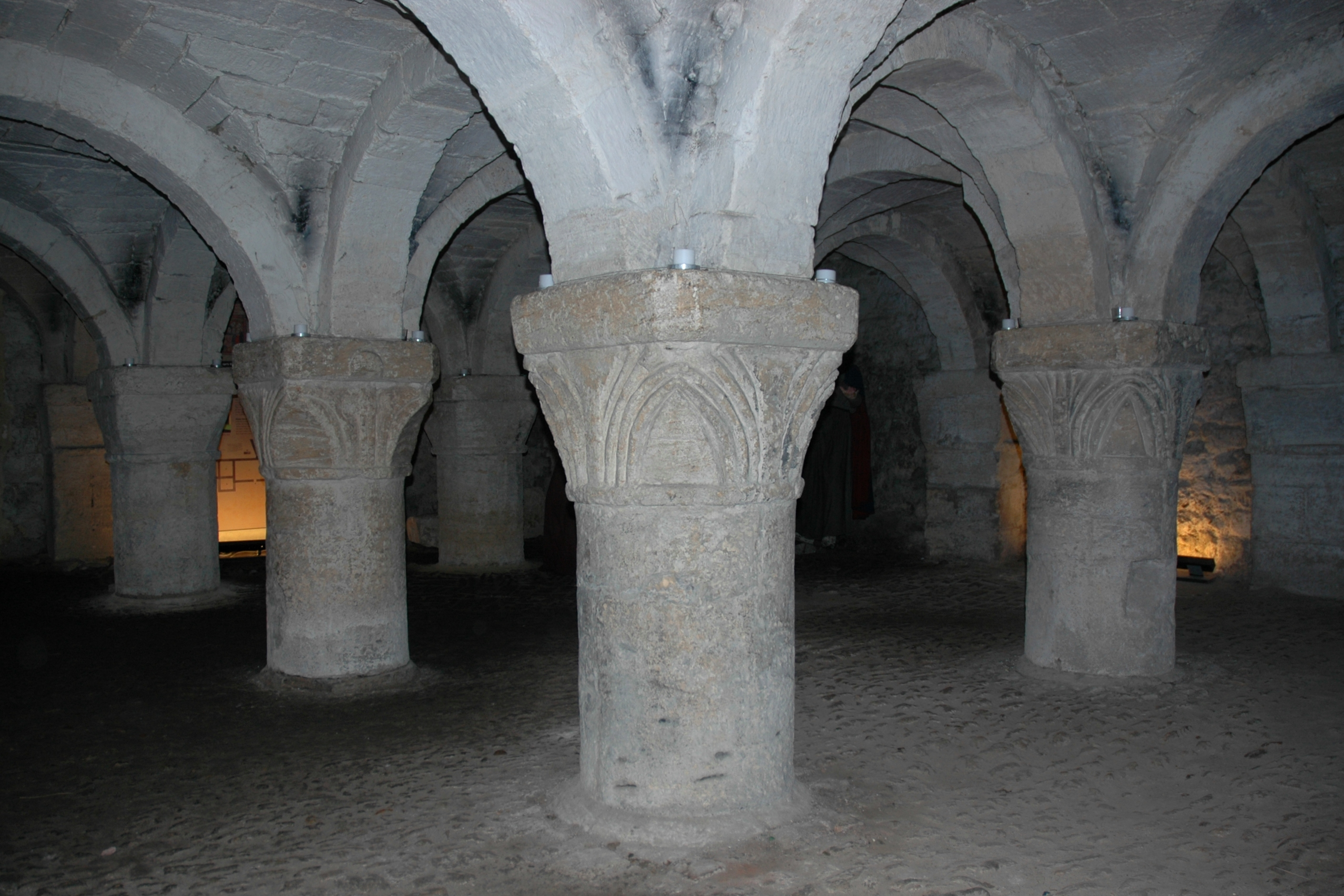
St George's crypt chapel, rebuilt in 1794 re-using its late 11th-century Norman columns and capitals

The prison was closed in 1996 and the site reverted to Oxfordshire County Council. The Oxford Prison buildings have since been redeveloped as a restaurant and heritage complex, with guided tours of the historic buildings and open courtyards for markets and theatrical performances. The complex includes a hotel in the Malmaison chain, Malmaison Oxford, opened 2005, occupying a large part of the former prison blocks, with cells converted as guest rooms. However, those parts of the prison associated with corporal or capital punishment have been converted to offices rather than being used for guests. The mixed-use heritage project, officially opened on 5 May 2006, won the RICS Project of the Year Award 2007.

The full extent of the original castle is somewhat obliterated today, especially with the intrusion of the newer County Hall into the eastern side, while New Road runs over the location of north-east portion of the curtain wall with its two square towers; nevertheless the position of its outer perimeter moat is approximated by portions of New Road, Castle Street and Paradise Street (refer map at right), while the remains of the original Barbican lie underneath the modern Westgate shopping centre. Since 1954 the two oldest parts of the castle have been Grade I listed buildings: the 11th-century motte with its 13th-century well-chamber, the circa 11th-century St George's tower (listed as Norman, but now generally believed to be Saxon), the relocated crypt chapel, and the 18th-century D-wing and Debtors' Tower. The site is protected as a Scheduled Monument. As at 2018, guided tours of the surviving medieval and 18th-century portions are available to visitors via a commercial operator, Heritage Projects (Oxford Castle) Ltd, with opening hours and pricing available via their website.

== See also ==
- Museum of Oxford
- Castles in Great Britain and Ireland
- List of castles in England

== Bibliography ==
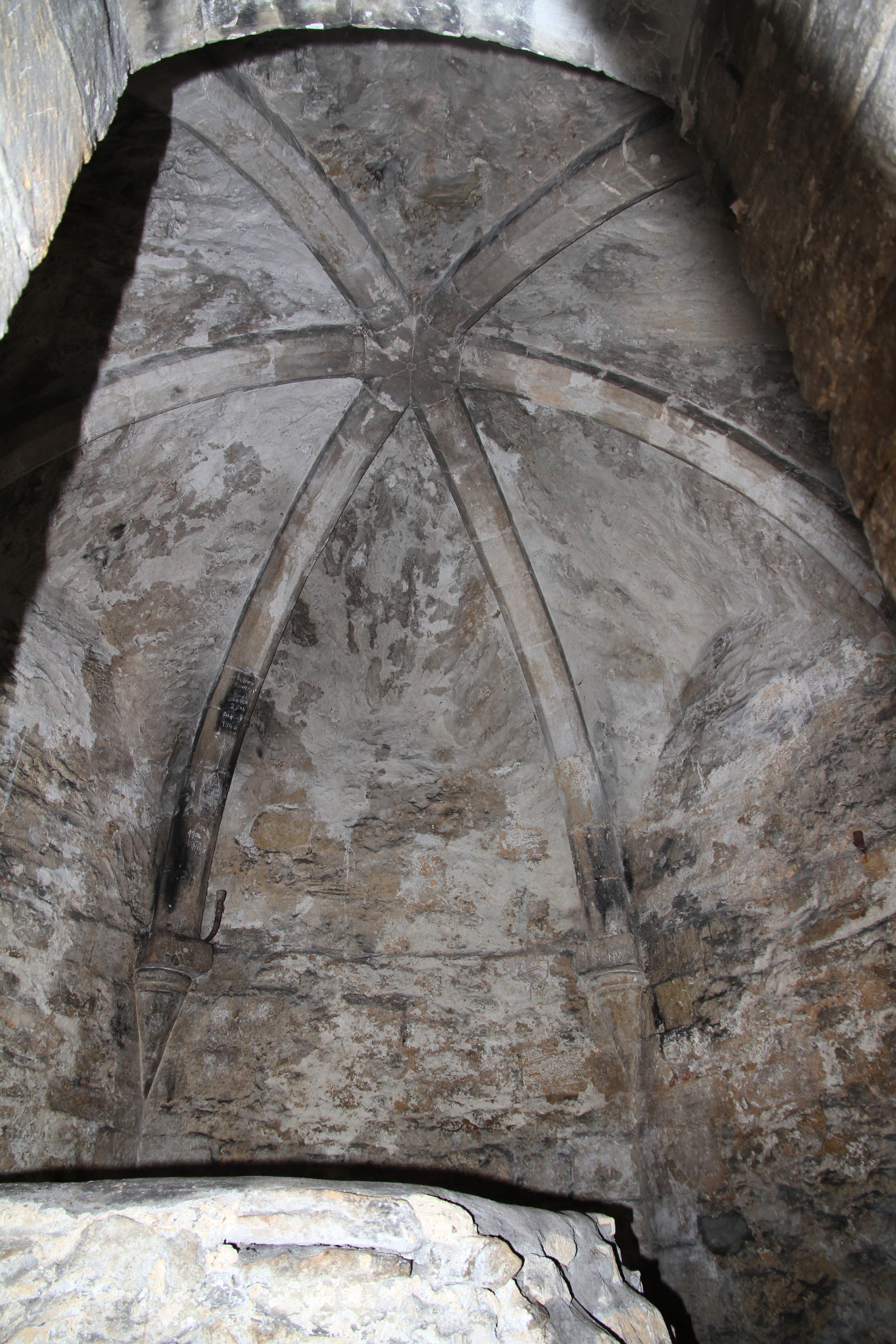
13th-century Early English hexagonal vault of the well-chamber inside the motte

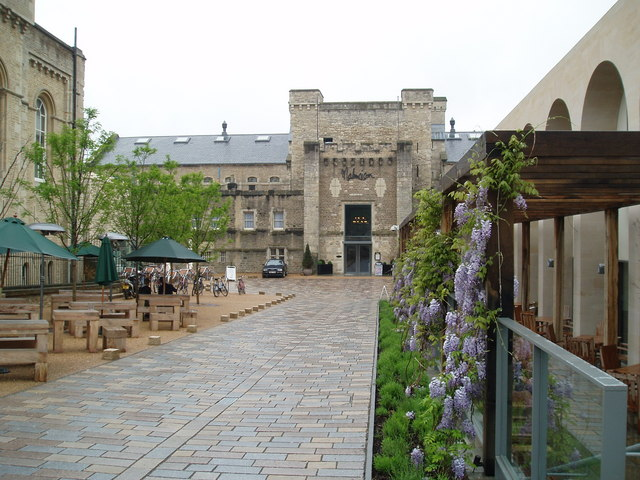
HMP Oxford has been converted into a Malmaison Hotel.

- Amt, Emilie. (1993) The Accession of Henry II in England: Royal Government Restored, 1149-1159. Woodbridge, Boydell Press. ISBN 978-0-85115-348-3.
- Beckley, Ruth and Radford, David (compilers) (2012). "Oxford Archaeological Resource Assessment 2011 - Norman (1066-1205)." https://www.oxford.gov.uk/downloads/file/1624/norman_oxford_1066_-_1205
- Booth, Paul, et al. (2003). "The West Gate of Oxford Castle: Excavations at Boreham's Yard, Tidmarsh Lane, Oxford, 1994-5." Oxoniensia Vol. LXVIII p. 363-422. http://oxoniensia.org/volumes/2003/booth2.pdf
- Creighton, O. H. (2002) Castles and Landscapes: Power, Community and Fortification in Medieval England. London: Equinox. ISBN 978-1-904768-67-8.
- Crossley, Alan and C. Elrington. (eds) (1979) Victoria County History: A History of the County of Oxford, Volume 4: The City of Oxford. OCLC 7534514.
- Davies, Mark. (2001) Stories of Oxford Castle: From Dungeon to Dunghill. Oxford: Oxford Towpath Press. ISBN 0-9535593-3-5.
- Gravett, Christopher and Adam Hook. (2003) Norman Stone Castles: The British Isles, 1066-1216. Botley, Osprey. ISBN 978-1-84176-602-7.
- Harfield, C. G. (1991). "A Hand-list of Castles Recorded in the Domesday Book". English Historical Review. 106 (419): 371–392. doi:10.1093/ehr/CVI.CCCCXIX.371. JSTOR 573107.
- Harrison, Colin. (ed) (1998) John Malchair of Oxford: Artist and Musician. Oxford: Ashmolean Museum. ISBN 978-1-85444-112-6.
- Hassall, T. G. (1971) "Excavations at Oxford," in Oxoniensia, XXXVI (1971).
- Hassall, T. G. (1976) "Excavations at Oxford Castle: 1965-1973," in Oxoniensia, XLI (1976). http://oxoniensia.org/volumes/1976/hassall.pdf
- Jope, E. M. "Late Saxon Pits Under Oxford Castle Mound: Excavations in 1952," in Oxoniensia, XVII-XVIII (1952–1953). http://oxoniensia.org/volumes/1952-3/jope.pdf
- Joy, T. (1831) Oxford Delineated: A sketch of the history and antiquities. Oxford: Whessell & Bartlett. OCLC 23436981.
- Liddiard, Robert (ed). (2003) Anglo-Norman Castles. Woodbridge, Suffolk: Boydell Press. ISBN 0851159044.
- MacKenzie, James Dixon. (1896/2009) The Castles of England: Their Story and Structure. General Books. ISBN 978-1-150-51044-1.
- Marks, Richard. (1993) Stained glass in England during the Middle Ages. London: Routledge. ISBN 978-0-415-03345-9.
- Munby, Julian. (1998) "Malchair and the Oxford Topographical Tradition," in Harrison (ed) 1998.
- Oxford Archaeological Unit (2011). Repairs to the Castle Mill Stream Wall, Paradise Street, Oxford. Client Report to St Peter's College, Oxford.
- Poore, Daniel, Norton, Andrew and Dodd, Anne (2009). Excavations at Oxford Castle: Oxford's Western Quarter from the Mid-Saxon Period to the Late Eighteenth Century (Based on Daniel Poore's Tom Hassall Lecture for 2008). Oxoniensia, LXXIV p. 1-18.
- Smith, Philip. (2008) Punishment and Culture. Chicago: University of Chicago Press. ISBN 978-0-226-76610-2.
- Tyack, Geoffrey. (1998) Oxford: an Architectural Guide. Oxford: Oxford University Press. ISBN 978-0-19-817423-3.
- Whiting, R. C. (1993) Oxford: Studies in the History of a University Town Since 1800. Manchester: Manchester University Press. ISBN 978-0-7190-3057-4.
