= HM Prison Oxford =

Prison in Oxford Castle from 1888 until 1996

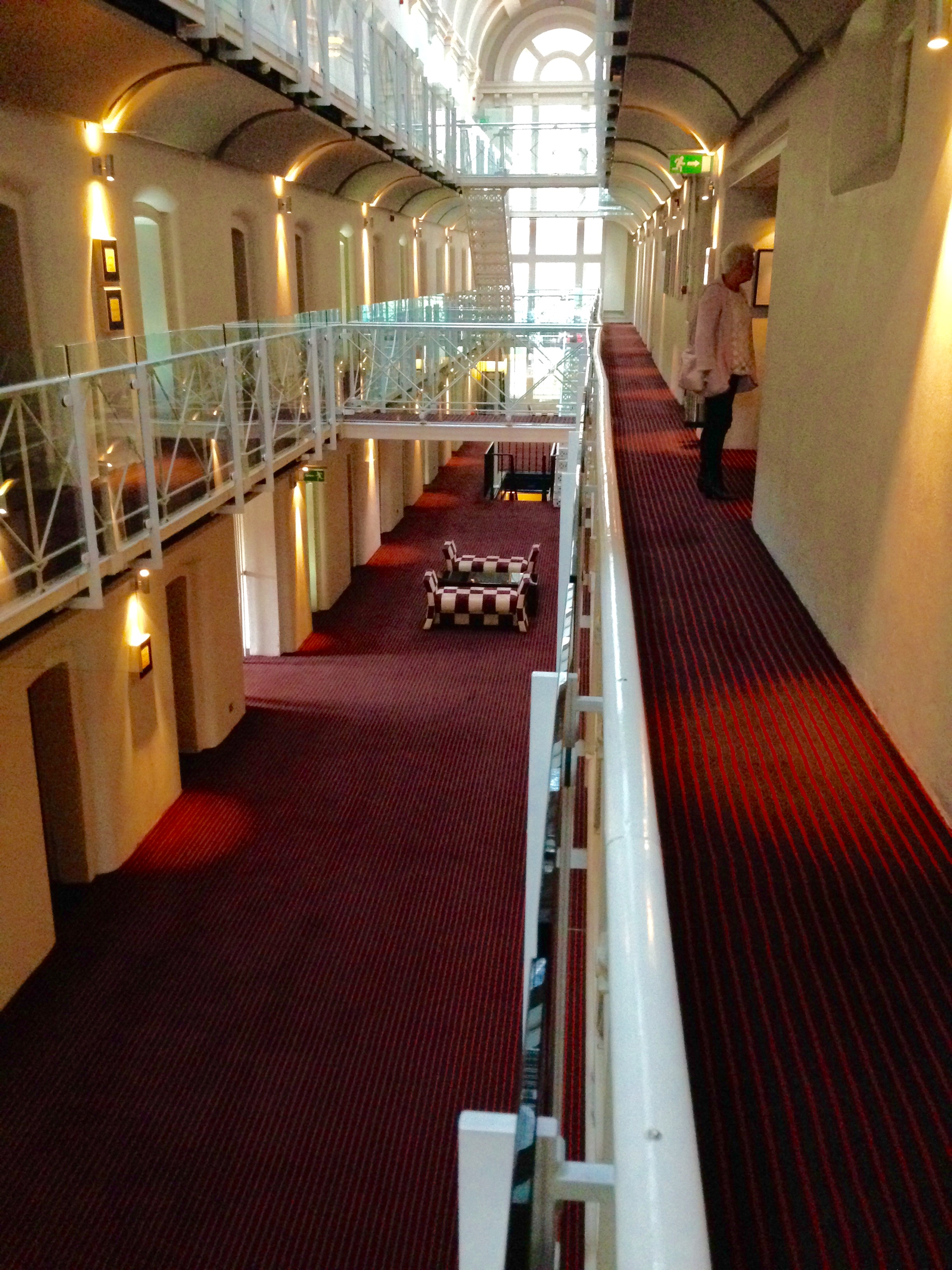
Interior of the former HMP Oxford after being converted into a hotel

HM Prison Oxford was a prison in Oxford Castle from 1888 until 1996. The castle had been used as a prison since the seventeenth century, but it only acquired the name HM Prison Oxford in the 1888 prison reforms.

In August 1972, prisoners staged a rooftop protest as part of the prison strike organised by Preservation of the Rights of Prisoners.

After its closure, the hotel chain Malmaison converted the former prison into a hotel which opened in 2005.
