= Bussy (surname) =

Bussy is a surname. Notable people with the surname include:

- Antoine Bussy (1794–1882), French chemist
- Kessya Bussy (born 2001), French footballer
- Sir John Bussy (?–1399), British Member of Parliament

== See also ==
- Bussey (surname)
- De Bussy
