= George Gibson Bussey =

British inventor

George Gibson Bussey (1829–1889) born in Ripon, Yorkshire, was a prolific inventor and patenter of sports and leisure equipment, including pneumatic rifles, tennis racquets, clay pigeon machines and dining furniture that converted into a billiard table.

He is best known for establishing the London-based sporting goods manufacturer George G. Bussey & Co., whose factory at Rye Lane, Peckham, still stands today.
