= Iowa Child Welfare Research Station =

Child development research center

- Established: 1917
- Research type: Child development, Developmental psychology, Pediatrics
- Location: Iowa City, Iowa
- Affiliations: University of Iowa

The Iowa Child Welfare Research Station attached to the University of Iowa conducted pioneering research into child development and child psychology during the 20th century. German-American psychologist Kurt Zadek Lewin worked there and Robert Richardson Sears directed the station for much of the 1940s. Many other eminent psychologists, physiologists, and researchers were associated with the station and its work.

In 1963 the station was renamed the Institute of Child Behavior and Development due to negative association amongst the public with the phrase "Child Welfare". In 1974 the Institute was closed as a research establishment.

== History ==
The station was founded in 1917. A leader of the Iowa Congress of Mothers (a chapter of the National Congress of Mothers, which later became the Parent-Teacher Association) named Cora Bussey Hillis arranged for the station to be sited at the University of Iowa and procured funding from the state legislature and the Women's Christian Temperance Union. Hillis worked with Carl Emil Seashore, then the head of the psychology department at the University of Iowa, to establish the station. Seashore helped author the following law, which was eventually signed into law in 1917:

Be it enacted by the General Assembly of the State of Iowa:

Section 1. That the state board of education is hereby authorized to establish and maintain at Iowa City as an integral part of the State University, the Iowa Child Welfare Research Station, having as its objects the investigation of the best scientific methods of conserving and developing the normal child, the dissemination of the information acquired by such investigation, and the training of students for work in such fields.

Section 2. That the management and control of such station shall be vested in a director appointed by the said board of education, and an advisory board of seven members to be appointed by the president of the university from the faculty of the graduate college of said university.

Section 3. That there is hereby appropriated out of the money in the state treasury not otherwise appropriated, the sum of twenty-five thousand dollars annually hereafter, for the maintenance of such a station and the furtherance of the objects, to be expended under the direction of said board of education.

— Child-placing in Families

With the exception of a stint of military service during World War I Dr. Bird Thomas Baldwin served as the first director of the station until his death on May 11, 1928.

In 1922 the station listed these employees:

- Director Baldwin
- Paid, full time—4 nurses, 1 social worker, 3 clerical or other helpers.
- Paid, part time—1 physician, 1 nurse, 1 social worker, 3 clerical or other helpers.
- Volunteer, part time—4 physicians.

== Research ==
The Station was the first institution in the world devoted to the study of the "normal child." Among its contributions to this field of knowledge, the Station conducted studies in the normal physical growth rates of children, studies in intellectual development in children and its relation to environment, studies in classroom management techniques that support positive outcomes, and developed collections of data regarding speech development and therapy for children with cerebral palsy. The Station also helped establish research standards for conducting research into child development.

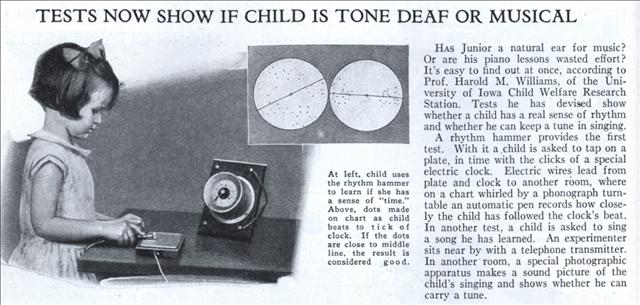
1931 article in Popular Science describing some research conducted at the Station.
