= David Victor Belly de Bussy =

French officer

General David Victor Belly de Bussy (19 March 1768 in Beaurieux – 2 January 1848) was a French officer during the Napoleonic Wars.
