= Cora Bussey Hillis =

American child welfare advocate

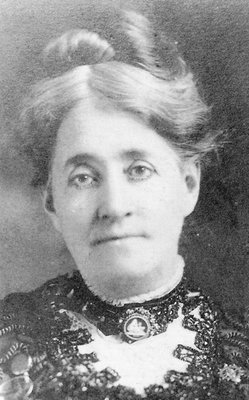
Cora Bussey Hillis, 1858–1924

Cora Bussey Hillis (August 8, 1858 – August 12, 1924) was a child welfare advocate. Her work advanced children's health care, education, and the juvenile justice system in Iowa. She was admitted into the Iowa Women's Hall of Fame in 1976. Hillis Elementary School in Des Moines, Iowa, was named for her.

== Early life ==
Hillis was born on August 8, 1858, in Bloomfield, Iowa. Her parents were Cyrus Bussey, a merchant and Union General in the American Civil War, and Ellen (Kiser) Bussey. The Busseys moved to New Orleans after the war, and Hillis attended Sylvester Larned Institute.

== Public life and career ==
In 1887 Hillis helped found the Des Moines Women's Club, and she raised money for the organization by giving lectures on the fine arts in her home. Hillis first ventured into advocacy work in 1894 when she campaigned to create a safe public swimming facility for children in the Des Moines River, including a bath house and rental swimwear for those who could not afford their own.

After the death of her son Philip in 1893, Hillis became involved in the "mother's congress" movement (later became the Parent-Teacher Association) that promoted an educated approach to parenthood and child-rearing. She attended the 1899 National Mothers' Congress in Washington, D.C., serving as a delegate from the Iowa Child Study Society. Hillis became highly involved in the organization. She organized the next Congress, which took place in Des Moines in May 1900, and she was elected the first president of the Iowa Congress of Mothers. The organization advocated for recognizing the responsibility and commitment of parenthood, and for discarding inaccurate gender stereotypes.

Hillis used the network of the Iowa Congress of Mothers to advocate for other political and social changes that would benefit children and families. She campaigned for the creation of a juvenile court system in Iowa, which at the existed in very few states, and she helped write the legislation that was eventually passed in 1904. She worked to establish a system for tracking infant births and deaths as a way to reduce child mortality. She worked with the newly established Baby Saving Campaign in Des Moines, which included birth registrations, ice and milk distribution, visiting nurses, and the fresh air camp. The camp took place in the Summer of 1913. Hillis raised the funds for it and supervised the camp for a month. The aim of the camp was to provide a respite for young and poor mothers during the hot summer months, as well as to provide education about nutrition, health, and hygiene.

For many years Hillis attempted to convince the State University of Iowa to establish a research unit devoted to child development, which was an area poorly understood at the time. Hillis was inspired in this work by her experiences caring for her invalid sister, Laura, who developed a rare spinal disease when she was two years old. Doctors provided contradictory and insufficient guidance in Laura's case, in part because there was very little research into child development. In 1914, after taking the idea to the four previous presidents of the University, Thomas Macbride agreed to support and move forward with the idea. Together with Carl Seashore, Dean of the Graduate College, Hillis campaigned the state legislature to allocate funds to establish such a center. Finally, in April 1917, the Child's Welfare Bill was signed into law in Iowa. It established the Iowa Child Welfare Research Station (now the Institute of Child Behavior and Development), which researches children's physical growth, intellectual development, speech development, and aspects of teacher training.

== Personal life ==
Cora Bussey met Isaac Hillis, a lawyer, on a family vacation to Keokuk, Iowa, and they married in 1880. They had five children, Ellen, Cyrus, Philip, Isaac, and Doris. The Hillis's also cared for Cora's invalid sister, Laura (Lollie), after the death of her mother in 1881. Her family life was beset by tragedies, and her three youngest children died before reaching adulthood.

Hillis died in a car accident on August 12, 1924, near St. Cloud Minnesota and was buried at Woodland Cemetery (Des Moines, Iowa).
