= Roger de Bussy =

12th-century Anglo-Norman royal official

Roger de Bussy was a medieval Anglo-Norman nobleman during the reigns of King Stephen of England and King Henry II of England.

Roger was the son of William de Bussy, who held lands at Old Wardon in Bedfordshire and William's wife Hawise, the sister of Walter Espec. He had brothers Jordan and William, with William likely the eldest as he was his father's heir, as well as heir to part of the lands of his uncle Walter Espec.

Roger held some lands in Oxfordshire near Steeple Barton, perhaps as a vassal of John de St John. Roger was with King Stephen at Woodstock in 1149, where he was noted as an adherent of the royal party in the civil war between Stephen and his cousin Matilda. He gave lands at Barton in Oxfordshire to Colchester Abbey, the grant of which was confirmed by Stephen.

The Treaty of Wallingford in 1153 noted that Roger had custody of Oxford Castle, and that he had sworn fealty to Duke Henry, who became King Henry II in 1154. Roger's brother Jordan was noted as holding Lincoln Castle and was likewise a vassal of Henry's. In the treaty, both brothers swore to hand over their castles to Henry when Stephen died and Henry inherited the kingdom of England. Both men also handed over hostages, to ensure their fulfillment of the treaty terms. The treaty does not make clear whether or not Roger actually controlled Oxford Castle at the time.

After the accession of King Henry, both Roger and his brother Jordan appear in the royal records as receiving money in 1156 and 1157 from the Sheriff of Yorkshire.
