= Cyrus Bussey =

Union Army General

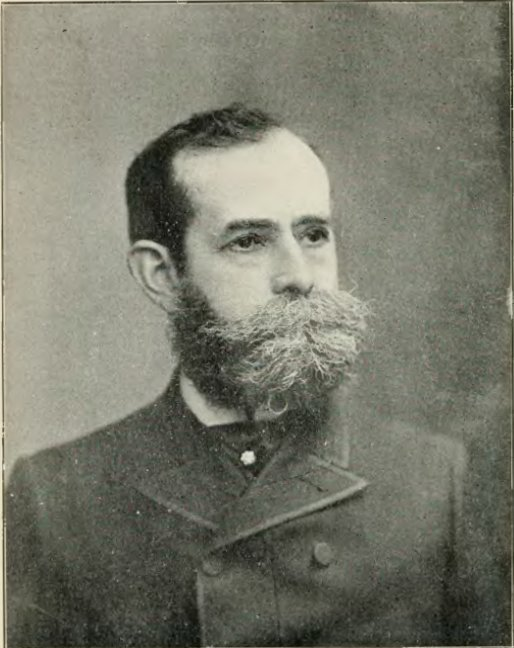
- Born: October 5, 1833; Hubbard, Ohio
- Died: March 2, 1915 (aged 81); Washington, D.C.
- Burial place: Arlington National Cemetery
- Military career
- Allegiance: United States of America; Union
- Branch: United States Army; Union Army
- Service years: 1861–1865
- Rank: Brigadier General; Brevet Major General
- Conflicts: American Civil War

Cyrus Bussey (October 5, 1833 – March 2, 1915) was an American soldier and politician, serving as a brigadier general in the Union Army during the American Civil War.

== Early life and career ==
Bussey was born in Hubbard, Ohio, in 1833. His father, Reverend A. Bussey, was a Methodist minister. He moved with his father, in 1837, to Indiana. At age 14, Bussey began working, as a clerk, in a dry-goods store, and at age 15, he started his own mercantile business. He began studying medicine, at age 18, but realized that he did not want to go into that profession. In 1855, Bussey moved to Davis County, Iowa, and began another business. It was here that his political career would begin.

== Political career ==
He early became interested in politics, entered the Iowa Senate as a Democrat, representing the 3rd District. In 1860, he was a delegate to the Baltimore convention, which nominated Stephen A. Douglas for President.

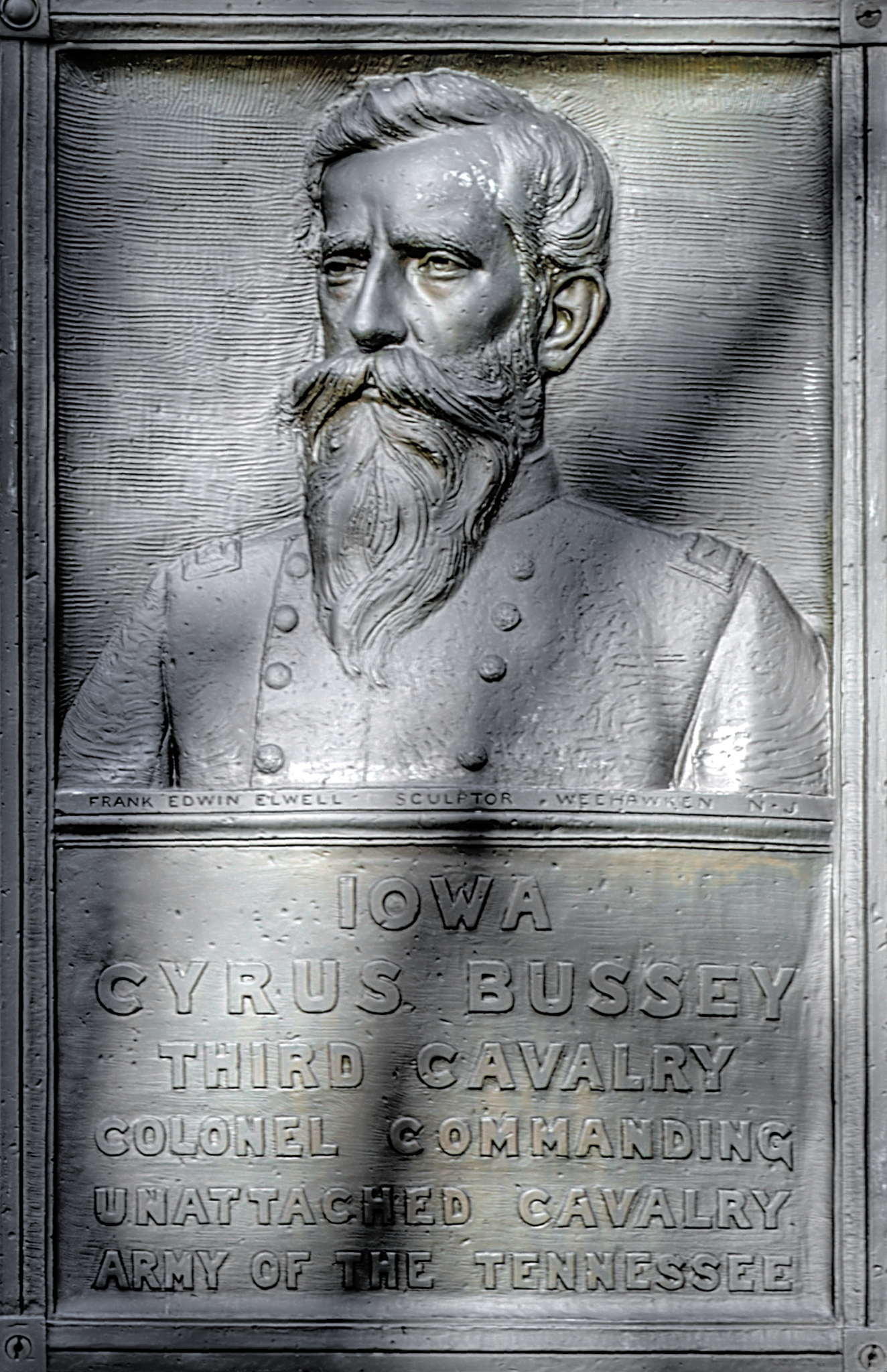
Relief portrait at Vicksburg National Military Park

== American Civil War ==
He served throughout the Civil War, beginning his military career as an Aide-de-Camp to Iowa Governor Samuel J. Kirkwood. He was promoted to colonel and given command of the 3rd Iowa Cavalry Regiment in September 1861, which he led into the Battle of Pea Ridge. In November 1862 he received the command of a cavalry brigade in the Thirteenth Army Corps and was the Chief of Cavalry for Ulysses S. Grant's army during the Vicksburg Campaign. Being promoted to Brigadier General of U.S. Volunteers on January 5, 1864, he was assigned a cavalry brigade in the Seventh Army Corps in the Department of Arkansas. Later in the war he changed the branch and received command of an infantry brigade in the same corps; and when the war ended Bussey commanded the corps´ 3rd Division. He received his final promotion to the rank of Brevet Major General of U.S.V. on March 13, 1865, and was mustered out of the Volunteer Service on August 24, 1865.

== Postbellum career ==
For some time after the war, he carried on a commission business in St. Louis and New Orleans. Bussey was appointed Assistant Secretary of the Interior from 1889 to 1893. Afterwards, he practiced law. He was commander of the District of Columbia Commandery, Military Order of the Loyal Legion of the United States in 1911 and 1912.

== Personal life ==
With his wife, Ellen (Kiser) Bussey, he had two children, Cora and Laura. His oldest daughter, Cora Bussey Hillis, became a notable children's welfare advocate.

Cyrus Bussey died at his home in Washington on March 2, 1915.

== See also ==
- List of American Civil War generals (Union)
