= Robert Walerand =

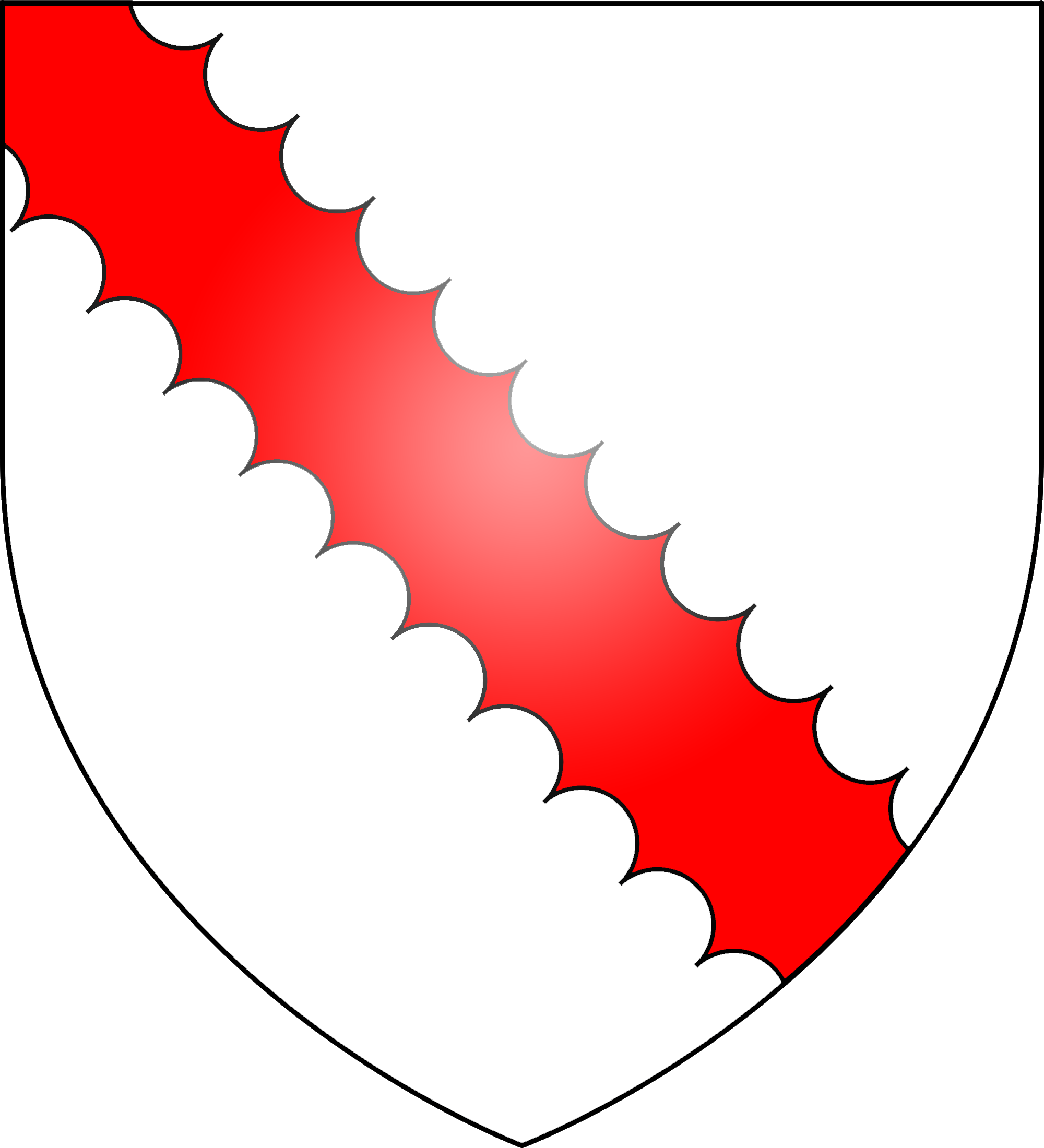
Arms of Robert Walerand: Argent, a bend engrailed gules

Robert Walerand (died 1273), was Justiciar to King Henry III (1216–1272). He was throughout his reign one of the king's familiares. Among the king's household knights he stands in the same position as his friend John Mansel among the royal clerks. Walerand was most notably employed by the king in the ill-fated scheme of raising money from the barons for his second son Edmund to take up the crown of Sicily, offered by the Pope in 1254. His forceful exactions in that connection were one of the causes of the rebellion of Simon de Montfort and the Barons' War, which ended however with royal victory at the Battle of Evesham in 1265. His principal residence was Siston, Gloucestershire.

== Origins ==
Robert Walerand was the son of William Walrond of Whaddon by Isabel de Berkeley, widow of Thomas de Rochford, and later the wife of Josce de Dinan. The daughter of Roger de Berkeley and Hawise, her dower lands included Siston and Coberley. Robert's brother John Walerand, rector of Clent in Worcestershire, was in 1265 appointed seneschal and joint custodian of the Tower of London. His half sister Alice de Rochford (Isabel's daughter by Thomas de Rochford) was the mother of Alan Plugenet who received Kilpeck, and another sister, also named Alice, was abbess of Romsey Abbey.

== Career ==
In 1246 he received the custody of the estates formerly held by the heirs of William Marshal, 1st Earl of Pembroke (d.1219) and in 1247 of those of John de Munchanes (Excerpta e Rot. Fin. i. 458, ii. 14). In Easter 1246 he was appointed Sheriff of Gloucestershire (List of Sheriffs to 1831, p. 49; Dugdale, Baronage, i. 670). He was granted Carmarthen Castle and Cardigan Castle in 1250, together with the lands of Meilgwn ap Meilgwn and the governorship of Lundy Island (Excerpta e Rot. Fin. ii. 87; Michel and Bémont, Rôles Gascons, vol. i. No. 2388). From June 1251 until August 1258 he was a regular justiciar (Excerpta e Rot. Fin. ii. 107–286).

=== Seneschal of Gascony ===
As early as 1252 he was described as "Seneschal of Gascony" (Royal Letters, Henry III, ii. 95), and in 1253 he accompanied King Henry III thither, sailing on 6 August 1253 from Portsmouth and reaching Bordeaux on 15 August. Walerand was present at the siege of Bénauges (Rôles Gascons, vol. i. No. 4222). The affairs of Bergerac seem to have been especially confided to him (ib. Nos. 3773, 4301), and he was one of the deputation sent by Henry III to the men of Gensac on the death of Elie Rudel, lord of Bergerac and Gensac (ib. No. 4301). Throughout the Gascon campaign Walerand steadily rose in Henry's favour. He was one of the most important members of the king's council in Gascony.

=== Negotiates crown of Sicily ===
On King Henry's acceptance for his second son Edmund the crown of Sicily from Pope Innocent IV and Pope Alexander IV, Walerand was in 1255 associated with Peter of Aigueblanche as the king's envoy to carry out the negotiations with the pope (Cal. of Papal Registers, Papal Letters, i. 312). Walerand was an accomplice of Peter's trick of persuading the prelates to entrust them with blank charters, which they wrote-up at Rome, and so compelled the English church to pay nine thousand marks to certain firms of Sienese and Florentine bankers who had advanced money to Alexander on Henry's account ('Ann. Osney' in Annales Monastici, iv. 109, 110; Oxenedes, Chron. p. 203; Cotton, Hist. Angl. p. 135; Matt. Paris, Chron. Majora, v. 511). At the parliament of Westminster on 13 October 1255 Richard of Cornwall bitterly rebuked Walerand and the Bishop of Hereford because they had 'so wickedly urged the king to subvert the kingdom' (Matt. Paris, Chron. Majora, v. 521).

=== Return to England ===
Walerand now resumed his work as judge. In 1256 he was the chief of the justices itinerant at Winchester ('Ann. Winchester' in Ann. Monastici, ii. 96). He was one of a commission of three appointed to investigate the crimes of William de l'Isle, Sheriff of Northampton, in the famous case of 1256 (Matt. Paris, Chron. Majora, v. 577–80). On 12 June 1256 Walerand was associated with Richard, Earl of Gloucester, in an embassy to the princes of Germany (Fœdera, i. 342). About this time he was entrusted with the custody of St Briavel's Castle and manor in the Forest of Dean, Gloucestershire (Dugdale, Baronage, i. 670), and a little later (1256–1257) he was made steward of all forests south of the Trent and governor of Rockingham Castle (ib.). On 20 February 1257 Simon de Montfort and Robert Walerand were empowered to negotiate a peace between France and England (Royal Letters, Henry III, ii. 121; Matt. Paris, Chron. Majora, v. 649, 650, 659).

At the beginning of the troubles between king and barons in 1258 Walerand, though supporting the king, took up a moderate attitude. He witnessed on 2 May the king's consent to a project of reform (Select Charters, p. 381; Fœdera, 370, 371). He was so far trusted by the barons that he was appointed warden of Salisbury Castle under the provisions of Oxford (ib. p. 393). Other preferments followed, some of which must have been given with the consent of the fifteen. In 1259 he became warden of Bristol Castle (Dugdale, i. 670), while a little later he was again created warden of St. Briavel's Castle.

On 9 July 1261 he was appointed Sheriff of Kent, an office he held until 23 September 1262, and at the same time he was made governor of Rochester Castle and of Canterbury Castle (Dugdale, i. 670; List of Sheriffs to 1831, p. 67). On 29 January 1262 Walerand was elected one of a commission of six, of whom three were barons, to appoint sheriffs (Fœdera, i. 415). On 10 March he was made a member of the embassy appointed to negotiate peace with France (Royal Letters, ii. 138; cf. Flores Hist. ii. 423; Matt. Paris, v. 741; Fœdera, i. 385, 386). Later Walerand and his colleagues laid their report before the magnates in London (Flores Hist. ii. 428), and peace was finally made with King Louis (Fœdera, i. 383, 389).

Walerand's diplomatic skill was rewarded. In 1261 he was made warden of the Forest of Dean (Excerpta e Rot. Fin. ii. 358). In 1262 Henry entrusted to him Dover Castle, Marlborough Castle, and Ludgershall Castle (Rishanger, Chron. et Ann., and Trokelowe, Opus Chronicorum, p. 9, in both of which he is called 'Sir E. de Waleran;' Flores Hist. ii. 468; Red Book of Exchequer, ii. 706). He also became warden of the Cinque Ports (Royal Letters, Henry III, ii. 244). During the chancellorship of Walter de Merton in 1262, the great seal was put into the hands of Walerand and Imbert of Munster. In 1263, when Prince Edward committed his robbery of jewels and money upon the New Temple, Walerand was one of his chief helpers ('Ann. Dunstaple' in Ann. Mon. iii. 222).

=== Baronial wars ===
In 1261 discord between King Henry III and the barons was renewed. Walerand, together with John Mansel and Peter II of Savoy, were regarded as the three chief advisers of the king ('Ann. Osney' in Ann. Mon. iv. 128). In 1263 the barons seized Walerand's lands. The king restored them all except Kilpeck Castle (Dugdale, i. 670). Walerand had rendered himself so indispensable that in February 1263 the king excused himself from sending Walerand and Mansel to France, and despatched other envoys instead (Royal Letters, ii. 239; misdated in Fœdera, i. 394). When the barons went to war against Henry III in 1264, Walerand exerted himself on the king's side. After the Battle of Lewes he and Warren of Bassingbourne still held Bristol Castle for the king. They marched to Wallingford Castle, where Richard of Cornwall and Edward were confined, and vigorously attacked the castle in the hope of relieving them, but failed (Rishanger, Chron. de Bello, Camden Soc. p. 40). After the Battle of Evesham he was rewarded by large grants of land (Dugdale, i. 670), including most of the lands of Hugh de Neville (Liber de Antiquis Legibus, pp. lxvi, lxvii). Walerand pronounced the sentence of disinheritance against all who had taken up arms against the king at Evesham ('Ann. Worcester' in Ann. Mon. iv. 455). He and Roger Leybourne induced the Londoners to pay a fine of twenty thousand marks to the king for their transgressions (Liber de Antiquis Legibus, pp. 78, 80, 81). In 1266 Walerand was one of the original six who by the Dictum of Kenilworth were elected to settle the government ('Ann. Waverley' and 'Ann. Dunstaple' in Ann. Mon. ii. 372, iii. 243; Flores Hist. iii. 12).

=== Last years ===
Walerand now devoted himself to affairs in Wales. Holding much land in and near the Welsh Marches, he had necessarily been frequently employed in the Welsh wars, and was constantly consulted as to the treatment of the Welsh (Royal Letters, Henry III, ii. 219, 2 October 1262; Fœdera, i. 339, 340). On 21 February 1267 a commission was issued, empowering him to make a truce for three years with Llywelyn ap Gruffudd, and with Edmund, the king's son, to make peace (Fœdera, i. 472, 473, 474). He then resumed his work as judge, and from April 1268 until August 1271 many records survive detailing assizes to be held before him (Excerpta e Rot. Fin. ii. 441, 468–546; Abbreviatio Placitorum, pp. 181, 182). When Edward went to the Holy Land he placed, on 2 August 1270, the guardianship of his lands in the hands of four, of whom Walerand was one (Fœdera, i. 487). He died in 1273, before the king's return (Ann. Mon. iv. 254). The chronicler describes Walerand as vir strenuus. He had throughout his career been hated as a royal favourite, though respected for his ability and strength. A curious political poem from Cottonian MS. Otho D, viii., quoted in the notes to Rishanger's Chronicon de Bello (Camden Society, p. 145), refers to him thus:

Exhæredati proceres sunt rege jubente
Et male tractati Waleran R. dicta ferente.

== Marriage & succession ==
Walerand married in 1257 Maud Russell (d. 1306–7), the eldest daughter of his neighbour Ralph Russell of Dyrham, which manor adjoined his home of Siston, but left no issue (Dugdale, i. 670; cf. Cal. Geneal. p. 194). His nephew and heir, Robert II Waleran, was an idiot, and never received livery of his lands, some of which passed to his sister's son, Alan Plugenet. Since Robert II Waleran was an idiot, it is not clear why was he allowed to have an Will, also given that Alan Plugenet was holding his guardianship.
