= Fitzhubert =

Fitzhubert is a surname. Notable people with the surname include:

- Ralph Fitzhubert (1045–1086), Anglo-Norman landowner
- Robert Fitzhubert (fl. 1139–1140), Flemish mercenary active in England

== See also ==
- Clevont Fitzhubert, a 1981 album by American jazz musician Oliver Lake
