= Becket controversy =

12th-century dispute between Thomas Becket and Henry II of England

The Becket controversy or Becket dispute was the quarrel between Archbishop of Canterbury Thomas Becket and King Henry II of England from 1163 to 1170. The controversy culminated with Becket's murder in 1170, and was followed by Becket's canonization in 1173 and Henry's public penance at Canterbury in July 1174.

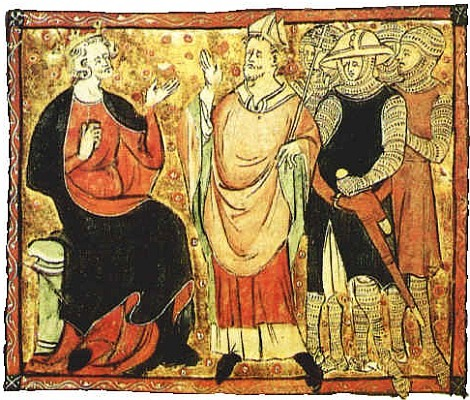
14th-century depiction of Becket with King Henry II

The dispute concerned the respective rights of crown and church. The king attempted to reassert royal prerogatives and the archbishop resisted. A significant point of contention was jurisdiction over criminal cases regarding clerics, even if only in minor orders. The matter dragged on for a number of years as both sides appealed to the pope, who attempted to bring the parties to a negotiated settlement, but to no avail. Both sides resorted to actions that escalated the dispute with the king confiscating property and the archbishop issuing excommunications.

== Background ==
King Henry II appointed his chancellor, Thomas Becket, as Archbishop of Canterbury in 1162. This appointment was made to replace Theobald of Bec, the previous archbishop, who had died in 1161. Henry hoped that by appointing his chancellor, with whom he had very good relations, royal supremacy over the English Church would be reasserted, and royal rights over the Church would return to what they had been in the days of Henry's grandfather, King Henry I of England.

== Start of the dispute ==
However, shortly after Becket's consecration, the new archbishop resigned the chancellorship and changed his entire lifestyle. Previously, Becket had lived ostentatiously, but he now wore a cilice and lived like an ascetic. That said, modern Becket historian Frank Barlow argues that the stories of Becket immediately wearing a hair shirt are later embellishments. He also no longer aided the king in defending royal interests in the church, but instead began to champion ecclesiastical rights.

Although a number of small conflicts contributed to the controversy, the main source of conflict was over what to do with clergy who committed secular crimes. Because even those men who took minor orders were considered clergy, the quarrel over the so-called "criminous clerks" potentially covered up to one-fifth of the male population of England at the time. Becket held the position that all clergy, whether only in minor orders or not, were not to be dealt with by secular powers, and that only the ecclesiastical hierarchy could judge them for crimes, even those that were secular in nature (the benefit of clergy). Henry, however, felt that this position deprived him of the ability to govern effectively, and also undercut law and order in England. Henry held that the laws and customs of England supported his position, and that Theobald of Bec, the previous archbishop, had admitted in 1154 to the papacy that the English custom was to allow secular courts to try clerks accused of crimes.

Among the other issues between the king and the archbishop were the actions Becket took to recover lands lost to the archdiocese, some of which he reacquired with a royal writ that authorized the archbishop to restore any alienated lands. His high-handedness caused many complaints to the king, and added to the dispute. Another disagreement involved Henry's attempts to collect sheriff's aid in 1163. Becket argued that the aid was a free will offering to the sheriffs, and could not be compelled. This culminated in a heated argument at Woodstock, Oxfordshire, in July 1163. Yet another contributing factor was Becket's excommunication of a royal tenant-in-chief who had resisted the archbishop's attempt to install a clerk in a church where the tenant claimed the right to name the appointment. A still later quarrel between the king and Becket resulted in Becket giving way to the king's statement that the custom of England was that no tenant-in-chief could be excommunicated without royal permission.

== Build-up to exile ==
In October 1163, Henry summoned the ecclesiastical hierarchy to Westminster to hear his complaints about the governance of the English Church. At first, the bishops did not agree with the king, who then asked them if they would agree to observe the ancient customs of England. The bishops remained steadfastly behind Becket, and refused to agree to observe the customs if they conflicted with canon law. The council only met for a day, and the next day, the king took his heir, Henry the Young King, out of Becket's custody, as well as confiscating all the honours that he had formerly given to Becket. This was effectively a dismissal of Becket from royal favour.

Over the next year, both sides manoeuvered to gain advantages, working on diplomatic efforts to secure allies. The king, advised by Arnulf of Lisieux, worked on the bishops and managed to swing many of them over to his viewpoint. Both sides petitioned the papacy, and Becket also sent diplomatic feelers to King Louis VII of France and Frederick Barbarossa, the Holy Roman Emperor. The pope, Alexander III, refused to take sides, and urged moderation on both sides. Becket also began to secure possible safe places of refuge on the continent, if he should need to go into exile.

In late January 1164, the king summoned his major barons as well as the bishops to Clarendon Palace for a council. Once it assembled, the king demanded that the bishops and Becket swear to uphold without reservations the customs of the church as they had been in the king's grandfather's reign. At first, Becket refused, but threats and other arguments eventually persuaded him to support the customs, and Becket then ordered the remaining bishops to assent also. The king then proposed to have a committee of barons and clerks compile these customs into a written document, which would be presented to the council. This was done, but in the middle of the recitation of the customs, Becket asked for a postponement in order for him to consult with others about the customs. He verbally assented to uphold the ancient customs, and the other bishops reluctantly did the same. The king demanded the bishops affix their personal seals to a written parchment of the Constitutions of Clarendon, which was then produced. Becket refused, stating that he promised to observe the customs but not give them this ultimate sanction. He said he needed to consult with the Pope before taking such a step.

In August 1164, Becket attempted to go to France without permission, which was forbidden by the Constitutions. He was caught, and then tried on 6 October 1164 at a royal court on different charges of failing to adequately address a suit brought against him by nobleman John Marshal about lands that Becket had confiscated. Once at the council, Becket was found guilty of ignoring the court summons and under pressure from the bishops, accepted the sentence of confiscation of all non-landed property pending the pleasure of the king. However, the original dispute over John Marshal's lands was decided in the archbishop's favour. The king then brought further charges and asked for an accounting of Becket's spending while the archbishop had been chancellor. Another charge was that he was not fulfilling his oath to observe the Constitutions. Becket replied that he was not prepared to answer those charges and was eventually found guilty of both. The archbishop refused to accept the sentence, and fled Northampton and took sanctuary.

== Exile ==
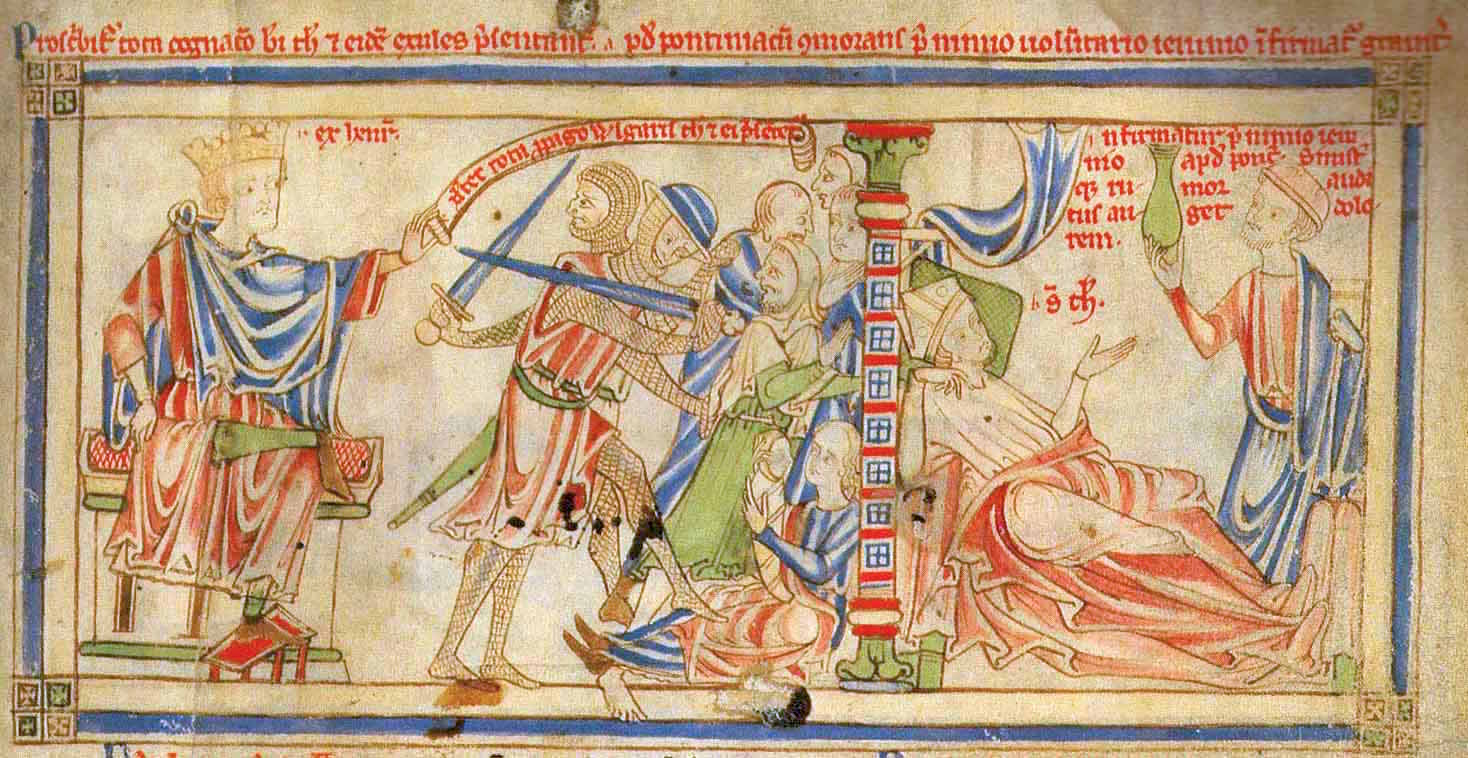
1165: Henry exiles Becket's family and servants; Becket lies sick at Pontigny Abbey, after excessive fasting. A page from the Becket Leaves, four surviving leaves from the 13th-century Vie de Seint Thomas de Cantorbéry, written in French verse.

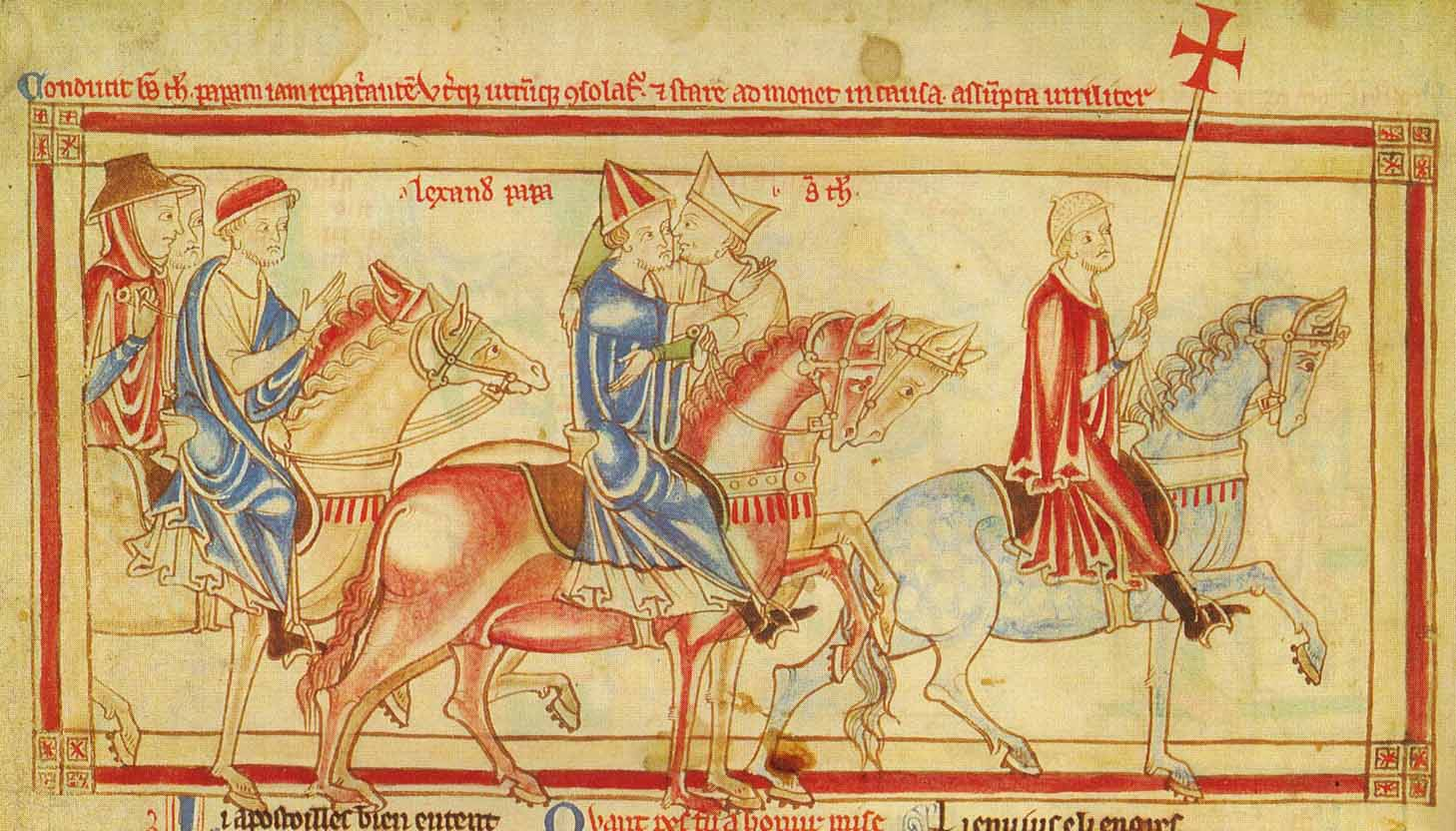
1165: Becket takes his leave of Pope Alexander III, who is returning from France to Rome. Becket Leaves, folio 1v.

Thomas took a ship to the continent on 2 November 1164, eventually reaching a resting spot at Sens, where both sides presented their cases to Alexander. Although Becket was not ordered back to England as the king's envoys requested, neither was the king ordered to back down. Instead, Becket went into exile at Pontigny. Afterward, the king confiscated all the benefices of the archbishop's clerks, who had accompanied him into exile. The king also ordered the exile of Becket's family and servants.

While in exile, Becket engaged in letter writing, writing to many English noblemen and bishops. He engaged in a series of letter exchanges with Gilbert Foliot, the Bishop of London, who was also the recipient of letters from the pope. Becket continued to attempt to resolve the dispute, but Alexander ordered the archbishop to refrain from provoking the king before spring 1166. Meanwhile, Henry had delegated much of the everyday business of the English Church to Foliot, who although supportive of the king was no compliant supplicant, and was known as a supporter of papal positions. Neither Foliot nor Henry had any great desire to settle with Becket quickly.

In late spring 1166, Becket began to threaten the king with ecclesiastical punishments if he did not settle with him. Henry ignored the initial warning letters, but Becket's position was strengthened by the grant to Becket of the status of a papal legate to England, dated on 2 May 1166. On Whitsun 1166, Becket excommunicated a number of Henry's advisers and clerical servants, including John of Oxford, Richard of Ilchester, Richard de Lucy, and Jocelin de Balliol, among others. A bishop was also excommunicated, Josceline de Bohon, the Bishop of Salisbury.

The king and Foliot responded to these actions with the summoning of a council that was held at London around 24 June 1166. The council sent letters both to the pope and to Becket, appealing against the excommunications. After the dispatch of these letters, letters from the archbishop were delivered to Foliot, ordering him to publicize Becket's decisions, and disallowing any appeal to the papacy against the archbishop's sentences. Foliot and the bishops then once again sent letters to the papacy, probably from Northampton on 6 July. A more concrete effort was the appeal of the king to the Cistercian Order's general convocation in 1166, protesting at the aid the Cistercian monasteries of Pontigny, Cercamp and Rigny had given to Becket and threatening to expel the order from Henry's lands. Although the Order did not exactly expel Becket from Pontigny, a delegation of Cistercians did meet Becket, pointing out that while they would not throw him out, they felt sure that he would not wish to bring harm to the Order. Becket then secured aid from the king of France, who offered a sanctuary at Sens.

In December 1166, Alexander wrote to the English bishops that he was sending papal legates a latere to England to hear the various cases. Although later writers on both sides of the controversy claimed that there was to be no appeal from the legates' decisions, nowhere in the documents announcing their appointment was any such limitation mentioned. Alexander wrote two letters, one to each of the main combatants. The letter to the king stressed that the pope had forbidden the archbishop from escalating the dispute until the legates had decided the issues, and that the legates were to absolve the excommunicated once they arrived in England. The letter to the archbishop stressed that the pope had begged the king to restore Becket to Canterbury, and advised the archbishop to restrain himself from hostile moves. Meanwhile, John of Oxford had returned to England from a mission to Rome, and was proclaiming that the legates were to depose Becket, and supposedly showed papal letters confirming this to Foliot. The pope wrote to the papal legates complaining that John of Oxford's actions had harmed the pope's reputation, but never claimed that John of Oxford was lying.

For the next four years, papal legates were dispatched to try to bring the dispute to a negotiated conclusion. Neither Becket nor Henry were disposed to settle, and the pope needed Henry's support too much to rule against him, as the pope was engaged in a protracted dispute with the German emperor, and needed English support.

In November 1167 Foliot was summoned to Normandy, then ruled by Henry II, to meet papal legates and the king. Roger of York, Hilary of Chichester, and Roger of Worcester were also summoned to attend. After some discussion and argument, Henry appears to have agreed that the legates could judge both the king's case against Becket and as the bishops' case. Henry also offered a compromise on the subject of the Constitutions of Clarendon, that the legates accepted. However, when the legates met Becket on 18 November, it quickly became apparent that Becket would not accept negotiations with the king nor accept the legates as judges of either case against him. As the legates had no mandate to compel Becket to accept them as judges, the negotiations came to an end with the king and bishops still appealing to the papacy.

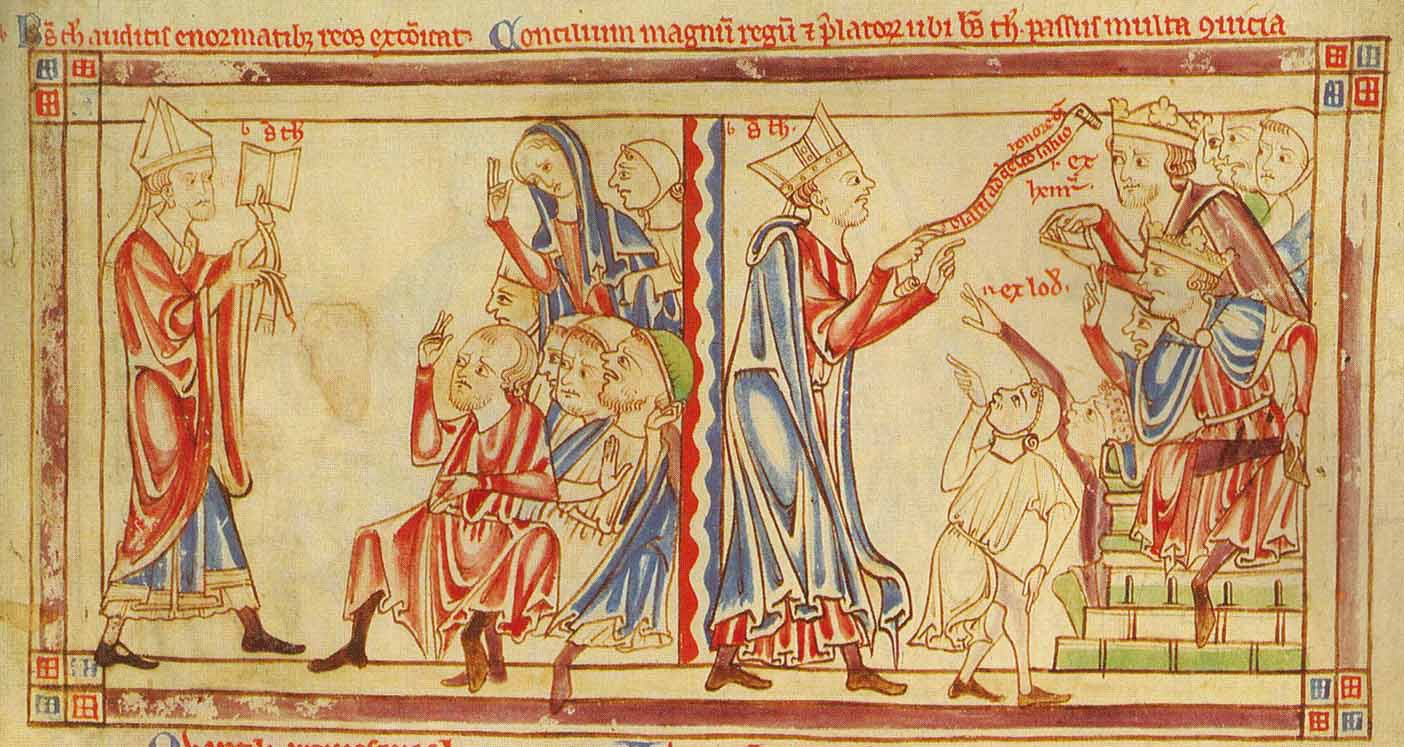
1169: Becket excommunicates his enemies; he submits to Henry II and Louis VII of France at Montmirail. Becket Leaves, folio 2r.

On 13 April 1169, Becket excommunicated Foliot, along with Hugh, Earl of Norfolk, Josceline of Salisbury, and seven royal officials. Becket did this even though none of them had been warned, and despite the fact that the pope had asked that Becket not make any such sentences until after a pending embassy to King Henry had ended. Becket also warned a number of others that unless they made amends to him, they too would be excommunicated on 29 May, Ascension Day. In his excommunication, Becket called Foliot "that wolf in sheep's clothing". Although Foliot tried to enlist the help of his fellow bishops in an appeal, they were less than helpful. Foliot then prepared to appeal his sentence to the pope in person, and travelled to Normandy in late June or early July, where he met the king, but proceeded no further towards Rome, as the papacy was attempting once more to secure a negotiated settlement. In late August and early September serious but ultimately fruitless negotiations took place between the king and the archbishop.

Foliot then proceeded to Rome, but at Milan he received word that his envoy at the papal court had secured the right for him to be absolved by the Archbishop of Rouen, Rotrou. Foliot then returned to Rouen, where he was absolved on 5 April and reinstated in his see on 1 May. The only requirement of this absolution was that Foliot accept a penance to be imposed by the pope. Much of Foliot's objections to Becket's excommunication stemmed from the lack of warning that Foliot and the others had received, contrary to the customary and normal procedures. Becket and his supporters pointed out that there were some situations in which it was possible to excommunicate without warning, but Foliot claimed that the present situation was not one of them. According to Foliot, Becket's habit was "to condemn first, judge second". Foliot's example of appealing excommunications to the papacy was an important step in the setting up of an appeal process for excommunication during the 12th century.

== End of the dispute and Becket's death ==
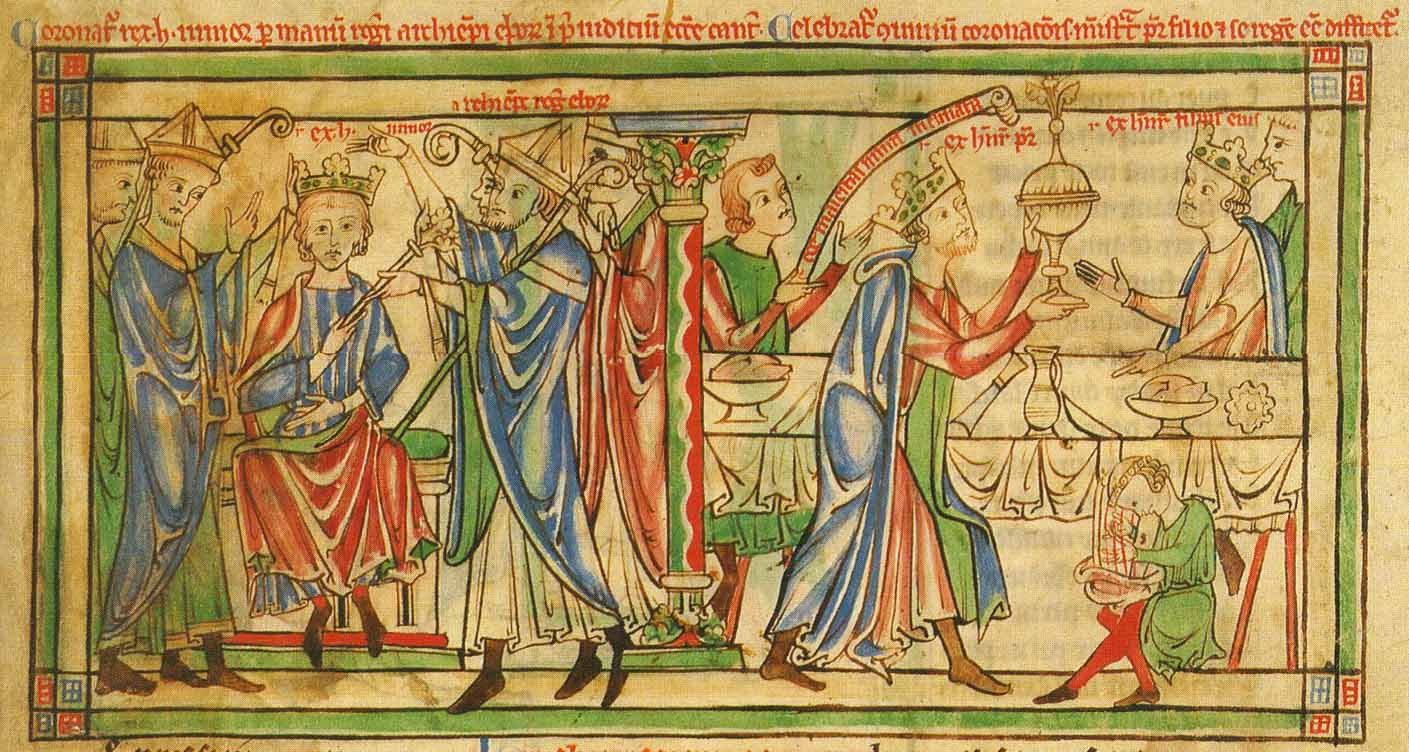
1170: Coronation of Prince Henry and the grand banquet that followed. Becket Leaves, folio 3r.

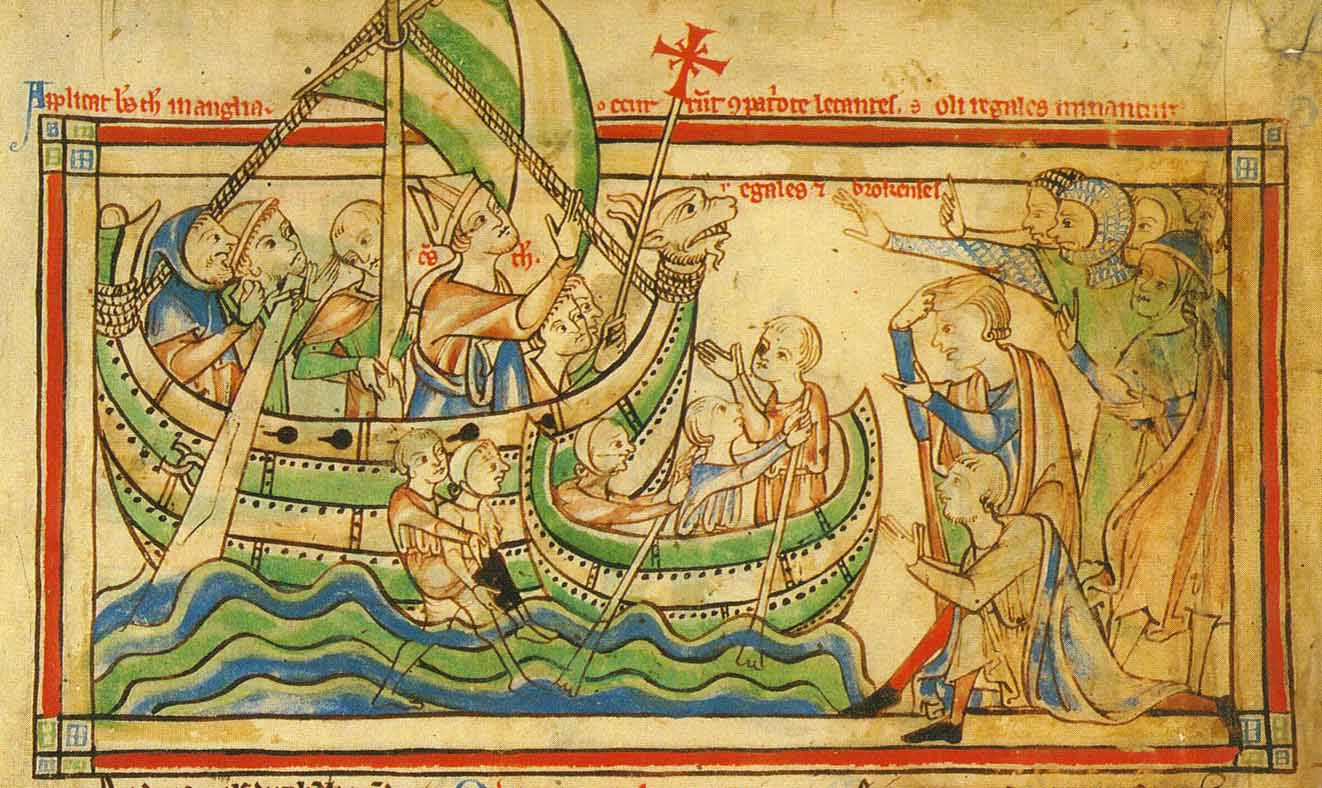
1170: Becket returns to England. He is welcomed by the ordinary people, but the king's men threaten him. Becket Leaves, folio 4v.

On 14 June 1170, Henry's son, Henry the Young King, was crowned junior King of England by the Archbishop of York, which infringed on the right of Becket as Archbishop of Canterbury to crown English monarchs. Although there is no definitive evidence that Foliot assisted in the coronation, it appears likely that he did so. The coronation drove the pope to allow Becket to lay an interdict on England as punishment, and the threat of an interdict forced Henry to negotiate with Becket in July 1170. Becket and the king came to terms on 22 July 1170, allowing the archbishop to return to England, which he did in early December. However, shortly before he landed in England, he excommunicated Roger of York, Josceline of Salisbury, and Foliot.

One possible reason for the excommunications was that the three ecclesiastics had electors from the various vacant bishoprics with them, and were escorting those electors to the king on the continent in order to reward a number of royal clerks with the long vacant bishoprics. Included among those royal clerks were some of Becket's most bitter foes during his exile.

Although Becket offered to absolve Josceline and Foliot, he argued that only the pope could absolve Roger, as he was an archbishop. Roger persuaded the other two to appeal to the king, then in Normandy. When they did so, the royal anger at the timing of the excommunications was such that it led to Henry uttering the question often attributed to him: "Will no one rid me of this turbulent priest?".

This inspired four knights to set off from the king's court in Normandy to Canterbury, where on 29 December 1170, they murdered Becket.

== Effects of the dispute ==
For the ten years that the dispute ran, Henry was unable to appoint any new bishops in England to replace those who had died. It was only in 1173 that new bishops were finally appointed.

== Aftermath ==
In May 1172, Henry negotiated a settlement with the papacy, the Compromise of Avranches, in which the king swore to go on crusade as well as allow appeals to the papacy in Rome. He also agreed to eliminate all customs to which the Church objected. In return, the king managed to secure good relations with the papacy at a time when he faced rebellions from his sons.

After Becket's death, his sentences of excommunication were confirmed, as well as the suspensions from ecclesiastical office. The pope in his confirmation referred to Roger of York, Foliot, and Josceline of Salisbury as the "Gilbertine trinity". The excommunication was absolved for Foliot on 1 August 1171, but he remained suspended from office. He secured his restoration to office on 1 May 1172, after clearing himself of any involvement in Becket's murder.

The king performed a public act of penance on 12 July 1174 at Canterbury, when he publicly confessed his sins, and then allowed each bishop present, including Foliot, to give him five blows from a rod, then each of the 80 monks of Canterbury Cathedral gave the king three blows. The king then offered gifts to Becket's shrine and spent a vigil at Becket's tomb.

== Legacy ==
Although little actually changed from the position that Henry took early in the dispute – he was still able to appoint his own choices as bishops, as well as enjoying many of the rights King Henry I had enjoyed in the Church – the controversy was one of a number of similar disputes between the papacy and secular governments in the 12th century.

== See also ==
- Becket (1964 film)
