= Ludgershall Castle =

Castle in Ludgershall, Wiltshire, England, UK

- Ludgershall, Wiltshire, England
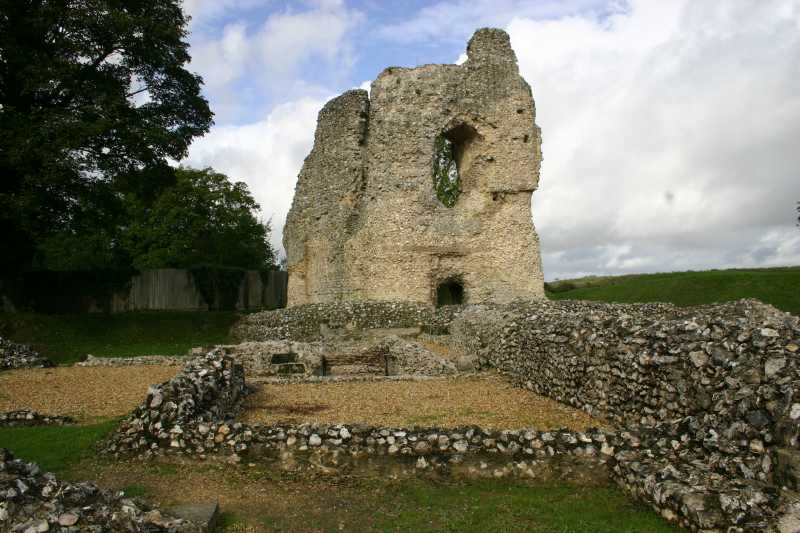
- Remains of Ludgershall Castle

Site information
- Owner: English Heritage
- Open to the public: Yes
- Condition: Ruins and earthworks remain

Location
- Wiltshire
- Coordinates: 51.2596°N 1.6233°W

Site history
- Materials: Stone

Ludgershall Castle is a ruined 12th-century fortified royal residence at Ludgershall in Wiltshire, England. Three large walls still remain of the castle, which was turned into a hunting lodge by Henry III and fell into disuse by the 15th century. The ruin was listed as a scheduled monument in 1981.

== History ==
A motte-and-bailey castle was probably first built in the late 11th century by Edward of Salisbury, Sheriff of Wiltshire. By about 1100 it had come into the possession of the Crown, and John the Marshal (c. 1105–1165) is recorded as the king's castellan. He strengthened it and may have added the northern enclosure, which contained the important buildings, largely in stone, including a great hall and a tower with royal living quarters. The southern enclosure was the bailey, where there were stables, kitchens, and timber farm buildings.

It is likely that John's son, William Marshal, inherited the castle but by 1174–75 it was under royal control. The change of ownership may have been a consequence of William siding against Henry II in the Revolt of 1173–74. Part of the castle was demolished at this point, and may have been on the orders of Henry II.

King John improved the castle as a hunting lodge in 1210, and Henry III made improvements to the castle between 1234 and 1251, such as the addition of the great hall in 1244; he visited the castle at least 21 times.

The castle was used less and less frequently in the 14th and 15th centuries, and by the 1540s most of its ruins had been demolished. The site was levelled to form a garden, with the surviving 12th-century tower kept as a garden feature.

Ludgershall was a more important place in medieval England than it is now, and was able to send two members to Parliament, a privilege it kept until the Reform Act 1832.

The first excavations at the castle took place from 1964 and 1972 under the auspices of Peter Addyman of the University of Southampton. The ruin was listed as a scheduled monument in 1981.

== Layout ==
Extensive earthworks remain, although a private house stands on part of the site. The earthworks have been greatly altered by quarrying. The southern enclosure, which lies within them and at the opposite end of the site from the standing walls, is thought to have been an Iron Age stronghold.

== See also ==
- Castles in Great Britain and Ireland
- List of castles in England
- Marlborough Castle – Medieval castle in Wiltshire, England
