= Canterbury Castle =

Norman Castle in Kent, England

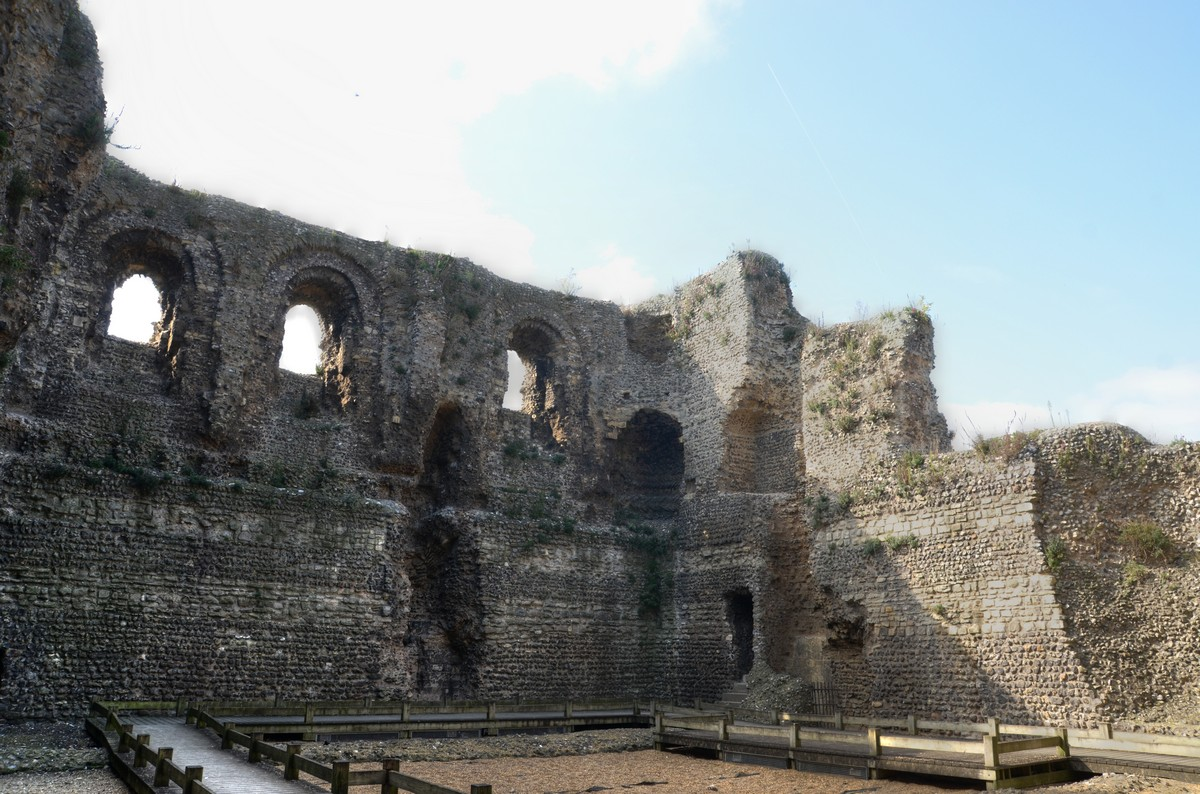
- The interior of Canterbury Castle

- Location within Kent

General information
- Location: Canterbury, Kent, England
- Coordinates: 51.275686°N 1.074618°E

Listed Building – Grade I
- Official name: Canterbury Castle
- Designated: 3 December 1949
- Reference no.: 1252100

Scheduled monument
- Official name: Canterbury Castle
- Designated: 8 April 1915
- Reference no.: 1005194

Canterbury Castle is a ruined Norman castle in Canterbury, Kent, England (grid reference TR14545743). It is a five-minute walk from Canterbury East Station and the main bus station around City Wall.

Canterbury Castle was one of the three original Royal castles of Kent (the other two being Rochester Castle and Dover Castle). They were built soon after the Battle of Hastings, on the main Roman road from Dover to London. This was the route taken by William the Conqueror in October 1066; the castles were probably built to guard this important road.

== Phases ==
=== Norman era ===
A wooden motte and bailey castle was erected in 1066 - its motte may be the mound which is still visible in the Dane John gardens near the stone castle (which may, in turn, be a Roman burial mound), with Dane John deriving from donjon.

=== Stone castle ===
The great stone keep was largely constructed in the reign of Henry I as one of three Royal castles in Kent. This massive structure, which has dimensions of about 98 by 85 feet externally at the base, was originally probably at least 80 feet high. It is mainly made of flint and sandstone rubble. By the 13th century, the castle had become the county jail. It was given up to the invading French in the First Barons' War. In 1380 a new gate was built.

By the 19th century, it had been obtained by a gas company and used as a storage centre for gas for many years, during which time the top floor was destroyed.

=== Tourist attraction ===
The Castle has been owned by the local authority since 1928. It has been closed because of falling masonry since 2018.

Canterbury Council was successful in securing a Levelling Up fund of £19.9m in 2023 for regeneration and cultural investment in restoration of historic sites, including the Castle. Work on the restoration was delayed by a bat roosting but work will begin in 2025 for one year.

== Images of Canterbury Castle ==
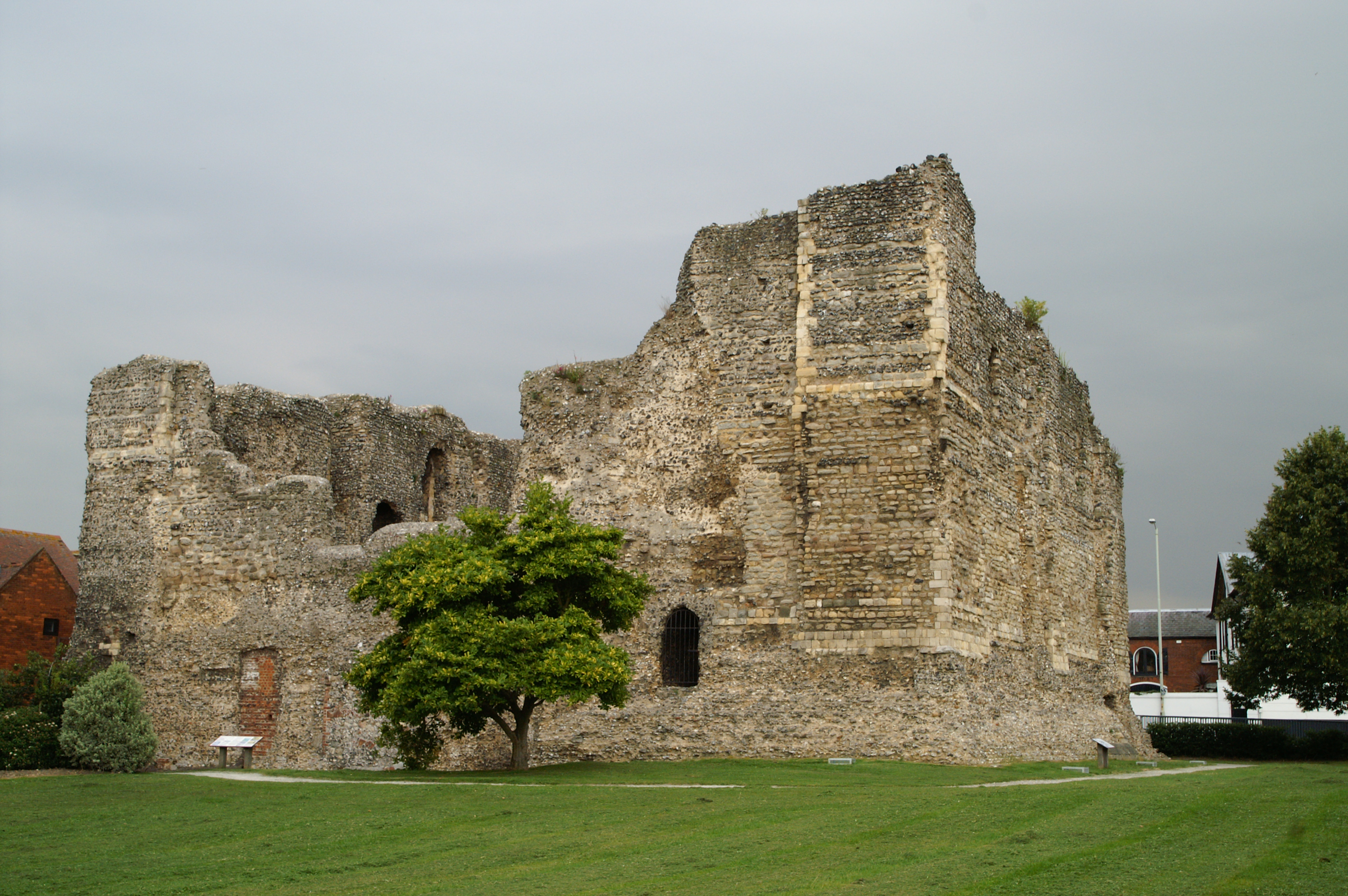
Canterbury Castle, built between 1100 and 1135.

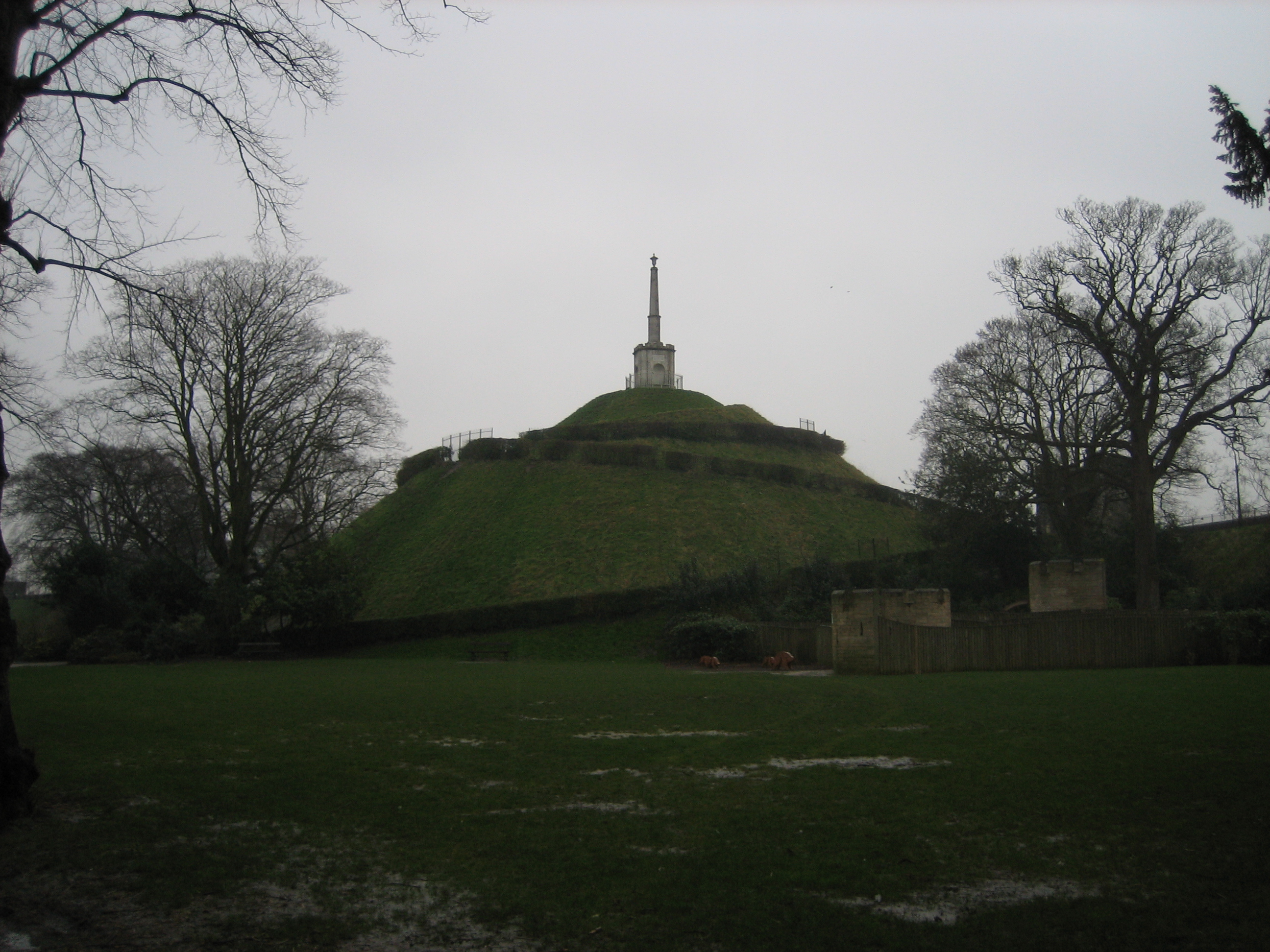
The mound in Dane John gardens - a probable motte

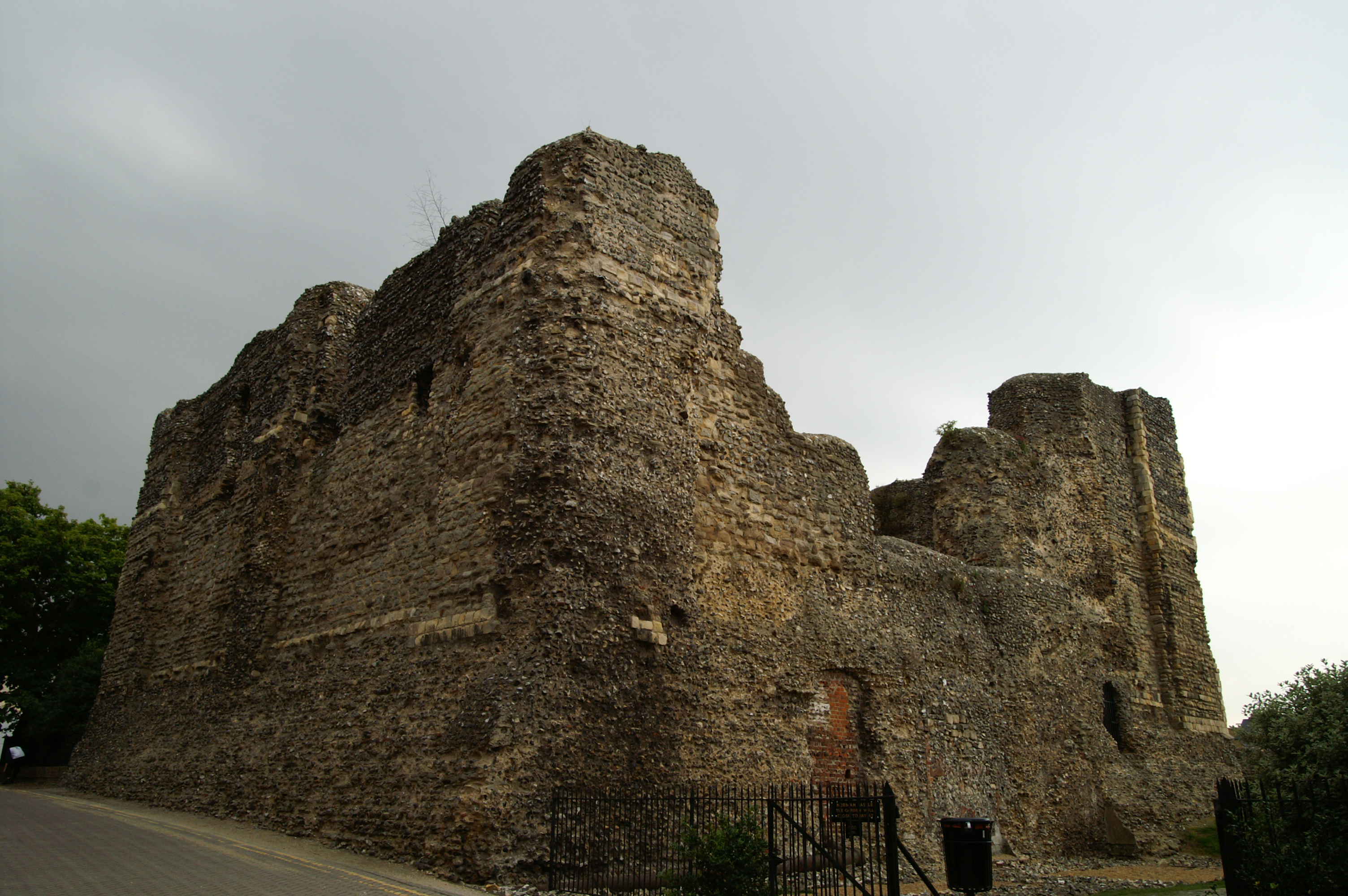
Canterbury Castle

== Governors of Canterbury Castle ==
The Governors were responsible for the upkeep and security of the castle, which passed into private hands at the end of the reign of King James VI and I (1625).

- 1216–1232: Hubert de Burgh, 1st Earl of Kent (also Governor of Dover and Rochester Castles)
- 1232–: Stephen de Segrave (also Governor of Rochester Castle)
- 1259–: Nicholas de Moels (also Governor of Rochester Castle)
- 1261–: Robert Walerand (also Governor of Rochester Castle)
- 1272–: William de Eschetesford
- From the late 13th century onwards the castle was used as a jail
