= Robert Fitzhubert =

Flemish mercenary (fl. 1140)

- Died: 1140; Devizes, Wiltshire, England
- Occupation: Mercenary
- Known for: Participation in The Anarchy

Robert Fitzhubert (fl. 1139–1140) was a mercenary.

He is first mentioned in 1139. His origin is not known, but he is spoken of as a kinsman of William of Ypres, and as one of those Flemish mercenaries who had flocked to England at King Stephen's call. These mercenaries were often perceived in a negative light. Gervase of Canterbury, writing in the 1190s, called the Flemish mercenaries 'hungry wolves' for their behaviour in England during Stephen's reign.

Robert fought for the Earl of Gloucester against the king.

== Malmesbury Castle ==
On 7 October 1139 he surprised by night Malmesbury Castle, which the king had seized from the Bishop of Salisbury a few months before, and burnt the village. The royal garrison of the castle fled for refuge to the abbey, but Robert soon pursued them. Entering the chapter-house at the head of his followers, he demanded that the fugitives should be handed over. The terrified monks with difficulty induced him to be content with the surrender of their horses instead.

Having taken Malemesbury, Robert was plundering far and wide when Stephen, on his way to attack Trowbridge, heard of his deeds, and, turning aside, laid siege to the castle. At the close of a week, William prevailed on Robert to surrender, and within a fortnight of his surprising the castle he had lost it and had set out to join the Earl of Gloucester.

== Marlborough Castle ==
After five months in the Earl's service he left him secretly, and on the night of 26 March 1140 surprised and captured by escalade the famous Devizes Castle, then held for the king. The keep resisted for four days, but then fell into his hands. The Earl of Gloucester sent his son to receive the castle from Robert but the mercenary scornfully turned him away from the gate, exclaiming that he had captured the castle for himself. He now boasted that he would be master by its means of all the country from Winchester to London, and would send for troops from Flanders.

Robert then invited John Marshal, castellan of Marlborough, to join him in his schemes. Marshal was also on the side of the Earl and Empress Matilda's claim to the throne. Initially, he seemed to receive Robert's ideas well and invited him to Marlborough Castle. However, on arrival he ordered the gates slammed shut and thereby captured Robert and a handful of his men.

The Earl of Gloucester, on hearing of this, hastened at once to Marlborough, and at length by bribes and promises obtained possession of Robert. The Earl took his new prisoner to Devizes. There, according to the practice of the time, he demanded that the garrison surrender the castle or Robert would be hanged. The garrison pleaded that they had sworn oaths to Robert that they were never to surrender, and so they declined. Two of Robert's nephews were then hanged, and at last Robert himself. The castle was subsequently sold by the garrison to the king.
