= John Marshal (died 1165) =

Anglo-Norman nobleman

John Marshal (also referred to as John FitzGilbert, c. 1105 - d. 22 July 1165) was a minor nobleman of Anglo-Norman origins who served as marshal of England and fought in the 12th-century civil war on the side of Empress Matilda. He is best remembered as the father of William Marshal.

== Biography ==
=== Early life and appointment ===
John was the son of Gilbert Giffard, who held the position of marshal under King Henry I and maybe under King William Rufus. He inherited his father's title sometime before 1130. In that year, but as stated probably starting earlier, he is described himself as a marshal under Henry. Following Henry's death in 1135, John swore fealty to King Stephen and was granted the castles of Marlborough and Ludgershall, Wiltshire during this time. Along with Hamstead Marshal, this gave him control of the valley of the River Kennet in Wiltshire. He also held lands in Somerset and Berkshire, and owned some buildings in Winchester. In 1130, his total lands were assessed, for the purpose of a tax exemption, as 35 hides and 1/4.

=== Civil war and other conflicts ===
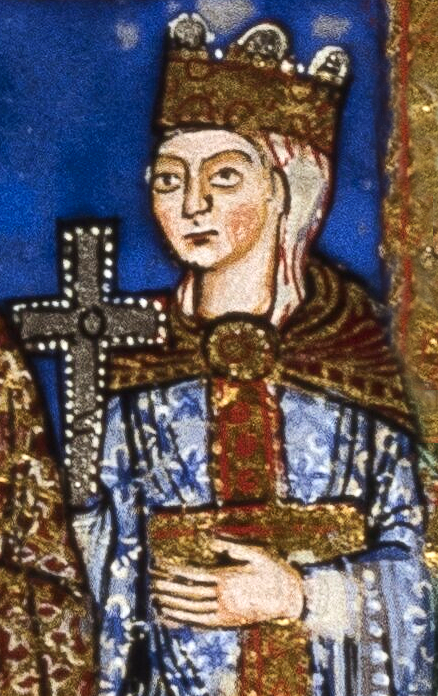
a contemporary depiction of Empress Matilda

When Empress Matilda, along with her half-brother Robert of Gloucester and her supporters, landed in Sussex in 1139 to press her claim for the throne, John seems to have only been a nominal supporter of Stephen. His loyalty to the king seems to have been in sufficient doubt that his castle at Marlborough was briefly besieged. In 1140 the castle of Marlborough was also threatened by Robert fitzHubert, who had captured Devizes castle, but John tricked him into imprisonment and sold him to earl William of Gloucester. On the same year, king Stephen tried to appoint a breton governor in Wiltshire, causing the disfavour of both John and the Salisburys. When Stephen was captured at the Battle of Lincoln in 1141, John definitively switched allegiance to Matilda.

In September 1141, Matilda fled the siege of Winchester and took refuge in the Marshal's castle at Ludgershall. While covering her retreat from Winchester, John was forced to take refuge from the enemies at Wherwell Abbey. The attackers set fire to the building, and John was seriously injured by dripping lead from the melting roof, to the point that his pursuers thought him dead. Although he was splashed, burnt, and lost an eye, John was not dead and he stumbled back home to Marlborough on foot, in a 25 miles long march. In 1142 John is seen at the Empress's side again at Oxford, where his brother William Giffard was acting as a chancellor.

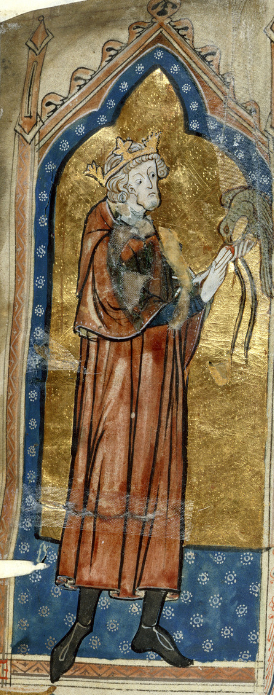
a 14th century depiction of King Stephen

In the mid 1140s (probably starting in 1145), John entered in conflict with Patrick of Salisbury in a matter of local power. Patrick launched a series of aggressive sieges, which John resisted; the first mentioned's eventual success might explain Matilda's decision to make him an earl. The matter was ultimately resolved by a marriage between John and Sybil, Patrick's sister, and John was forced to annul his pre-existing marriage to a woman named Adelina on the grounds of consanguinity.

In 1152, with the civil war dying down, John tried to increase his control in the Kennet Valley. This caught the attention of King Stephen, who promptly besieged him at Newbury castle. Stephen gave John a day to think about surrender, but Marshal asked for more time. As a consequence, the king demanded that one of John's sons was given to him as a hostage in order to prevent trickery. John agreed and sent out his youngest son, William Marshal, but he had no intention of actually keeping the agreement. Stephen sent John a messenger, stating the intention to hang William if he didn't change his mind, but John observed that he could make more and better sons anyway. Stephen, however, didn't want the young boy to die, and took pity on him (perhaps having lost two of his own sons). Little William was kept at the king's court, and was reunited with his mother Sybil after the end of the civil war in 1153.

=== Later matters ===
From 1156 onward John's affairs started declining, and he started to sell some of his properties. In 1158, King Henry II (who had succeeded Stephen) revoked John's possession of Marlborough castle, maybe considering him as a danger, but didn't deprive him of his role of marshal. In the same year, both in an attempt to decipher Merlin's fictitious prophecies and irritated by the loss of Marlborough, John let it be known that according to the prophecies, Henry II would have not returned in England after his campaign against Tolouse. When the king returned in 1163, he considered John as a traitor. John, however, restored the king's favor by taking part in the Becket controversy.

John had previously argued with Theobald of Bec (Thomas Becket's predecessor as Archbishop of Canterbury) that one of the archbishopric's estates belonged to him by hereditary right. It seems that he even occupied said estate. After Becket succeeded Theobald, he retook the estates for the archbishopric. John then tried to claim them back and presented himself at the archbishop's court, but he failed. However, he knew that the archbishop was falling out of royal favour, and he appealed to king Henry II. The king summoned a council to discuss the situation, and although that council would eventually lead to Becket's exile, he wasn't found guilty of the confiscation of John's property.

John Marshal died on 22 July 1165, and he was buried at the Salisbury family foundation of Bradenstoke in Wiltshire. His death was not sudden, as he had time to write a testament. After John, the title of marshal (later Earl Marshal) became honorific and hereditary.

== Family ==
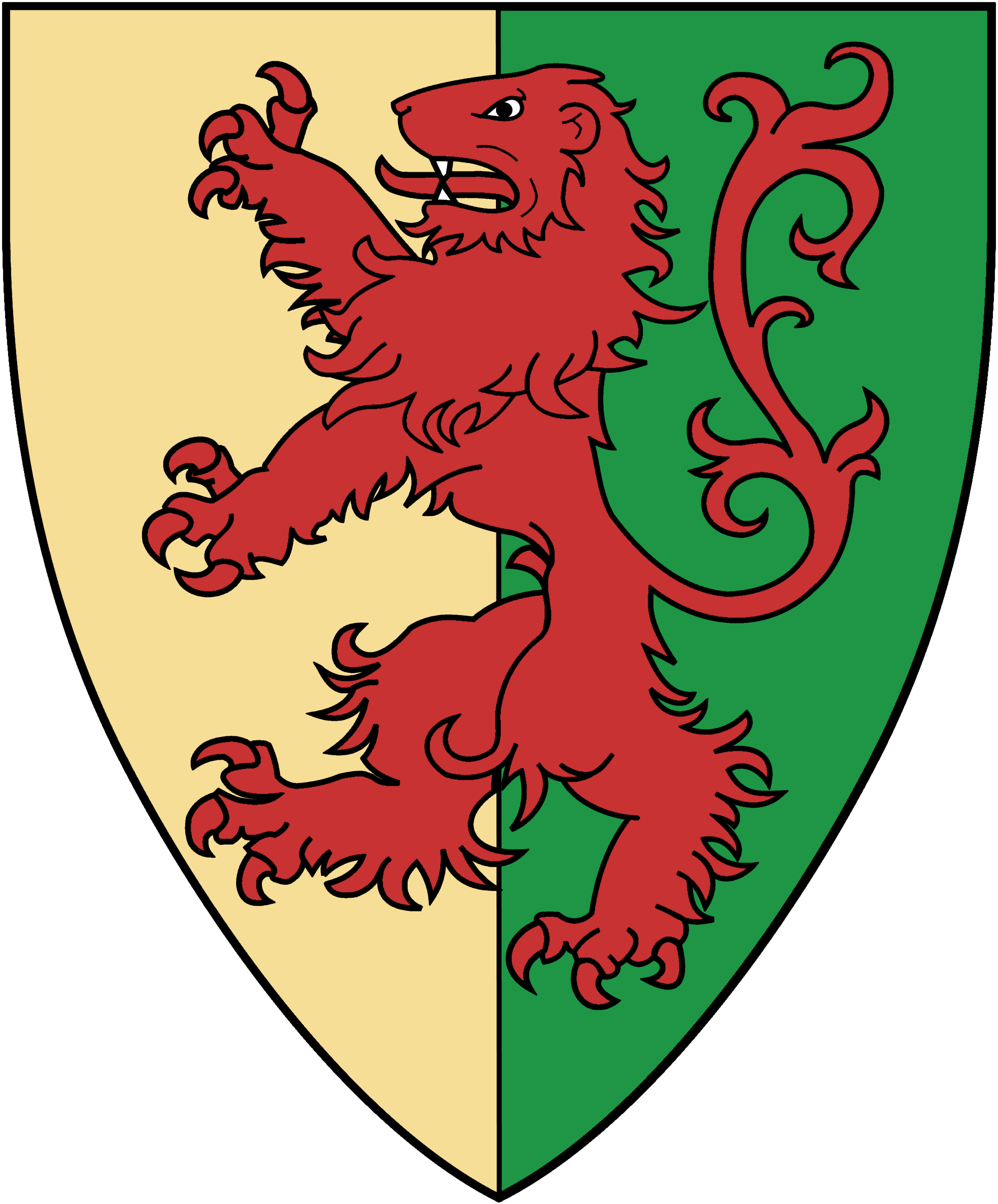
Coat of arms of William Marshal, 1st Earl of Pembroke

John was the son of Gilbert Giffard. He also had a brother named Walter Giffard, who held a clerical office.

His first wife was Adelina Pipard, the heiress of the baron Walter Pipard. By her, John had two sons: Walter, who predeceased him, and Gilbert, who died shortly after him. John then cast Adelina aside in order to marry Sybil, sister of Patrick of Salisbury. Adelina was subsequently remarried to Stephen de Gay, maternal uncle of Earl Robert of Gloucester.

John's eldest son by Sybil was also called John (II); upon his father's death, he inherited the title of Marshal. When John (II) died, King Richard the Lionheart gave the title to his brother, the well-known William Marshal. As well as John (II) and William, John (I) and Sybil also had Henry, who went on to become Bishop of Exeter, and Ansel Marshal, who served as a knight under his brother William and under his cousin Rotrou IV, Count of Perche. They also had two daughters. Margaret, who married William le Gros: they had a daughter, Margaret, wife of Ralph de Somery, and Matilda, wife of Robert du Pont de l'Arche.

== Historical fiction ==
- John FitzGilbert the Marshal is the subject of Elizabeth Chadwick's 2007 novel, A Place beyond Courage.
- John Marshal is a prominent character in Sharon Kay Penman's 1995 novel, When Christ and His Saints Slept.
