= William of Huntingfield =

English baron

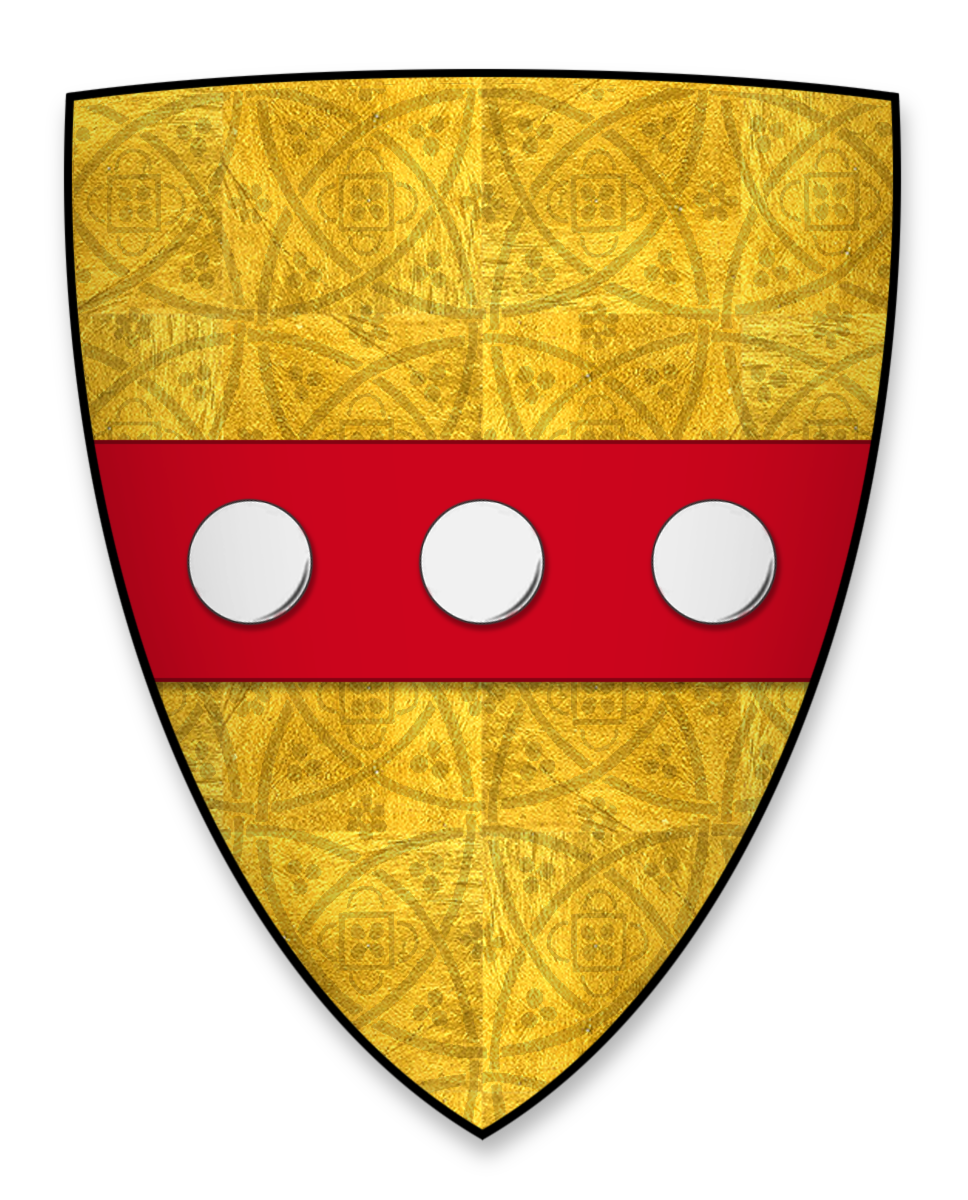
Arms of William de Huntingfield, Sheriff of Norfolk and Suffolk

William of Huntingfield (died c. 1225) was a medieval English baron, Sheriff of Norfolk and Suffolk and one of the sureties of Magna Carta.

He held Dover Castle for King John from September 1203 (as a Lord Warden of the Cinque Ports) and in exchange, the king took his son and daughter hostage. He was granted the lands seized from his disgraced brother and appointed Sheriff of Norfolk and Suffolk for 1210 and 1211. In the First Barons' War he was an active rebel against King John and one of the twenty-five chosen to oversee the observance of the resulting Magna Carta.

He subsequently supported the French invasion of England, and took part in the Fifth Crusade, during which he died.

== Family ==
William was son of Roger de Huntingfield and Alice de Senlis, who was a granddaughter of Simon, Earl of Huntingdon and Northampton.

He married Isabel, the daughter of William Fitz Roger of Gressinghall, Norfolk. Isabel had been twice widowed: her first husband was Berenger de Cressy, and her second Osmund de Stuteville. They had two sons and four daughters. William was succeeded by his elder son Roger.

== Notes ==
- "Huntingfield, William de" . Dictionary of National Biography. London: Smith, Elder & Co. 1885–1900.
