= Simon Burley =

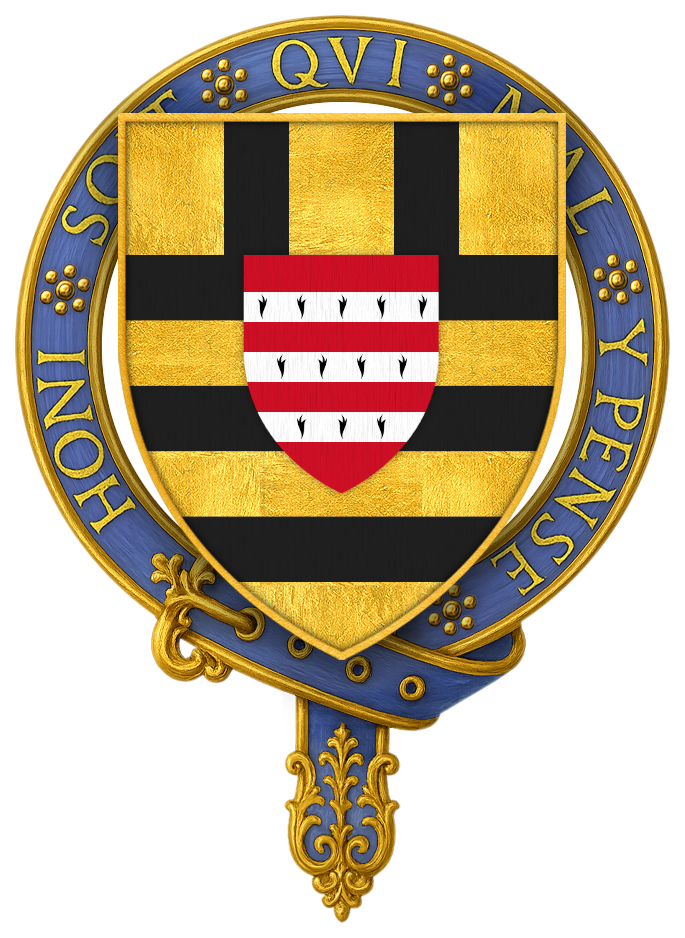
Arms of Sir John Burley, KG

Sir Simon de Burley (ca. 1336 – 5 May 1388) was holder of the offices of Lord Warden of the Cinque Ports and Constable of Dover Castle between 1384–88, and was a Knight of the Garter.

== Life ==
Sir Simon Burley was one of the most influential men in the court of King Richard II of England. He was brought up with Edward, the Black Prince; they became intimate friends, and Burley was raised to become a tutor to the prince's son, later Richard II. He first served in the fleet which destroyed the Spanish corsairs in 1350. In 1355, he took part in Edward's abortive expedition from Calais, and in 1364 he appears in attendance on the Black Prince in Aquitaine. By him he was sent on the embassy to Peter of Castile in 1366, and shared in his restoration and the victory of Najara in 1367. On the war being renewed in 1369, he was attacked near Lusignan, when with a detached force, and made prisoner by the French. On the release of the Isabella of Valois, Duchess of Bourbon he was exchanged (1370) and rejoined the Black Prince at Limoges.

In 1377, Richard II confirmed an annual grant of £100 to Burley granted to him first by Sir John Chandos and then by Edward III along with the custody of Carmarthen castle, in terms referring to him as "the King's father's Knight". In the same year, Burley was given the office of Master of the Falcon and Keeper of the Mews near Charring, and was appointed constable of Windsor Castle for life. The following year, the King further granted Burley the manor of Chiltenham in Gloucester and the 'fee simple' of the castle and lordship of Llanstephan.

In 1382, Richard granted him the office of under-chamberlain of the King's household for life, and appointed him surveyor of the lands in South Wales in the King's hands during the minority of the heir of Edmund Mortimer. In 1384, the King granted him for life the constableship of Dover Castle and the wardenship of the Cinque Ports, and three hundred pounds yearly (for the maintenance of himself, chaplains, etc.) with provision that he exercise the office himself. His long connection with the family of Richard II is indicated by his being named by Joan of Kent, King Richard's mother, as one of the executors of her will in 1385.

In 1388 Burley, along with other favourites of the King, was impeached for treason by the commons under the Merciless Parliament. He was executed on 5 May 1388.

=== Role in 1381 Peasants' Revolt ===
In some histories, Sir Simon Burley figures as the trigger for the explosion of the English Peasants' Revolt in 1381 in the county of Kent. In the story related by the Anonimalle Chronicle, Simon Burley appeared in Gravesend with two sergeants on 3 June 1381, and laid claim that one of its residents, a certain Robert Belling (or Bellyng), was his runaway bondsman. When the townsfolk of Gravesend pleaded with Burley on the man's behalf, Burley demanded £300 in silver for manumission. It was an enormous sum that Belling could not afford nor his Gravesend supporters raise for his release, so Burley ordered the royal sergeants to arrest Belling and confine him to nearby Rochester Castle until the money was raised. This incident hit a nerve in the region, long tired of corruption and abuses by royal officials, and led directly to a riot in Dartford (just seven miles from Gravesend) the next day. An armed band was raised that would go on to attack Rochester Castle on 6 June and spring Robert Belling out of jail. Wat Tyler would be elected leader of this Kentish rebel band a few days later.

There are a few problems with the Anonimalle story. Firstly, Simon Burley was abroad at the time, negotiating the king's marriage with Anne of Bohemia, and so could not have appeared at Gravesend in person. Secondly, uniquely among English counties, villein service was not practiced in Kent at the time. Nonetheless, the release of Robert Belling from Rochester is well-attested in other sources. So it is possible that Belling may have run away from Burley's estates in another county (e.g. Essex), and that the claim in Gravesend was carried out by another official in Burley's name.

== Family ==
Simon Burley had no children (that survived). His father was a John Burley of Birley, Hereford, and Simon was the younger brother of another Sir John Burley who, along with his son Richard had also served under the Black Prince and were also both Knights of the Garter.

Preceded by Sir Robert Assheton	Lord Warden of the Cinque Ports; 1384–1387	Succeeded by The Lord Devereux
