= Sheriff's aid =

Sheriff's aid was a medieval supplementary payment by landowners to the sheriffs and their staffs.

In July 1163, Henry II of England proposed in Woodstock, Oxfordshire that sheriff's aid should be paid not to the sheriffs, but into the royal treasury, in order to levy a sort of danegeld (which wasn't being levied as such at that time because of its unpopularity) and at the same time reduce the sheriffs' profits. Thomas Becket, the Archbishop of Canterbury, opposed the expedient, arguing that sheriff's aid was a free-will offering and declaring that not a penny should be paid from his estates or church lands. The king received little support from the courtiers, and the incident enlarged the rift between king and archbishop.
