= Marlborough Castle =

Medieval castle in Wiltshire, England

- Old Bath Road; Near Marlborough in United Kingdom
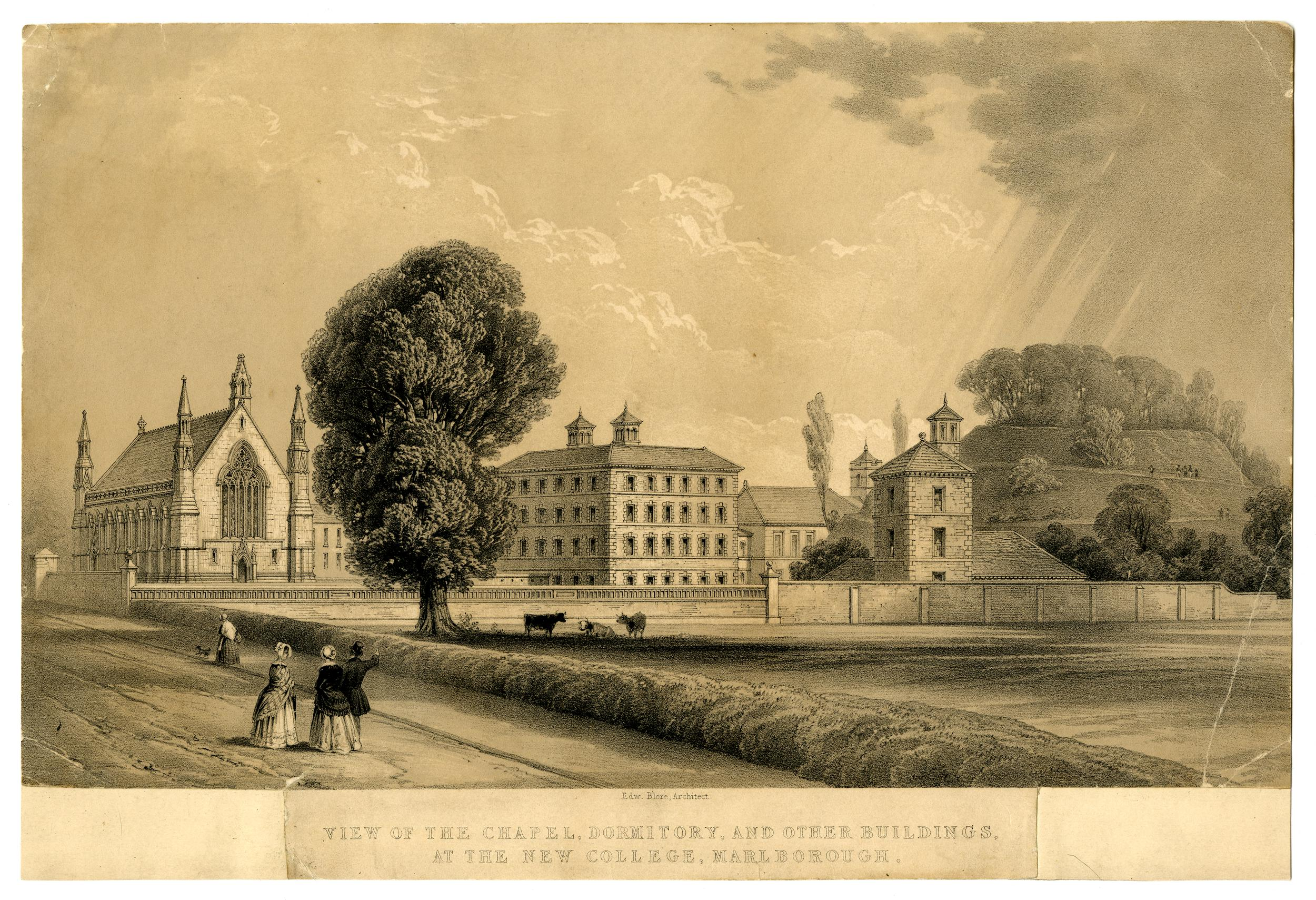
- An early 19th century Lithograph showing the motte of Marlborough Castle (right) within the grounds of the newly established Marlborough College.

Location
- Location within Wiltshire
- Coordinates: 51°25′0.0″N 1°44′14.0″W

Site history
- In use: 1067 – 1403
- Materials: wood, stone
- Fate: demolished
- Events: The Anarchy

Marlborough Castle, locally known and recorded in historical documents as The Mound, was an 11th-century royal castle located in the civil parish of Marlborough. It is a market town in the English county of Wiltshire, on the Old Bath Road, the former main road from London to Bath (grid reference SU18376866). The barrow on which the fortification was built, perhaps the "barrow of Maerla", seems to be a prehistoric earthwork which formed the motte of the Norman Marlborough Castle. It survives as a tree-covered mound known as Marlborough Mound, within the site of Marlborough College. The Mound is on private ground and closed to the public except for occasional open days organised by the local council.

== History ==
Radiocarbon dating of core samples in the early 2010s indicated that the Mound (or motte) dates from 2400 BC. This is close to the dates established for Silbury Hill.

In 1067, William the Conqueror assumed control of the Marlborough area and set Roger, Bishop of Salisbury, to building a wooden motte-and-bailey castle, sited on the prehistoric mound. Ethelric, bishop of Selsey, was imprisoned at Marlborough in 1070, and the Victoria County History of Wiltshire suggests that it may have been at a castle, though historian Richard Barber notes that the imprisonment could have been in another structure as there is no direct reference to the castle. William established the neighbouring Savernake Forest as a favourite royal hunting ground, and Marlborough Castle became a royal residence: Henry I spent Easter at Marlborough in 1110, that strongly suggests that it was inhabitable.

During 'the Anarchy' John FitzGilbert the marshal held Marlborough Castle for Stephen out of the fealty he owed him. Stephen besieged the castle in July 1139, lifting it the following month before the defenders capitulated so that he could lead a campaign in another part of the country. In 1147 the 14-year-old future king Henry II marched into Wiltshire and seized Marlborough. He then stayed at the castle in 1149 while in talks with David I of Scotland about a potential northern alliance to attack Stephen's forces in Yorkshire. Stone was later used to strengthen the castle, around 1175.

The earliest record of royal expenditure on the castle dates from 1175–1176 when £43 was spent of building materials to create accommodation for the king. Prince John married Isabel of Gloucester at the castle on 29 August 1189. John would spend some time in Marlborough, where he established a Treasury to support the Royal Mints that had been established by William I and William II.

The castle became more important as an administrative centre during John's reign, and he visited the castle 51 times. During the First Barons' War, the castellan joined the rebels in their struggle against John. William Marshal besieged Marlborough Castle in 1217, by which point John was already dead, and captured it for the royalist cause. According to History of William the Marshall, William Marshal (the father of the William who besieged Marlborough) gave orders to demolish (slight) castles captured from the rebels.

From 1223 to 1224, Eleanor of Brittany, cousin of Henry III and with a better claim to the throne according to primogeniture, was briefly kept there as a state prisoner, during which time the council suggested additional horsemen and crossbowmen. Between 1227 and 1272, Henry III spent the enormous sum of £2,000 on its buildings, particularly the apartments and chambers, and the chapel of St Nicholas.

After the death of Henry III, Marlborough lost favour as a royal residence. From 1273 to 1369 it was used only as a dower house, the castle, with the royal borough attached to it, was assigned in 1273 for life to Henry's widow, Queen Eleanor (d. 1291), during whose tenure Edmund FitzAlan, 9th Earl of Arundel was born in the castle, 1 May 1285.

In 1293 it passed to the eldest daughter of King Edward I and Eleanor of Provence, also named Eleanor, who married Henry III, Count of Bar. In 1294 one of Edward's household knights, Eustace of Hatch, the constable of the castle, was appointed to extend the value of the dowry associated with the lands of the castle to 15,000 livres tournois per year. The younger Eleanor died in 1298, aged 29. In 1299, Eustace Hatch was granted 90 oaks from nearby Savernake Forest for the renovation of the great hall and chamber: in the same year the castle was assigned to Edward I's second wife Queen Marguerite (d. here 14 February 1318) in 1318 to King Edward II's consort Queen Isabella, who was deprived of it in the period 1324–1327; and in 1330 to Queen Philippa, on whose death in 1369 it reverted to the Crown.

Marlborough Castle ceased to be used in 1370 and fell into disrepair but remained Crown property. Edward VI then passed it to the Seymour family, his mother's relatives.

== Later use ==
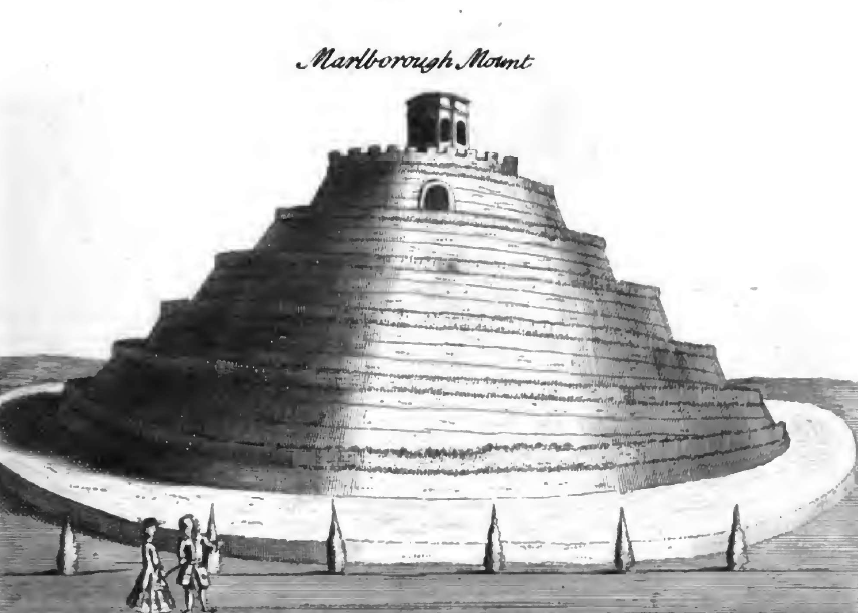
An illustration of Marlborough Mound in a 1776 copy of Itinerarium Curiosum by English Antiquarian William Stukeley.

The castle was a ruin by 1403. A new residence was built on the site by Francis Seymour, 1st Baron Seymour of Trowbridge (c.1590–1664), who had acquired the site from his elder brother William Seymour, 2nd Duke of Somerset (1588–1660). It was replaced in 1683–1684 by the "new house" for his grandson Charles Seymour, 6th Duke of Somerset, apparently to designs by John Deane, a surveyor of Reading, Berkshire. The house forms the nucleus of the present Marlborough College. In the 18th century it was the beloved residence of Isabella, Countess of Hertford, the patroness of William Shenstone and James Thomson. Stephen Duck, the "thresher poet", described the house during Lady Hertford's time in A description of a Journey to Marlborough....

The house declined into a coaching inn, the Castle Inn, where the Marlborough Club, whose members were Tory gentlemen from Marlborough and the surrounding area, was established in 1774. The club met at the inn until 1842; the house became the nucleus of Marlborough College, founded in 1843.

== Preservation ==
The tree-covered earthworks mound, within the grounds of Marlborough College, is a Scheduled Monument. Parts of the keep and curtain wall have been identified by excavation. Neolithic and a Roman coin have also been discovered in the vicinity of the mound.
