= Charles South =

Charles South may refer to:

- Charles L. South (1892–1965), U.S. Representative from Texas
- Charles Frederick South (1850–1916), cathedral organist
