= Walter Galpin Alcock =

English organist and composer

Alcock in 1913

Sir Walter Galpin Alcock MVO (29 December 1861 – 11 September 1947) was an English organist and composer. He held a number of prominent positions as an organist and played at the coronations of three monarchs. He was professor of organ in the Royal College of Music, London.

== Life and career ==
Alcock was born at Edenbridge, Kent. At the age of 15 he won a scholarship to the National Training School for Music, where he studied composition with Arthur Sullivan and the organ with John Stainer.

After a brief series of posts (Holy Trinity Sloane Street and St. Margaret's, Westminster), in 1893 he was appointed Organ Professor at the Royal College of Music. He was assistant organist of Westminster Abbey from 1896, and was concurrently organist of the Chapels Royal from 1902. In 1916 he became organist of Salisbury Cathedral where he oversaw a strictly faithful restoration of the famous Father Willis organ, even going to such lengths as to refuse to allow parts of the instrument to leave the cathedral in case any unauthorised tonal alteration were made without his knowledge while allowing some discreet additions in the original style of the organ (as well as modernisation of the organ's actions) by Henry Willis III, the grandson of Father Willis.

Alcock had the unique distinction of playing the organ at Westminster Abbey at the coronations of three kings: Edward VII (1902), George V (1911) and George VI (1937).

Between 1917 and 1924, Alcock, with Charles Harford Lloyd, juggled the post of Director of the Madrigal Society, to assist the ageing Sir Frederick Bridge, who had been appointed to the role in 1888.

Alcock was knighted in 1933 for services to music. He was a distinguished teacher, whose published material for organ students is still thought valuable. Among his notable pupils were Edward Bairstow, Ralph Downes, and S. Drummond Wolff.

His hobbies included the construction of a model railway, on which choirboys at Salisbury would be given rides.

Alcock died at the age of 85. His funeral service was in Salisbury Cathedral.

In an obituary tribute Sir Thomas Armstrong wrote of "his firm foundations of good musicianship and sound tradition" and added:

What brilliance there was in his passage-work! What fire in his handling of a Bach Toccata! What restraint and climax in his fugue playing! It was virile, impassioned, romantic, but controlled. No academic pretensions here about making it sound like some emasculated eighteenth-century instrument! And at eighty Alcock was all that he had been at fifty, with an added maturity and mellowness. It was wonderful.

== Family ==
Walter Galpin Alcock was the son of Walter William Alcock and Mary Galpin. In 1871 Walter William was the superintendent of the Metropolitan Police Orphanage at Fortescue House, Twickenham.

In 1893 Alcock married Naomi Blanche Lucas. They had one son and five daughters. The eldest daughter, Naomi Judith, married Dingwall Bateson in 1922.

Cultural offices
Preceded by William Creser	Organist and Master of the Children of the Chapel Royal; 1902-1916	Succeeded by Charles Harford Lloyd
Preceded by Charles Frederick South	Organist and Master of the Choristers of Salisbury Cathedral; 1916-1947	Succeeded by David Willcocks
