= Nick Papadopulos =

English priest

The Very Reverend Nick Papadopulos DL
- Dean of Salisbury
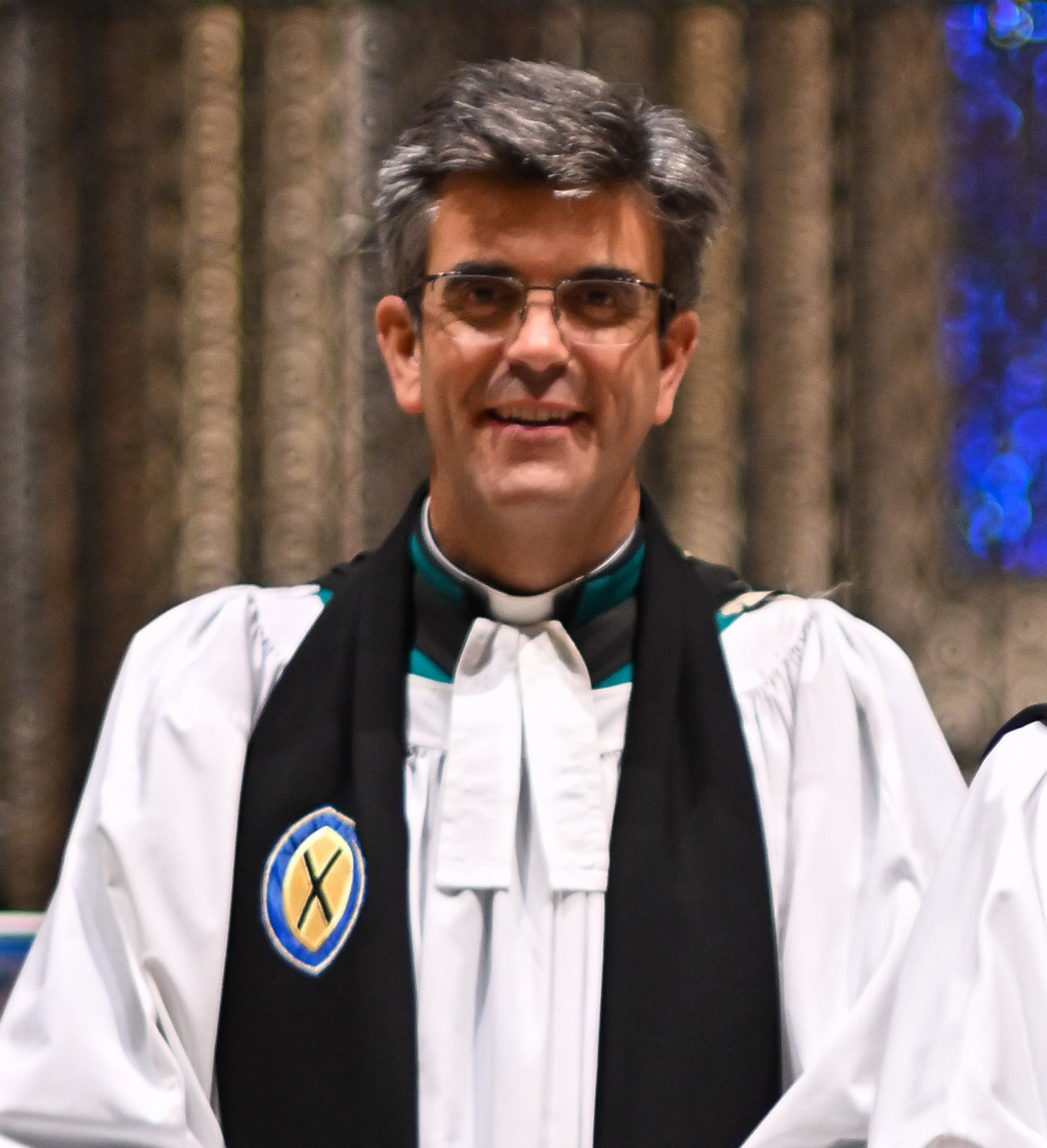
- Papadopulos in 2022
- Church: Church of England
- Diocese: Diocese of Salisbury
- In office: 2018 to present
- Predecessor: June Osborne

Personal details
- Born: 1966 (age 59–60)
- Denomination: Anglicanism

Nicholas Charles Papadopulos (born 1966) is a Church of England priest and the Dean of Salisbury.

== Biography ==
Papadopulos was born in 1966. He was educated at the King's School, Rochester, before gaining a degree in history from Gonville and Caius College, Cambridge. After studying law at City University, London and being called to the bar in 1990, he worked as a barrister practising criminal law for seven years. He then studied for ordination at Ripon College, Cuddesdon.

He was ordained in 1999, and was for three years a curate in the parish of St Mark, Portsea, an inner-city area of Portsmouth. From 2002 to 2007, he was chaplain and press officer to the bishop of Salisbury, David Stancliffe. He was the vicar of St Peter's Church, Eaton Square, London, from 2007 to 2013, and canon treasurer of Canterbury Cathedral from 2013. He was instituted Dean of Salisbury at Salisbury Cathedral on 9 September 2018, succeeding June Osborne, who had held the post for 13 years.

Papadopulos is the editor of God's Transforming Work (SPCK, 2011), an assessment of the development of Common Worship in its first 10 years, to which he contributed an appreciation of the ministry of Bishop David Stancliffe.

He was elected to the executive of the Association of English Cathedrals in 2022.

He was commissioned as a deputy lieutenant of Wiltshire in January 2024.

He is married, with two children.
