= Salisbury Cathedral =

Coordinates: 51°03′53″N 1°47′51″W

- Cathedral Church of the Blessed Virgin Mary, Salisbury
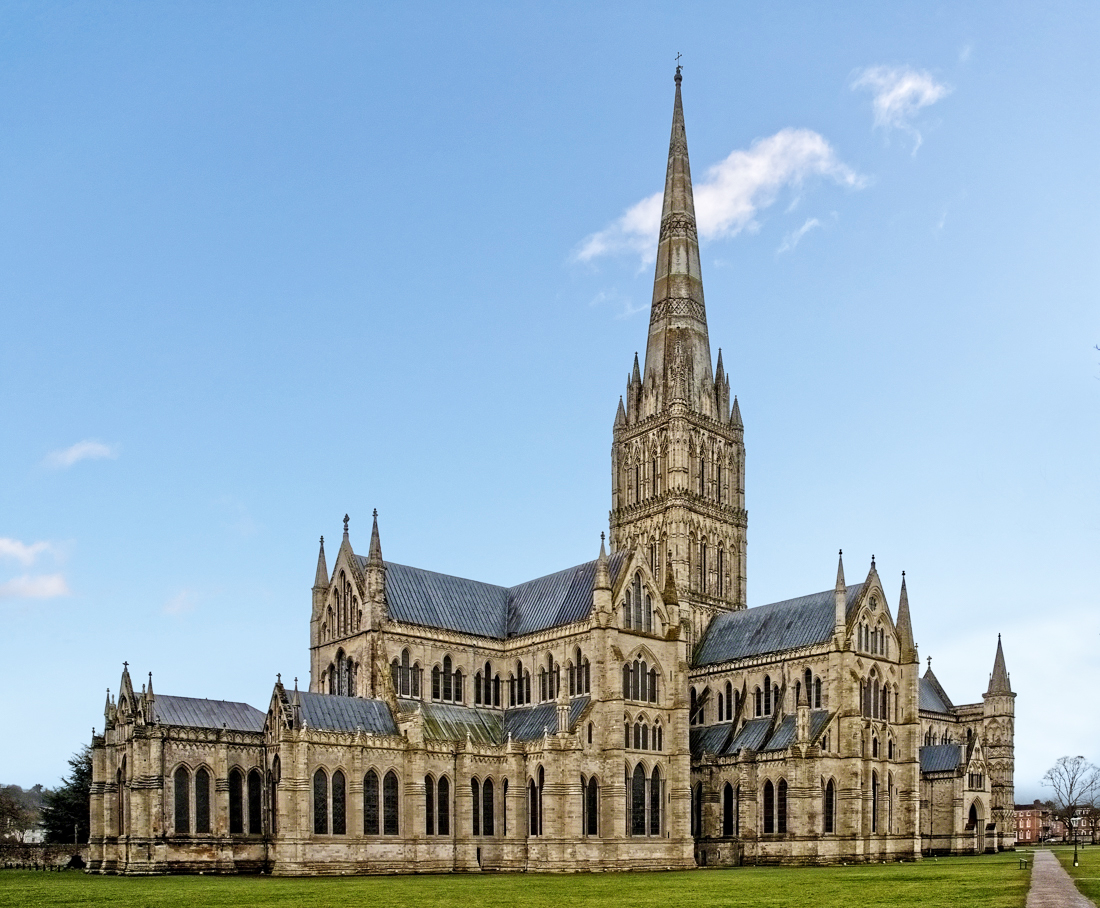
- Salisbury Cathedral from the north-east

- Location within Wiltshire
- OS grid reference: SU 14302 29533
- Location: Salisbury, Wiltshire
- Country: England
- Denomination: Church of England
- Previous denomination: Roman Catholic
- Churchmanship: Anglo-Catholic
- Website: www.salisburycathedral.org.uk

Architecture
- Previous cathedrals: 2
- Architect(s): Richard Poore; Elias of Dereham (possibly)
- Style: Early English Gothic
- Years built: 1220–1330
- Groundbreaking: 1220; 806 years ago

Specifications
- Length: 442 feet (135 m)

Administration
- Province: Canterbury
- Diocese: Salisbury

Clergy
- Bishop: Stephen Lake
- Dean: Nicholas Papadopulos

Salisbury Cathedral, formally the Cathedral Church of the Blessed Virgin Mary, is an Anglican cathedral in the city of Salisbury, England. The cathedral is regarded as one of the leading examples of Early English Gothic design. Built over a relatively short period, some 38 years between 1220 and 1258, it has a unity and coherence that is unusual in medieval English cathedrals. The tower and spire were completed by 1330. The cathedral's spire, at 404 feet (123 m), is the tallest in England. (Note: Salisbury is also the United Kingdom's tallest cathedral. St Mary's Cathedral in Edinburgh is the tallest church building in Scotland at 295 feet (90 m), St Eugene's Cathedral in Derry the tallest in Northern Ireland at 256 feet (78 m), and Llandaff Cathedral is the tallest cathedral in Wales at 195 feet (59 m), although it is exceeded in height by St Margaret's Church, Bodelwyddan at 202 feet (62 m).)

The original cathedral in the district was located at Old Sarum, about 2 miles (3 km) north of the present city. In 1197 bishop Herbert Poore determined on a relocation but this was not taken forward until the episcopate of his brother, Richard Poore in the early 13th century. Foundation stones for the new building were laid on 28 April 1220 by the Earl and Countess of Salisbury. By 1258 the nave, transepts and choir were complete. The only major additions were the cloisters, added 1240, the chapter house in 1263, and the tower and spire, which was constructed by 1330. At its completion it was the third highest in England, but the collapse of those at Lincoln Cathedral and Old St Paul's Cathedral in the 16th century saw Salisbury become England's tallest.

The cathedral close is Britain's largest, and has many buildings of architectural and/or historical significance. Pevsner describes it as "the most beautiful of England's closes". The cathedral contains a clock which is among the oldest working examples in the world. It also holds one of the four surviving original copies of Magna Carta. In 2008, the cathedral celebrated the 750th anniversary of its consecration. In 2023, the completion of a programme of external restoration begun in 1985 saw the removal of scaffolding that had stood around the building for some 37 years.

== History ==
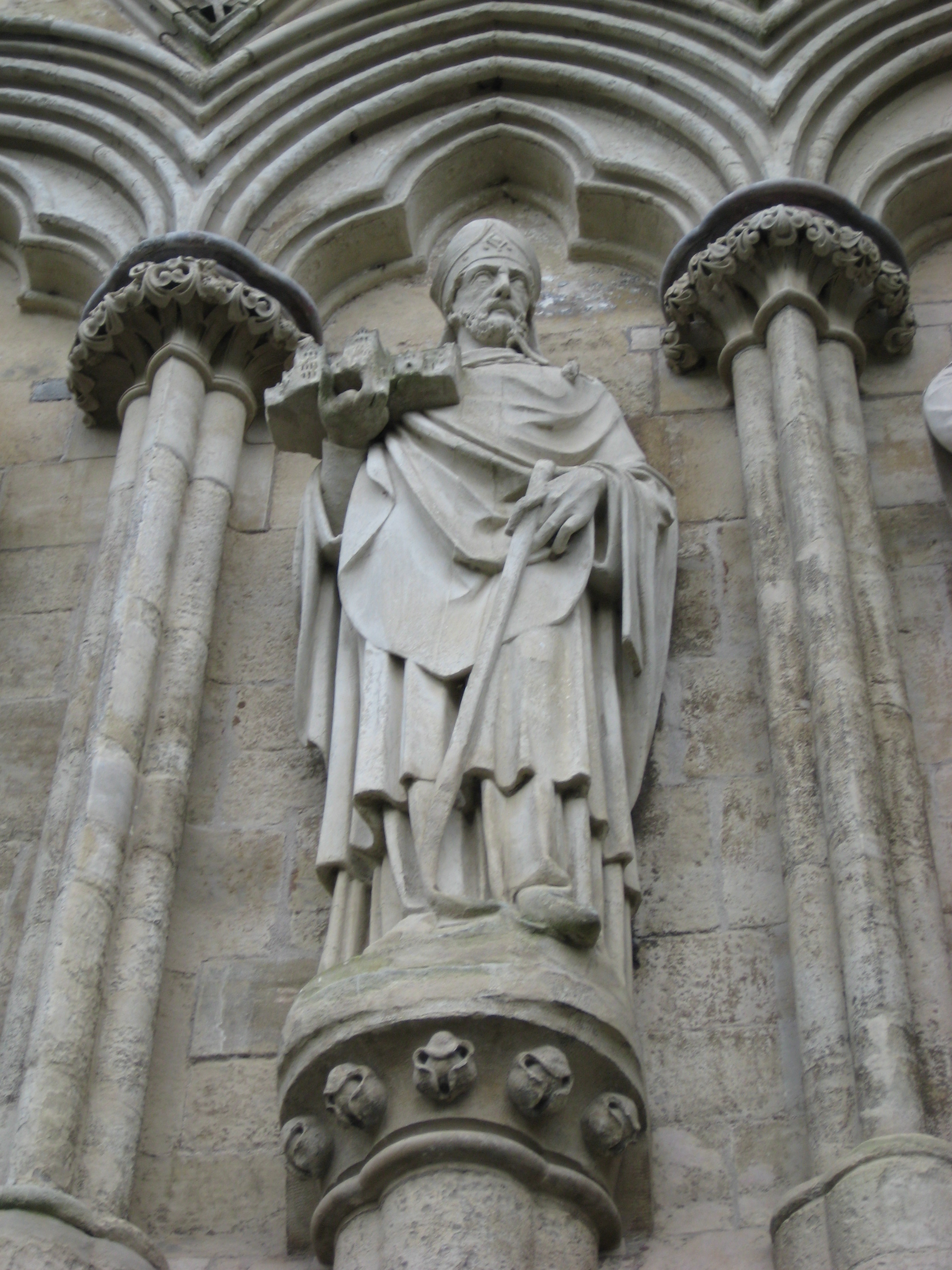
Sculpture on the west front of the cathedral of Bishop Richard Poore who oversaw the early years of its construction, beginning in 1220; he is holding a model of the cathedral

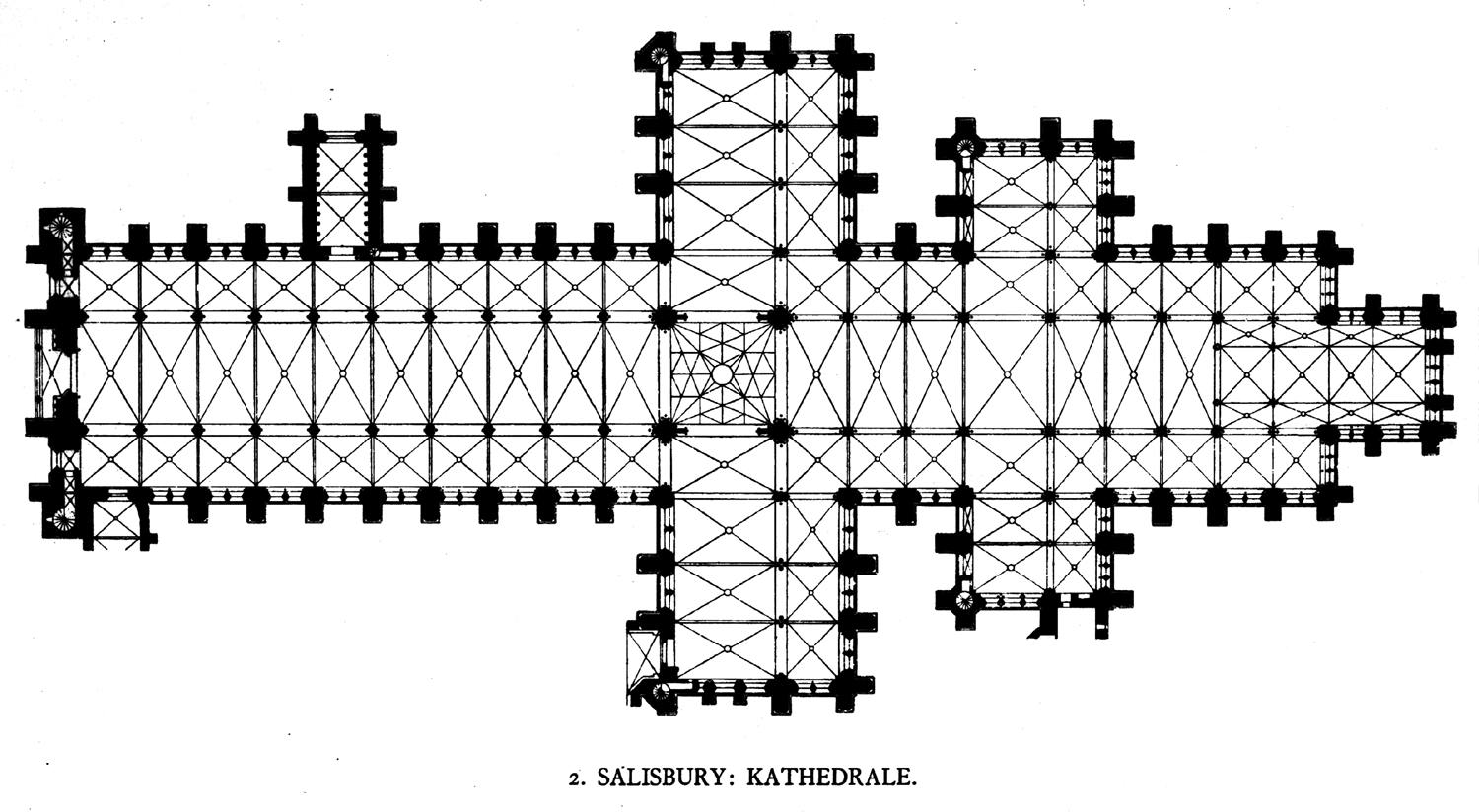
Plan showing the double transepts with aisles and extended east end, but not the cloisters or chapter house

Salisbury became the seat of a bishop in 1075. At the time, the city was at the now-abandoned site of Old Sarum, on a hill about 2 miles (3.2 km) north of the present-day cathedral. Old Sarum Cathedral was built in the years after and was consecrated in 1092.

In 1197, bishop Herbert Poore sought permission to re-site the cathedral, possibly due to deteriorating relations between the clergy and the military at Old Sarum. Permission was granted but the move was delayed repeatedly until the tenure of his successor and brother Richard Poore. A legend tells that Bishop Poore shot an arrow in the direction he would build the cathedral; the arrow hit a deer, which died in the place where Salisbury Cathedral is now. (Note: The cathedral crossing, Old Sarum, and Stonehenge are reputed to be aligned on a ley line, although Clive L. N. Ruggles asserts that the site, on marshland, was chosen because a preferred site several miles to the west could not be obtained.)

Construction was paid for by donations, principally from the canons and vicars of southeast England, who were asked to contribute a fixed annual sum until the building was completed. The foundation stones were laid on 28 April 1220 by William Longespée, 3rd Earl of Salisbury, and by Ela of Salisbury, 3rd Countess of Salisbury. Much of the freestone for the cathedral came from the Teffont Evias Quarry. As a result of the high water table on the new site, the cathedral was built on foundations only 4 feet (1.2 m) deep. By 1258, the nave, transepts, and choir were complete. As a result of being mostly built in only 38 years, Salisbury has by far the most consistent architectural style of any medieval English cathedral. The style used is known as Early English Gothic or Lancet Gothic, the latter referring to the use of lancet windows which are not divided by tracery.

The only major sections begun later were the cloisters, added in 1240, the chapter house in 1263, the tower and spire, which at 404 feet (123 m) dominated the skyline from 1330. In total, 70,000 tons of stone, 3,000 tons of timber and 450 tons of lead were used in the construction of the cathedral. Upon completion, it had the highest masonry spire in England and the third highest overall, after Lincoln and St Paul's. The collapse of the latter two spires in the mid-16th century left Salisbury's as the highest overall.

In the 17th century, Christopher Wren designed restoration measures to strengthen the central pillars, which by then had visibly deformed under the weight of the tower and spire. Significant changes to the cathedral were made by the architect James Wyatt in 1790, including the replacement of the original rood screen and demolition of a bell tower which stood about 320 feet (98 m) northwest of the main building.

=== 21st century ===
In 2008, the cathedral celebrated the 750th anniversary of its consecration. In 2023, the completion of a programme of external restoration begun in 1985 saw the removal of scaffolding that had stood around the building for some 37 years.

The cathedral previously employed five cathedral constables (known as "Close Constables"), whose duties mainly concerned the maintenance of law and order in the cathedral close. They were made redundant in 2010 as part of cost-cutting measures. The constables were first appointed when the cathedral became a liberty in 1611 and survived until the introduction of municipal police forces in 1835 with the Municipal Corporations Act. In 1800 they were given the power, along with the city constables, to execute any justices' or court orders requiring the conveyance of prisoners to or from the county jail (at Fisherton Anger, then outside the city of Salisbury) as if it were the city jail (and, in so doing, they were made immune from any legal action for acting outside their respective jurisdictions). The right of the cathedral, as a liberty, to maintain a separate police force was conclusively terminated by the Local Government Act 1888.

Between 1864 and 1953 there were records of peregrine falcons being present at the cathedral. More arrived in 2013 and have been hatching every year since with their nests on the cathedral's tower.

In 2016, the cathedral chapter placed Sophie Ryder's sculpture The Kiss (of a pair of hands) straddling a path in the grounds. It was moved shortly thereafter, due to pedestrians colliding with it while texting. In 2018 there was an attempted theft of the cathedral's copy of Magna Carta; the alarms were triggered and a 45-year-old man was later detained on suspicion of attempted theft, criminal damage and possession of an offensive weapon. The outer layer of a double-layered glass case containing the document was broken, but the document suffered no damage. In January 2020 Mark Royden, from Kent, was found guilty of the attempted theft, which caused £14,466 of damage, and of criminal damage.

From 16 January 2021, while closed to services during the COVID-19 pandemic, the cathedral was used to accommodate the vaccination programme in the United Kingdom, a day after Lichfield Cathedral became the first place of worship to become part of the immunisation plan against the pandemic in England. A selection of music was played on the organ as people received their vaccinations. In February 2024, the full exterior of the cathedral could be seen for the first time in 38 years after the removal of scaffolding that had been erected for extensive renovation works.

== Building and architecture ==
In Pevsner's architectural guides, the cathedral is described as the beau idéal of Early English Gothic architecture, distinguished by a unity and coherence rarely found among English cathedrals.

=== West front ===
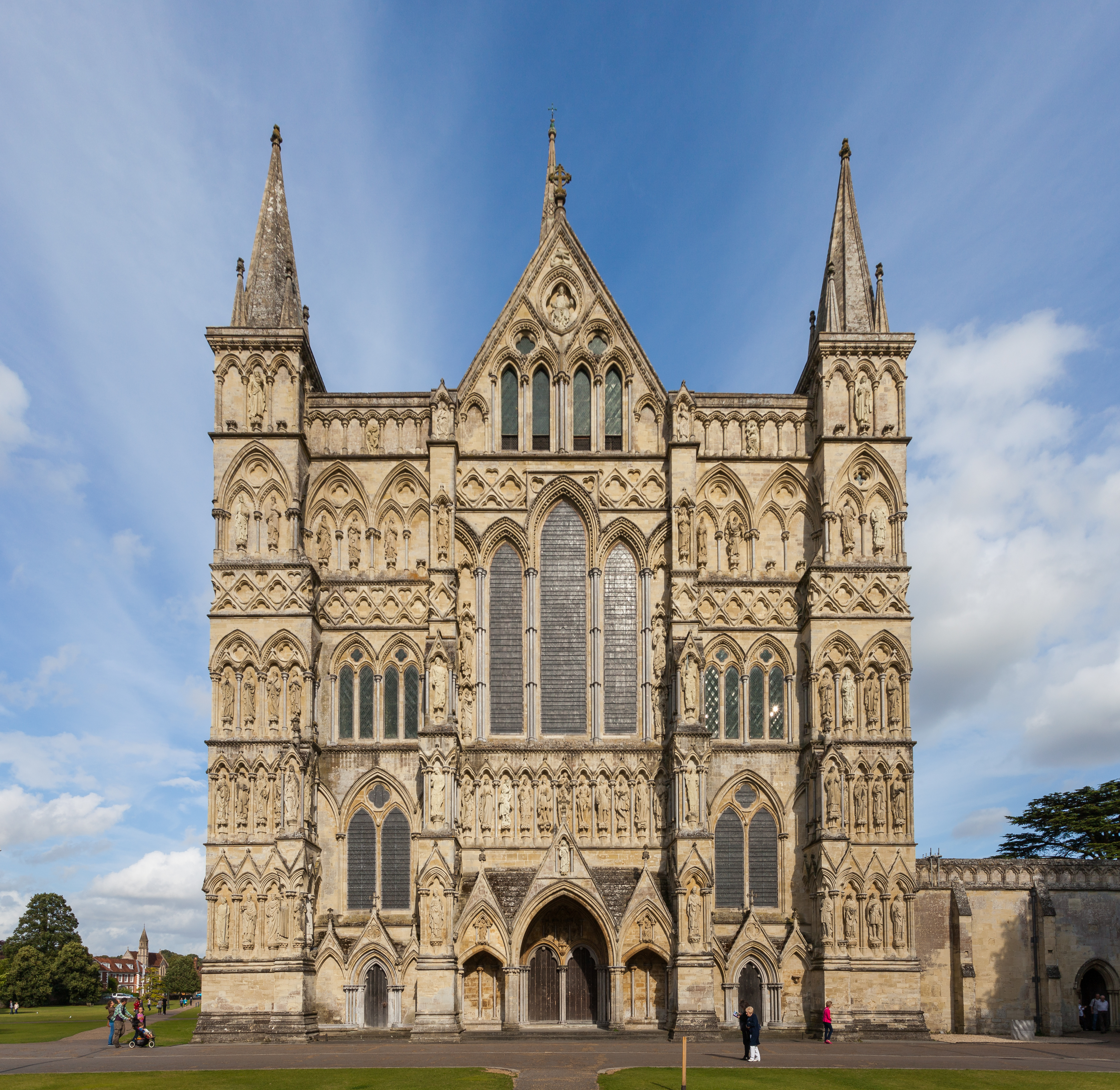
The west front.

The west front is of the screen-type, clearly deriving from that at Wells. It is composed of a stair turret at each extremity, with two niched buttresses nearer the centre line supporting the large central triple window. The stair turrets are topped with spirelets, and the central section is topped by a gable which contains four lancet windows topped by two round quatrefoil windows surmounted by a mandorla containing Christ in Majesty. At ground level there is a principal door flanked by two smaller doors. The whole is highly decorated with quatrefoil motifs, columns, trefoil motifs and bands of diapering.

The west front was almost certainly constructed at the same time as the cathedral. This is apparent from the way in which the windows coincide with the interior spaces. The entire facade is about 108 feet (33 m) high and wide. It lacks full-scale towers and/or spires as can be seen, for example at Wells, Lincoln, Lichfield, etc. The façade was disparaged by Alec Clifton-Taylor, who considered it the least successful of the English screen facades and a travesty of its prototype (Wells). He found the composition to be uncoordinated, and the Victorian statuary "poor and insipid".

The front accommodates over 130 shallow niches of varying sizes, 73 of which contain a statue. The line of niches extends round the turrets to the north, south and east faces. There are five levels of niches (not including the mandorla) which show, from the top, angels and archangels, Old Testament patriarchs, apostles and evangelists, martyrs, doctors and philosophers and, on the lower level, royalty, priests and worthy people connected with the cathedral. The majority of the statues were placed during the middle of the 19th century, however seven are from the 14th century and several have been installed within the last decade.

=== Nave ===
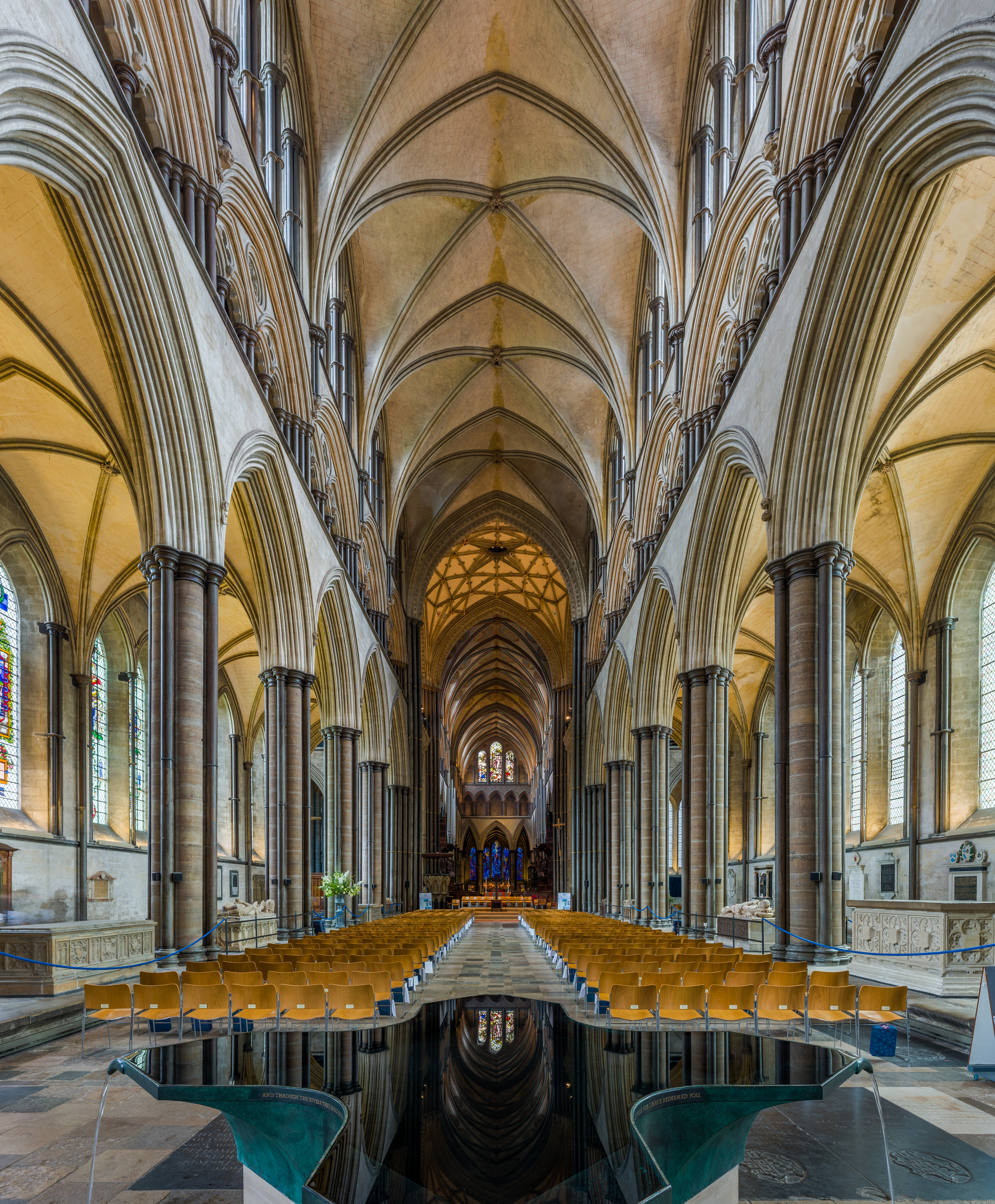
The nave, with William Pye's decorative font visible in the foreground

Salisbury Cathedral is unusual for its tall and narrow nave, which has visual accentuation from the use of light grey Chilmark stone for the walls and dark polished Purbeck marble for the columns. It has three levels: a tall pointed arcade, an open gallery and a small clerestory. Lined up between the pillars are notable tombs such as that of William Longespée, half brother of King John and the illegitimate son of Henry II, who was the first person to be buried in the cathedral.

Another unusual feature of the nave is an unconventional modern font, installed in September 2008. Designed by the water sculptor William Pye, it is the largest working font in any British cathedral, and replaced an earlier portable neo-Gothic Victorian font. The font is cruciform in shape, and has a 10-foot-wide vessel filled to its brim with water, designed so that the water overflows in filaments through each corner into bronze gratings embedded in the cathedral's stone floor. The project cost £180,000 and was funded entirely by donations. Some parishioners reportedly objected to the new font, considering it 'change for change's sake', although Pye argued that the majority opinion was in favour: "I would say 90 per cent are in happy anticipation, five per cent are nervously expectant and five per cent are probably apoplectic".

=== Tower and spire ===
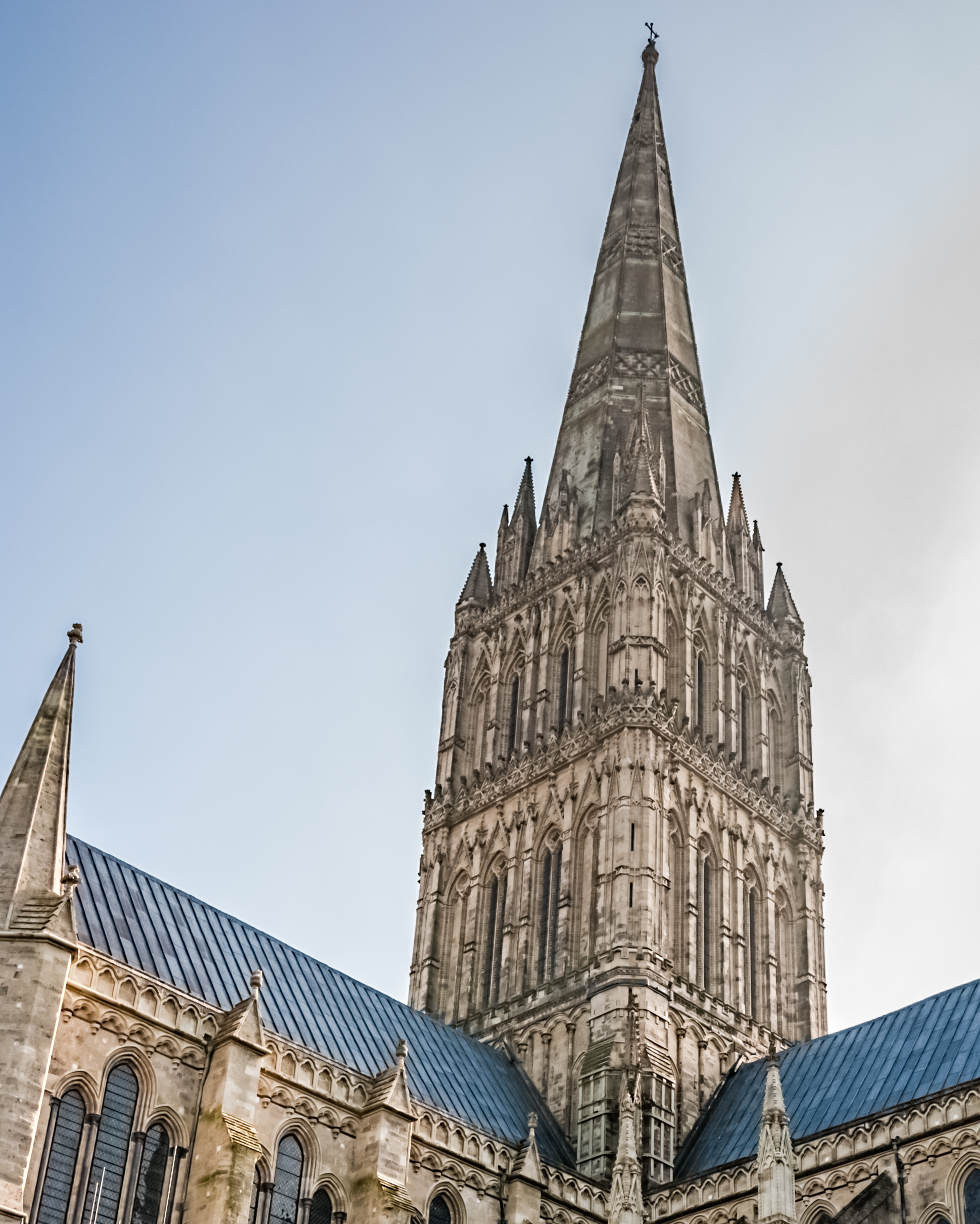
The tower seen from ground level.

Although the spire is the cathedral's most impressive feature, it has proved troublesome. Together with the tower, it added 6,397 long tons (6,500 t) to the weight of the building. Without the addition of buttresses, bracing arches and anchor irons over the succeeding centuries, it would have suffered the fate of spires on other great ecclesiastical buildings (such as Malmesbury Abbey, 1180 to 1500; Lincoln Cathedral, 1311 to 1548; Old St Paul's Cathedral, London, 1314 to 1561; and Chichester Cathedral, 1402 to 1861) and fallen down; instead, Salisbury became the tallest church spire in the country on the collapse at St Paul's (as the result of a fire) in 1561. The large supporting pillars at the corners of the spire are seen to bend inwards under the stress. The addition of reinforcing tie-beams above the crossing, designed by Christopher Wren in 1668, halted further deformation. The beams were hidden by a false ceiling installed below the lantern stage of the tower.

The bell chamber is in the middle level of the tower. The bells strike the hour and quarters and are now operated by a Victorian clock, which is not to be confused with the better-known medieval clock that is on display downstairs. Salisbury is one of only three English cathedrals to lack a ring of bells, the others being Norwich Cathedral and Ely Cathedral.

Visitors can access the tower by taking the "Tower Tour", allowing them to climb as high as the base of the spire. From this level, there is a view of the interior of the hollow spire and the ancient wooden scaffolding inside it. There are 332 steps from ground level to the base of the spire, ascending a height of 225 feet (69 m).

Maintenance workers have sometimes climbed the spire, including to service the aircraft warning light and weather station at the summit. The first 144 feet (44 m) of the spire can be climbed by internal ladders. The remaining 39 feet (12 m) requires climbing out of a small door and up the exterior. In 2010, Blue Peter presenter Helen Skelton climbed the spire to assist in the changing of the lights.

=== Chapter house and Magna Carta ===
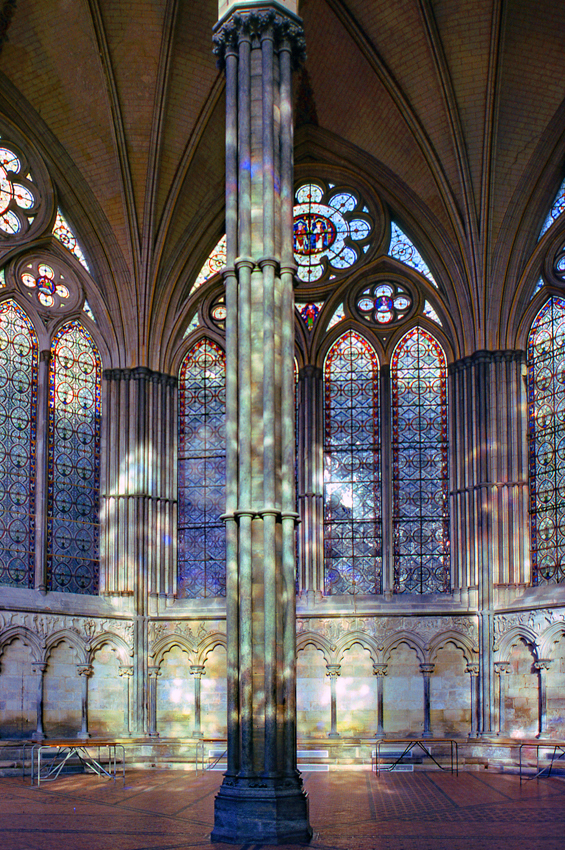
Interior of the Chapter House

The chapter house is notable for its octagonal shape, slender central pillar and decorative medieval frieze. It was redecorated in 1855–1859 by William Burges. The frieze, which circles the interior above the stalls, depicts scenes and stories from the books of Genesis and Exodus, including Adam and Eve, Noah, the Tower of Babel, and Abraham, Isaac and Jacob.

The chapter house displays the best-preserved of the four surviving original copies of Magna Carta. This copy came to Salisbury because Elias of Dereham, who was present at Runnymede in 1215, was given the task of distributing some of the original copies. Elias later became a canon of Salisbury and supervised the construction of the cathedral.

=== Clock ===
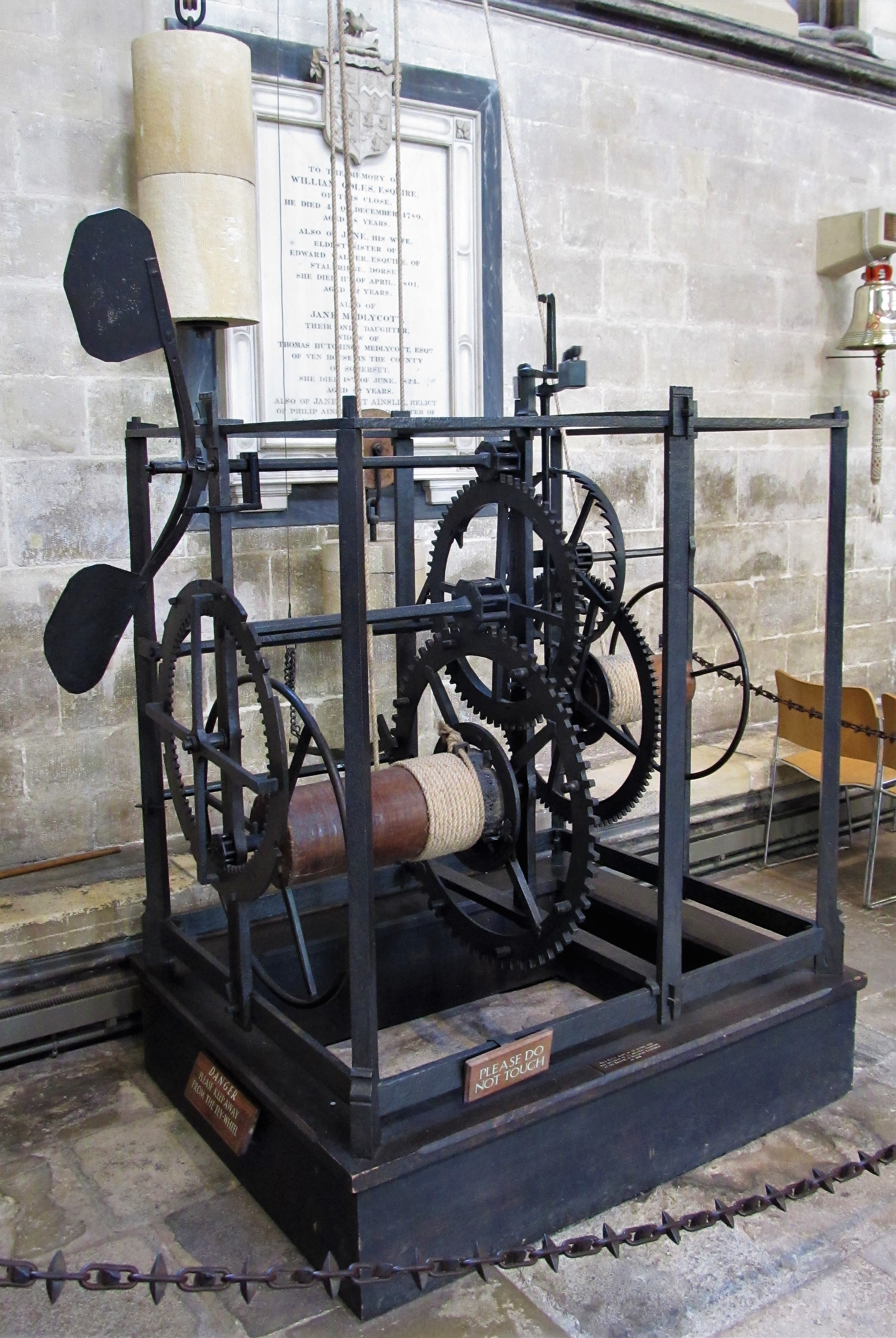
The medieval clock

The Salisbury Cathedral clock, which dates from about AD 1386, is supposedly the oldest working modern clock in the world. The clock has no face; all clocks of that date rang out the hours on a bell. It was originally in a bell tower that was demolished in 1792. Following this demolition, the clock was moved to the Cathedral Tower, where it was in operation until 1884. The clock was then placed in storage and forgotten until it was discovered in an attic of the cathedral in 1928. It was repaired and restored to working order in 1956, and is now displayed in the nave. In 2007, remedial work and repairs were carried out.

=== Cathedral Close ===
The cathedral close surrounds the cathedral, with the largest area to its western side. The close itself is bounded by Broad Walk and the West Walk, with the larger boundaries comprising North Walk, Bishops Walk, with Exeter Street to its east, and De Vaux Place to the south. The close contains a large number of listed buildings. The size of the close, Britain's largest, and the range of historic buildings within it, make it "unrivalled in Britain in terms of scale and beauty". Pevsner describes it as "the most beautiful of England's closes". The close has a preservation society dedicated to its protection. Entry is from the High Street through the North Gate, listed at Grade I. The High Street ends at Choristers Square which has seven buildings listed at Grade I: Mompesson House, now owned by the National Trust and operated as a museum, and its fronting wall and gates; the College of Matrons; the walls, gates and piers to Nos. 39 to 46; Hemingsby House; Wren Hall; and Braybrooke House. Grade II* listed buildings on the High Street and in Choristers Square include: Nos. 48, 48A, 50 and 50A, which flank the North Gate; 51, 52 and 53A; Nos. 55 and 55A; a former stable block; and the Hungerford Chantry. Grade II listed buildings on the square include: the walls and gates to No. 54; No. 55; Nos. 56A, B, and C; Nos. 57, 57A and 57B; and No. 58; and a K6 telephone kiosk.

The close proper is bounded by the West Walk and the Broad Walk. It contains six Grade I listed buildings; The King's House, which is now home of Salisbury Museum; Myles Place, No. 68, and its fronting walls; the Walton Canonry; the Leaden Hall and the South Gate. There are also six buildings listed Grade II*: The Wardrobe, which houses a military museum; Arundells, the former home of Edward Heath; the North Canonry and Gatehouse; the Old Deanery; Nos. 68A and 73; and De Vaux House. There are 19 Grade II listed buildings in the close. These include: the gates and stables to Arundells; the gates and garden house at The North Canonry, No. 60; the College of Sarum St Michael, and its gates; urns in the garden of No. 68; the gates and walling to No. 69; the lodges, gates and walls to No. 70; Nos. 71, 71A and 71B and their boundary walls; the South Canonry; No. 72 The Close; and Nos. 1-7 De Vaux Place.

Between De Vaux Place and the cathedral stands Salisbury Cathedral School, the main building of which, originally the Bishop's Palace, is listed at Grade I. The school lodge, and its adjoining wall, as well as a wall opposite surrounding the cathedral lawn, are all listed at Grade II. Continuing north along Bishop's Walk are five more listed structures; No. 5, The Close, listed II*, and its garden wall and bollards, both listed at Grade II; and the Diocesan Registry, and The Deanery, both listed at Grade II*. The eastern boundary of the close follows Exeter Street, and contains four listed structures, all at Grade I. These are: the boundary wall itself; Bishops Gate and St Anne's Gate; and Malmesbury House.

The northern end of the close terminates with the North Walk. This has one Grade I listed building, Sarum College, at No. 19, The Close. There are 23 Grade II* buildings: Nos. 8, 9, 11, 12, 14 and 14A, 16 to 18 inclusive, 20 and 21, 23 to 27 inclusive, 29, 30, 31, 33 to 36 inclusive, and 38. Buildings listed Grade II include: No. 10; the stableyard surface and gates to No. 11; No. 13; the forecourt walls to Malmesbury House; the garden walls and gateway to No. 16, two sets of walls at No. 17, the walls at Nos. 18 and 19, railings and gates at; the stables to Nos. 21 and 21A, its gate piers, its garden wall, and a commemorative arch set into the wall; No. 22; the railings to Nos. 25 and 26; No. 28; the railings to No. 31 and the wall to Nos. 32 and 33; the railings to Nos. 36A and 36B and 37.

== Depictions in art, literature and television ==
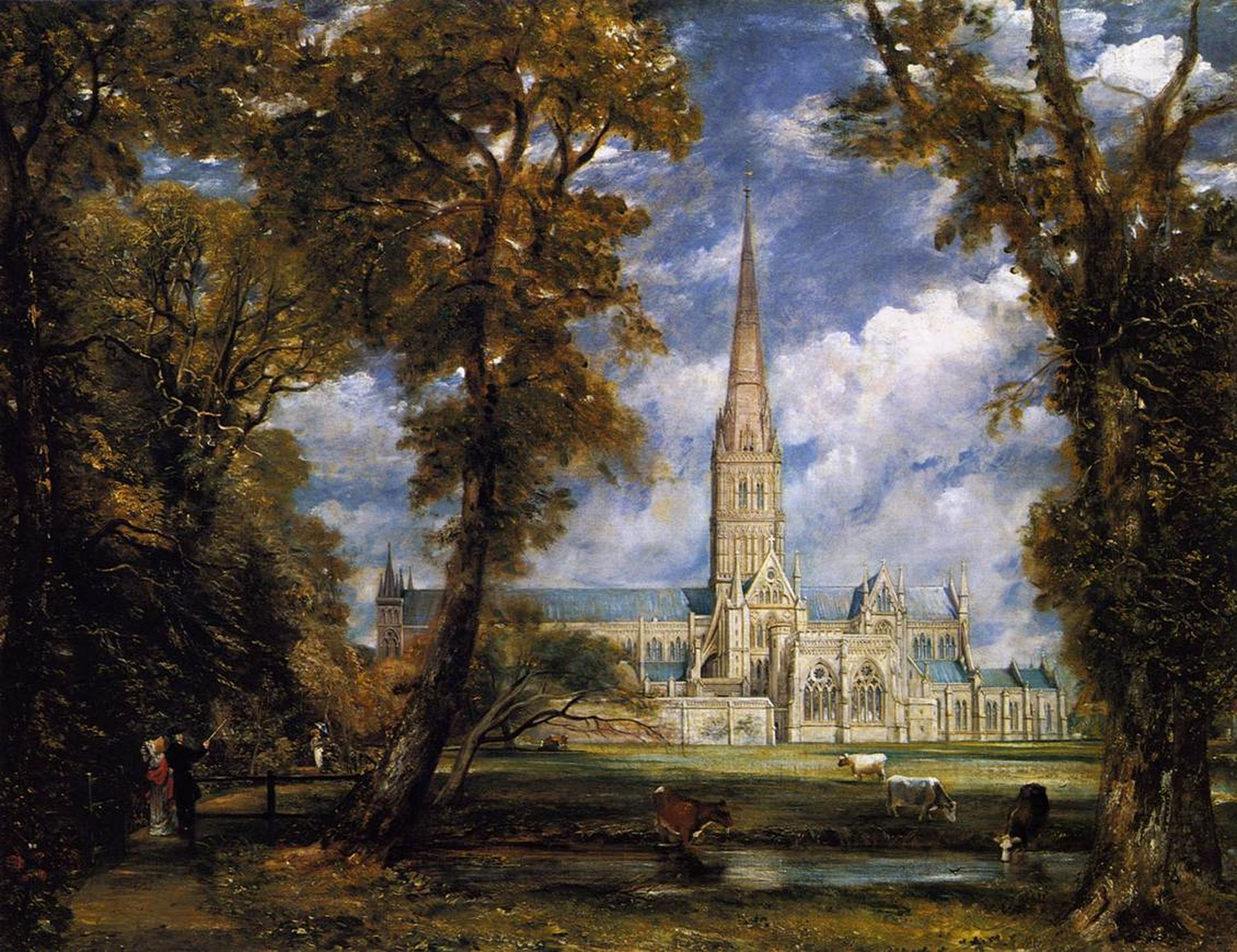
Salisbury Cathedral by John Constable, c. 1825

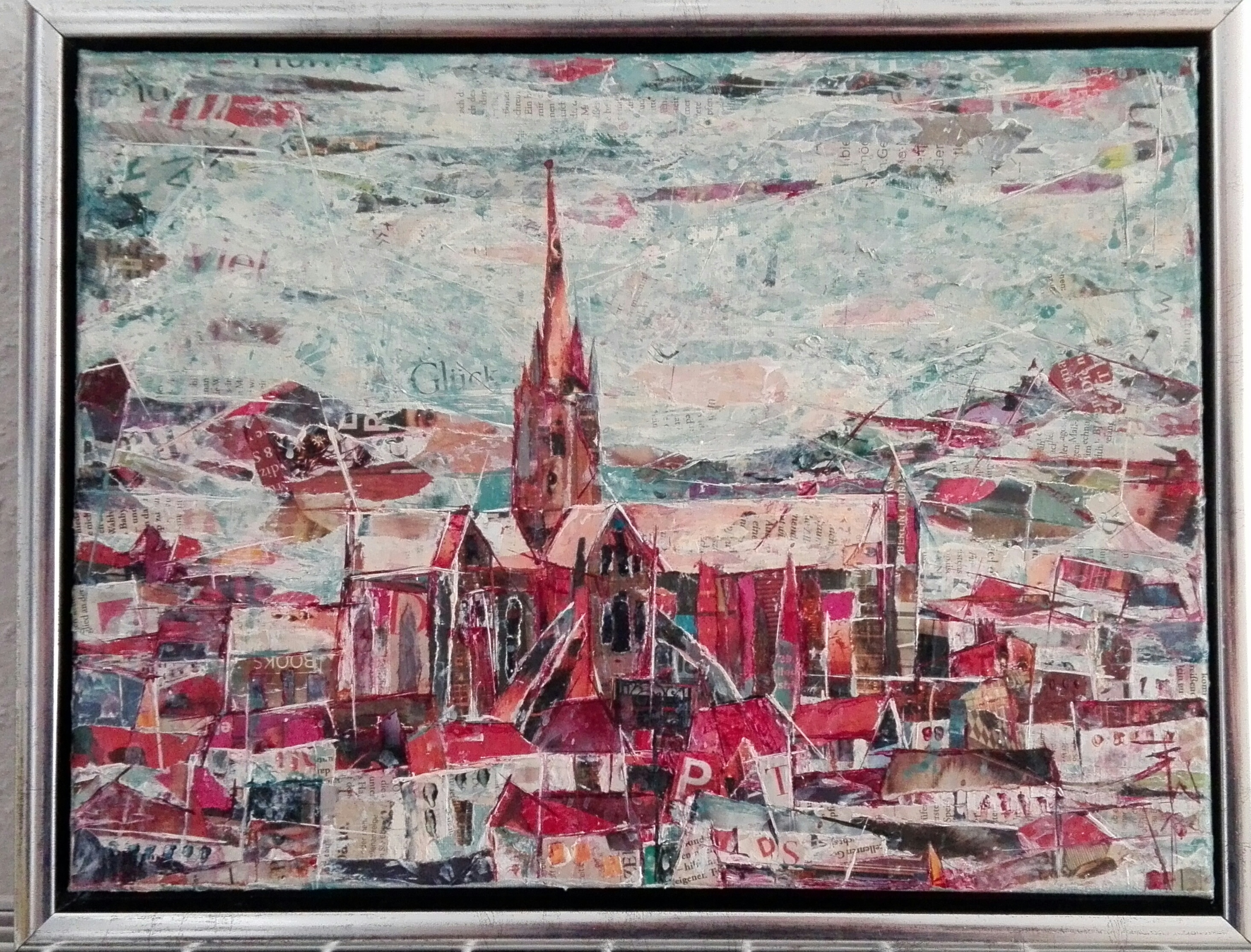
"Salisbury cathedral" (2018) by Stephan Wolf

The cathedral is the subject of a famous painting by John Constable. As a gesture of appreciation for John Fisher, Bishop of Salisbury, who commissioned this painting, Constable included the bishop and his wife in the canvas (bottom left). The view depicted in the painting has changed very little in almost two centuries.

The cathedral is apparently the inspiration for William Golding's novel The Spire, in which the fictional Dean Jocelin makes the building of a cathedral spire his life's work. The construction of the cathedral is an important plot point in Edward Rutherfurd's historical novel Sarum, which explores the historical settlement of the Salisbury area. The cathedral has been mentioned by the author Ken Follett as one of two models for the fictional Kingsbridge Cathedral in his historical novel The Pillars of the Earth. It was also used for some external shots in the 2010 miniseries based on Follett's book and was shown as it is today in the final scene. Another mention of this cathedral was made by Jonathan Swift in Gulliver's Travels, part II, chapter IV, making a comparison between its spire and the tower of the main temple of Lorbrulgrud, Brobdingnag's capital.

In 1990, Channel 4 marked the official launch of its NICAM stereo service with a live broadcast of Mahler's 8th Symphony from the cathedral. The cathedral was the setting for the 2005 BBC television drama Mr. Harvey Lights a Candle, written by Rhidian Brook and directed by Susanna White. Kevin McCloud climbed the cathedral in his programme called Don't Look Down! in which he climbed high structures to conquer his fear of heights. The cathedral was the subject of a Channel 4 Time Team programme which was first broadcast on 8 February 2009. The cathedral was briefly featured in episodes of the second season of the 2024 Netflix show The Gentlemen.

== Diocese, dean and chapter ==
The cathedral is the mother church of the Diocese of Salisbury and is the seat of the Bishop of Salisbury. The Right Reverend Stephen Lake was installed as bishop in 2022. The Dean is Nicholas Papadopulos, installed in 2018. The Canon Precentor is Anna Macham, installed in 2019, the Canon Chancellor is Kenneth Padley, installed in 2026 and the Canon Treasurer is Neil Traynor, installed in 2026.

== Burials ==
Notable burials include:

- William Longespée, 3rd Earl of Salisbury, (c. 1165–1226)
- Lady Katherine Grey, Countess of Hertford (1540–1568)
- Saint Osmund, Bishop of Salisbury (1078–1099)
- Roger of Salisbury, Bishop of Salisbury (1102–1139)
- Josceline de Bohon, Bishop of Salisbury (1142–1184)
- Robert de Bingham, Bishop of Salisbury (1229–1246)
- Giles of Bridport, Bishop of Salisbury (1256–1262)
- Walter de la Wyle, Bishop of Salisbury (1263–1271)
- Nicholas Longespee, Bishop of Salisbury (1291–1297)
- Simon of Ghent, Bishop of Salisbury (1297–1315)
- Roger Martival, Bishop of Salisbury (1315–1330)
- Walter Hungerford, 1st Baron Hungerford (1378–1449)
- Richard Mitford, Bishop of Salisbury (1395–1407)
- Robert Hungerford, 2nd Baron Hungerford (1409–1459)
- Robert Hungerford, Lord Moleyns and 3rd Baron Hungerford (1431–1464)
- John Cheyne, Baron Cheyne (c. 1442–1499)
- Richard Beauchamp, Bishop of Salisbury (1450–1482)
- John Blyth, Bishop of Salisbury (1493–1499)
- John Doget, Renaissance humanist (died 1501)
- Edmund Audley, Bishop of Salisbury (1501–1524)
- Edward Seymour, 1st Earl of Hertford (1539–1621), nephew of queen-consort Jane Seymour
- Thomas Gorges, (1536–1610) and wife Helena, Marchioness of Northampton, (1548/1549–1635)
- John Jewel, Bishop of Salisbury (1559–1571)
- Edmund Gheast, Bishop of Salisbury (1571–1577)
- Mary Sidney (1561–1621), writer and patron
- William Herbert, 3rd Earl of Pembroke (1580–1630), politician and courtier, buried in a family vault in front of the altar
- Philip Herbert, 4th Earl of Pembroke
- Philip Herbert, 7th Earl of Pembroke
- Michael Wise (1648–1687), organist and composer
- Alexander Hyde, Bishop of Salisbury (1665–1667)
- Seth Ward, Bishop of Salisbury (1667–1689)
- John Seymour, 4th Duke of Somerset (before 1646–1675)
- Charles Seymour, 6th Duke of Somerset in the Seymour Chapel (1662–1748)
- John Thomas, Bishop of Salisbury (1761–1766)
- Edward Heath, former British Prime Minister (1970–1974)
- William Gilbert (1804–1890), author and father of dramatist W.S. Gilbert of Gilbert and Sullivan

== Music ==
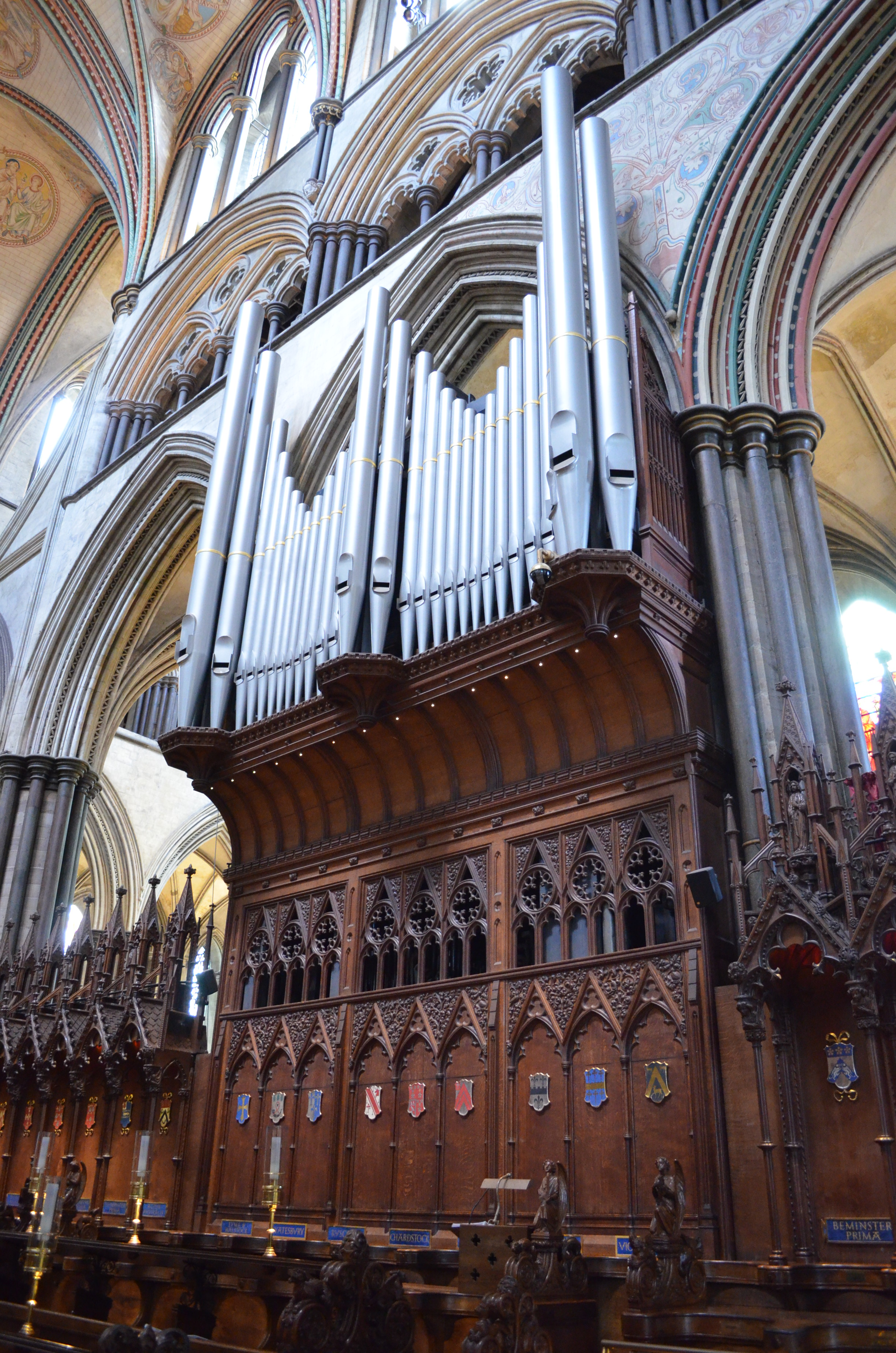
The organ, by Henry Willis & Sons (1877)

=== Organ ===
Over the course of its history there have been several organs in the cathedral. Of particular interest are the two fine four-manual instruments, the first by Renatus Harris (c. 1652–1724), which was replaced at the end of the 18th century, and the current organ, whose present fame has eclipsed the reputation of the former.

The four-manual instrument by Harris had been installed in 1710. The abundance of reed stops was typical of Harris' instruments and bears witness to the influence of the classical French organ. The instrument, not only spectacular in style but also of good quality, had remained practically unaltered (beyond occasional repairs) for nearly 80 years, until it was replaced at the same time as the cathedral was "restored" by James Wyatt between 1789 and 1792: the Bishop had convinced George III to furnish the cathedral with a new instrument once the work was complete.

This organ, by Samuel Green, was presented by the king in 1792 and was installed on top of the stone screen, which, unusually, did not divide the choir from the nave, but rather came from an unknown location in the cathedral. The organ was later taken out and moved to St Thomas's Church. When the new Willis organ was installed, its distinct sound from 55 powerfully-voiced stops, directly in the choir with little casework, was quite a contrast to Green's more gentle 23-stop instrument.

The present-day instrument was built in 1877 by Henry Willis & Sons. Walter Alcock, who was organist of the cathedral from 1916, oversaw a strictly faithful restoration of the famous Father Willis organ, completed in 1934, even going to such lengths as to refuse to allow parts of the instrument to leave the cathedral in case any unauthorised tonal alterations were made without his knowledge, while allowing some discrete additions in the original style of the organ (as well as modernisation of the organ's actions) by Henry Willis III, the grandson of Father Willis. The instrument was extensively restored between 2019 and 2020.

=== Organists ===
It is recorded that in 1463 John Kegewyn was organist of Salisbury Cathedral. Among the notable organists of more recent times have been a number of composers and well-known performers including Bertram Luard-Selby, Charles Frederick South, Walter Alcock, David Valentine Willcocks, Douglas Albert Guest, Christopher Dearnley, Richard Godfrey Seal and the BBC presenter Simon Lole.

=== Choir ===
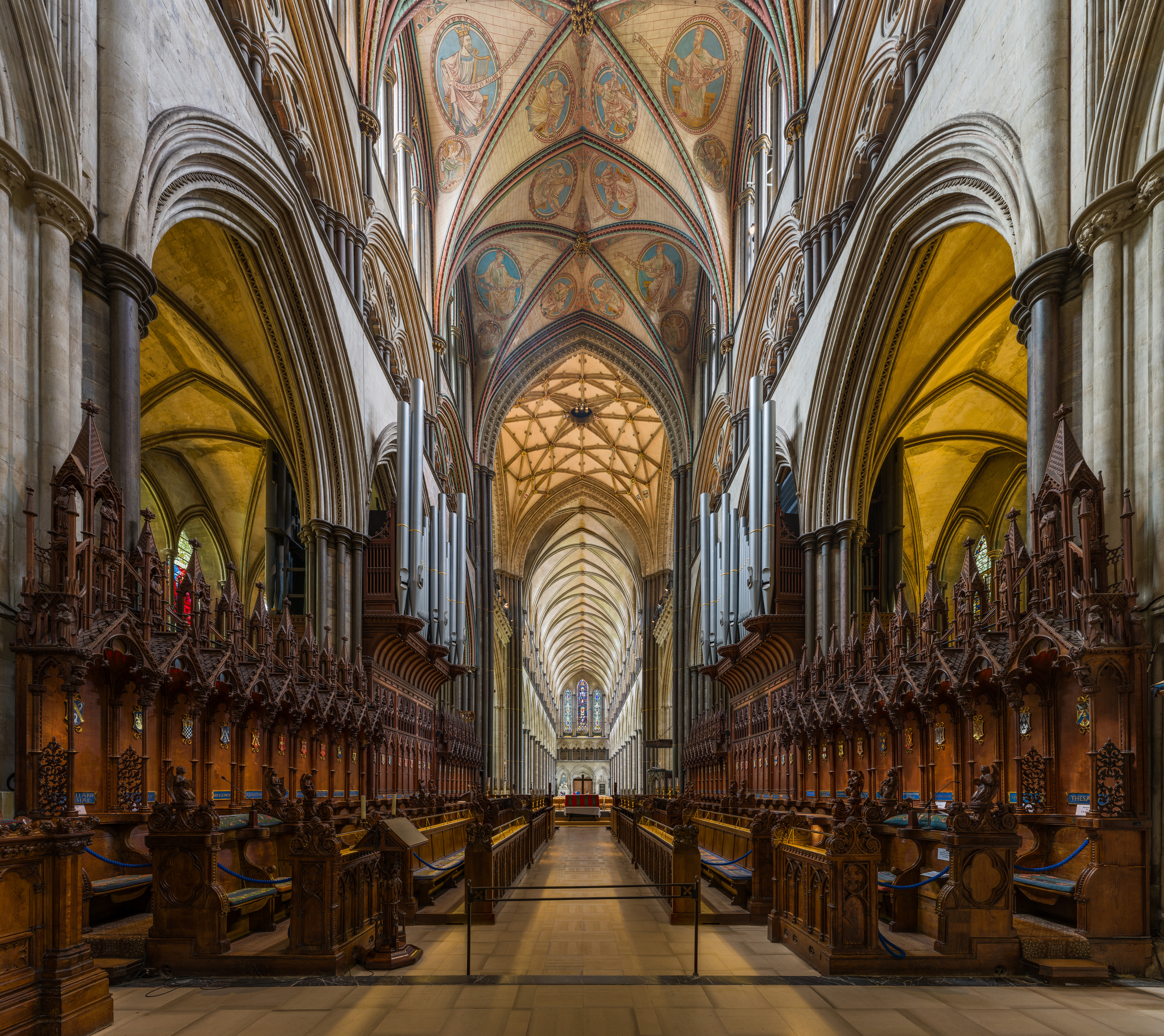
The choir stalls

Salisbury Cathedral Choir holds annual auditions for boys and girls aged 7–9 years old for scholarships to Salisbury Cathedral School, which housed in the former Bishop's Palace. The boys' choir and the girls' choir (each 16 strong) sing alternate daily Evensong and Sunday Matins and Eucharist services throughout the school year. There are also many additional services during the Christian year particularly during Advent, Christmas, Holy Week, and Easter. The Advent From Darkness to Light services are the best known. Choristers come from across the country and some board. Six lay vicars (adult men) comprise the rest of the choir, singing tenor, alto and bass parts. In 1993, the cathedral was the venue for the first broadcast of Choral Evensong (the long-running BBC Radio 3 programme) to be sung by a girls' cathedral choir.

== Library ==
The cathedral library holds 193 manuscript books – 60 of them written at the first cathedral at Old Sarum – and around 12,000 early printed books. There are 43 books (incunabula) from the earliest years of printing, up to the year 1500. Significant collections include works of 16th-century theology from bishop Edmund Gheast, medical and science books from bishop Seth Ward, and 19th-century theology from dean Henry Hamilton.

In late 2024, the Friends of the Nations' Libraries raised £90,000 to purchase a 13th-century Bible, illuminated at Salisbury by the Sarum Master, which they donated to the cathedral.

== Gallery ==
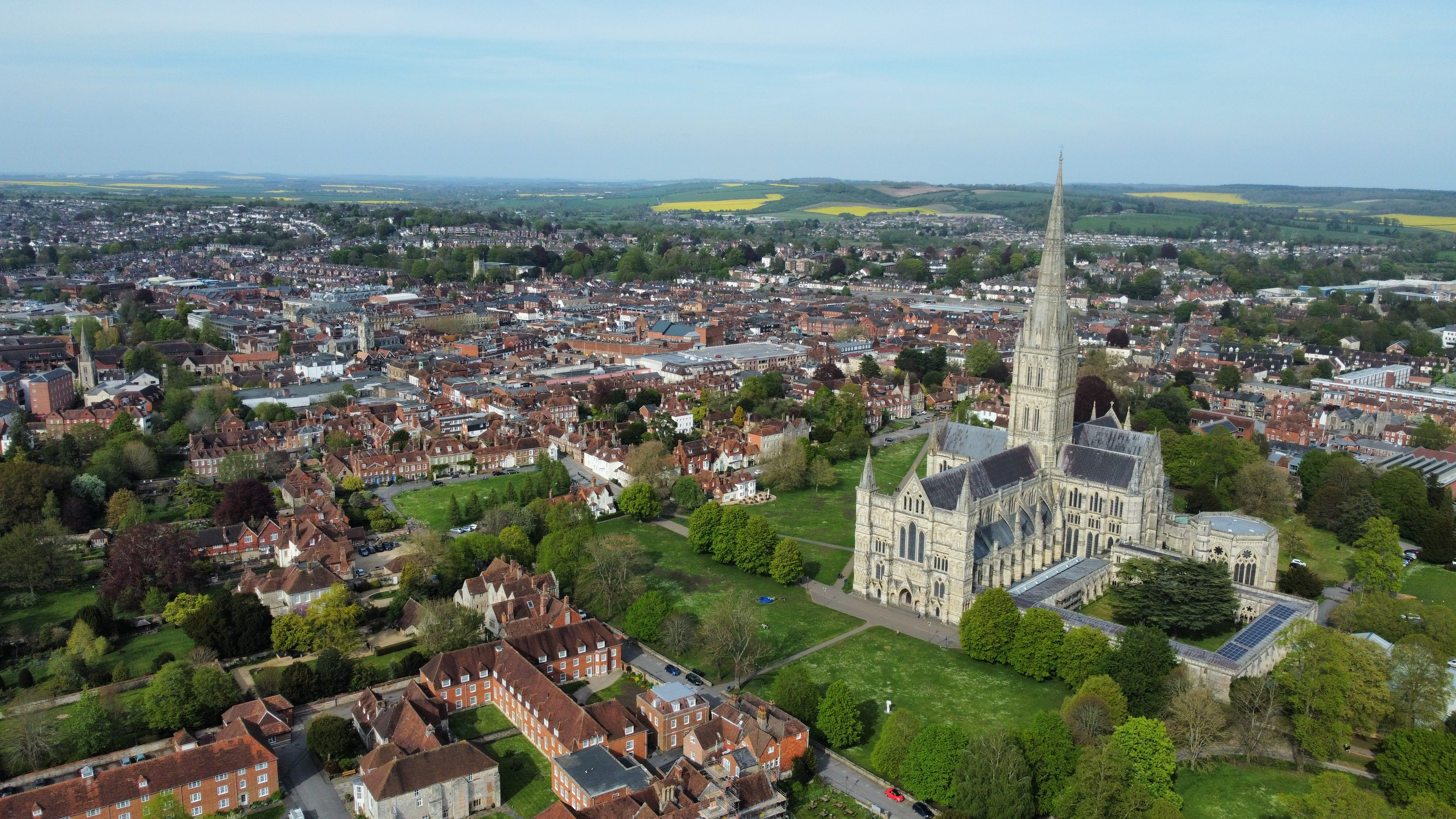
Aerial view

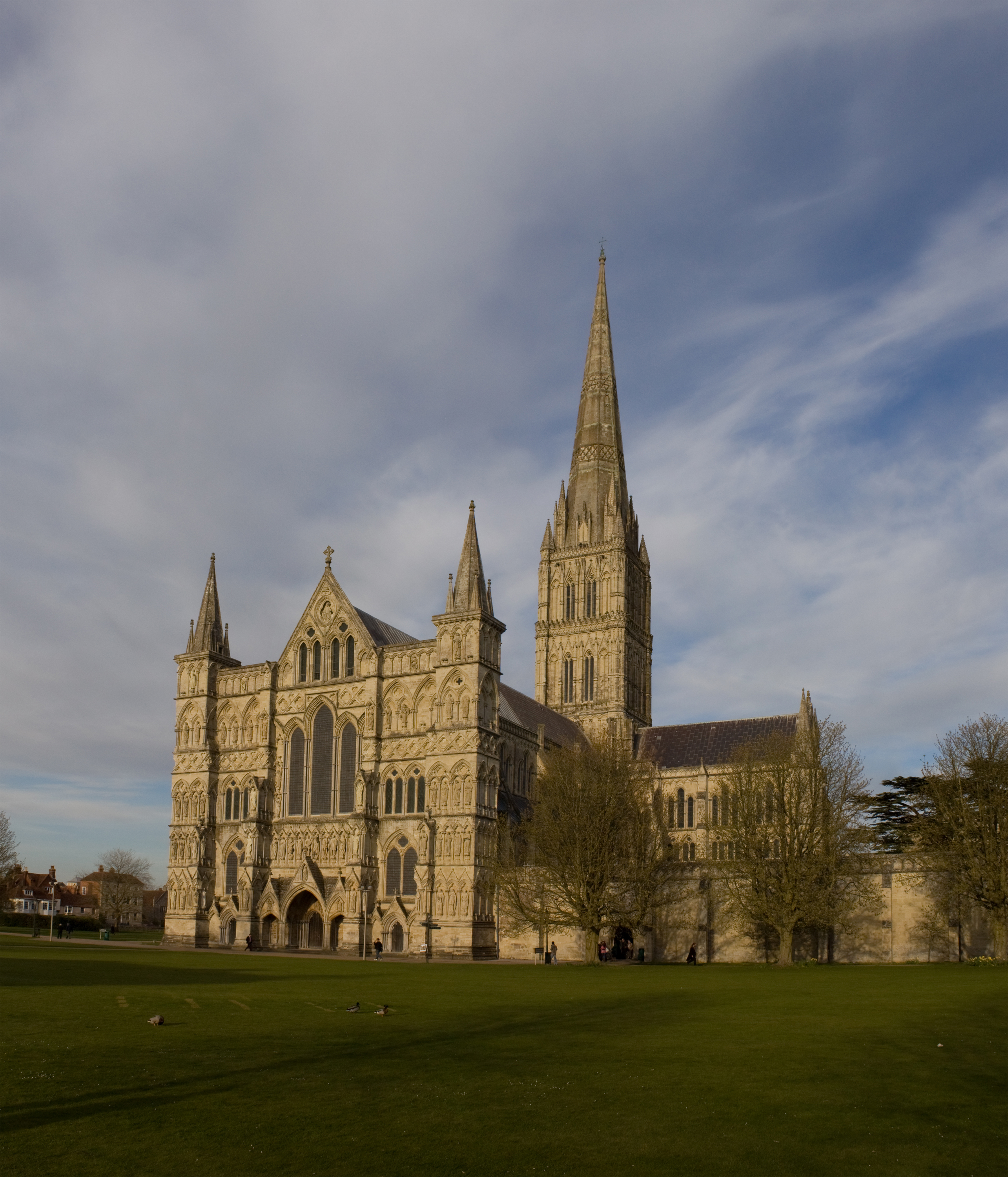
From the southwest

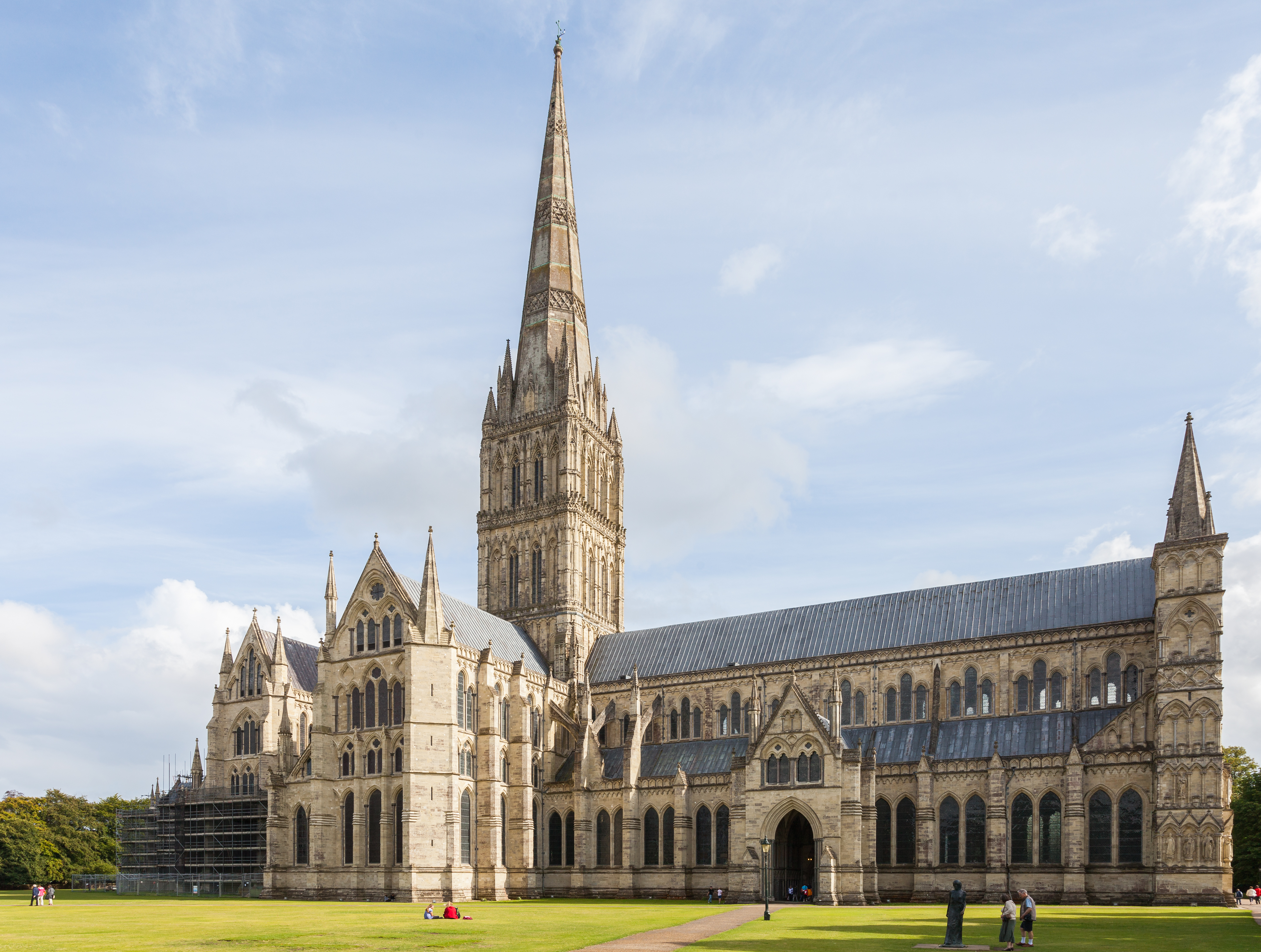
North front

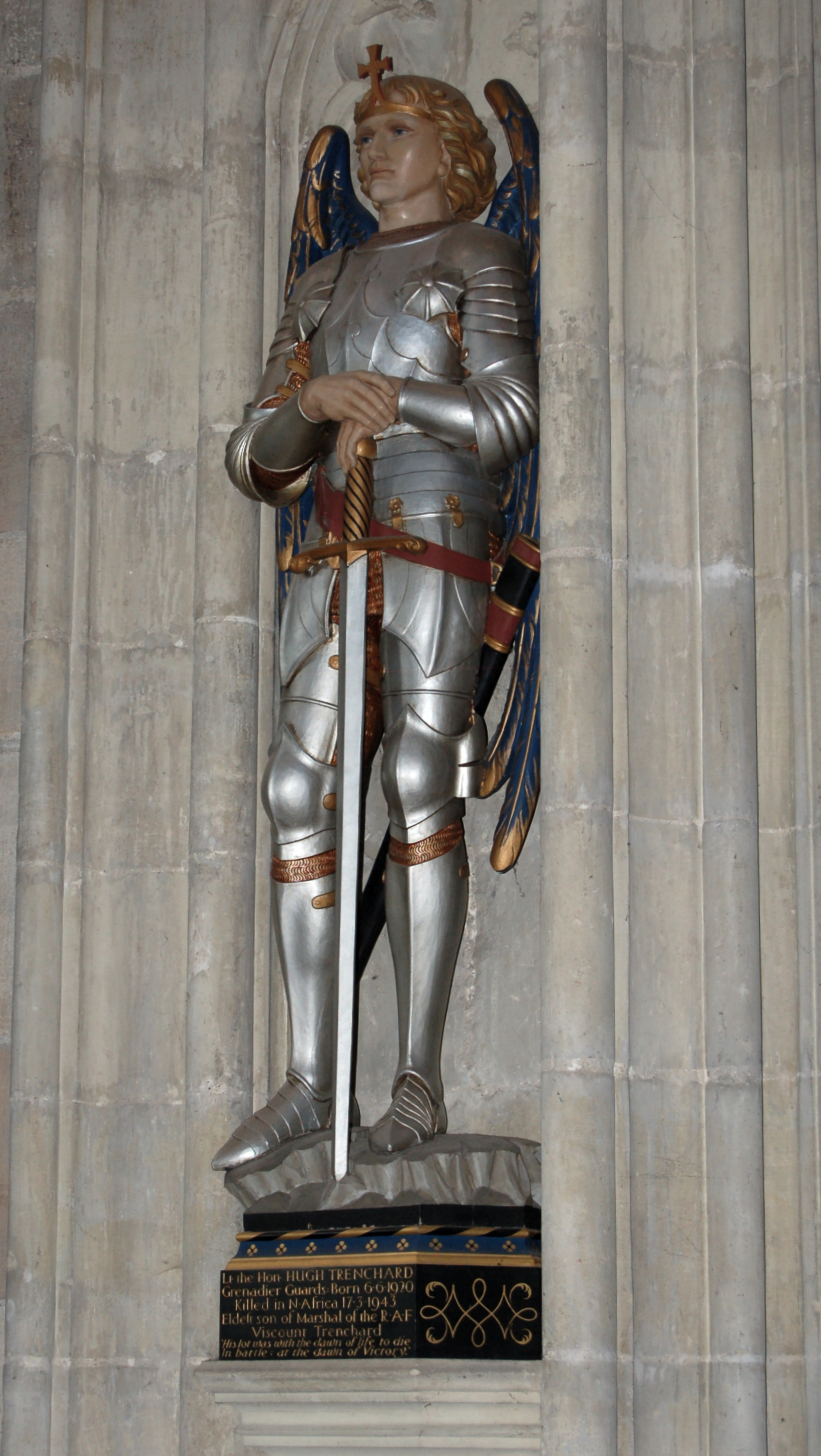
Trenchard Memorial

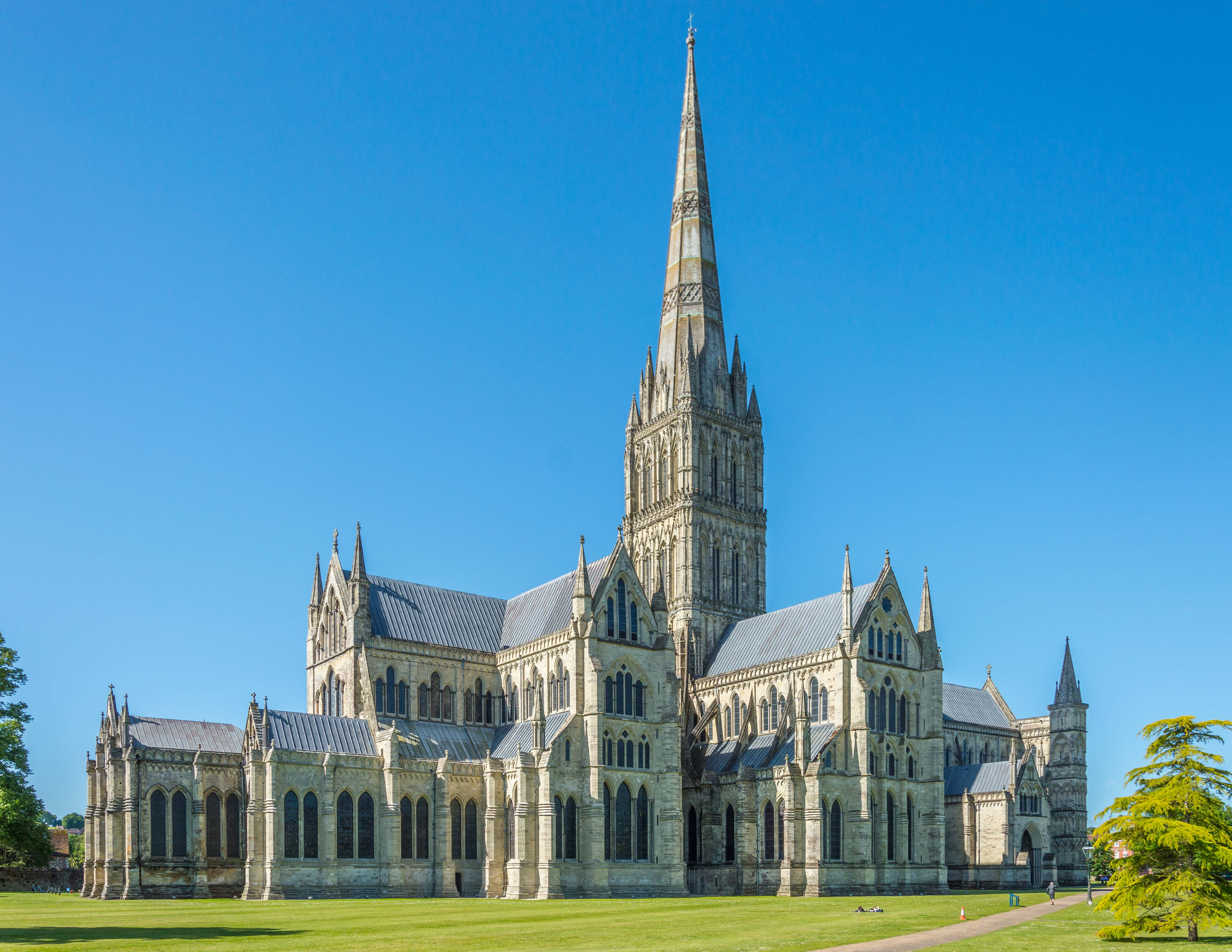
From the northeast

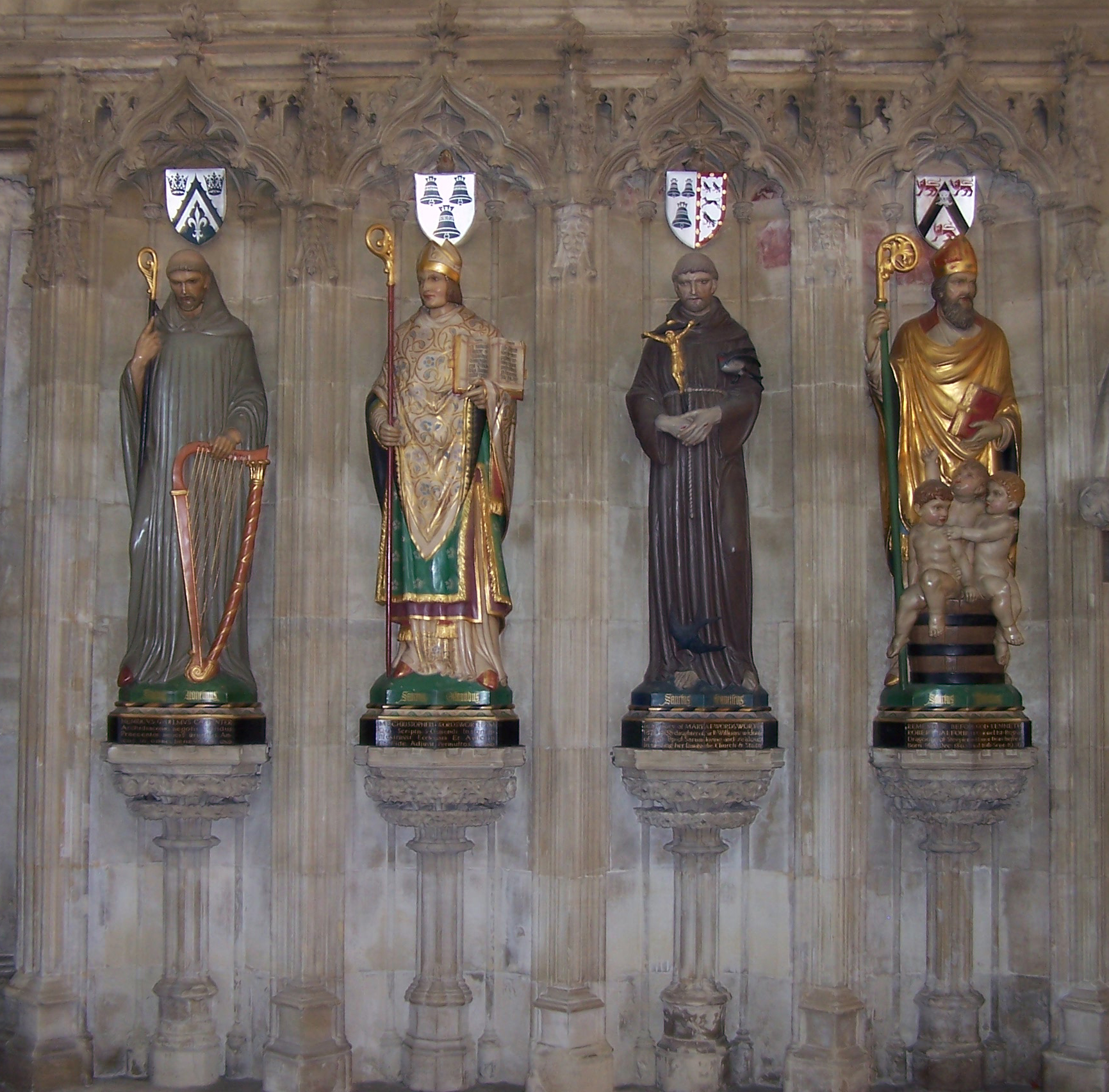
Sculptural detail

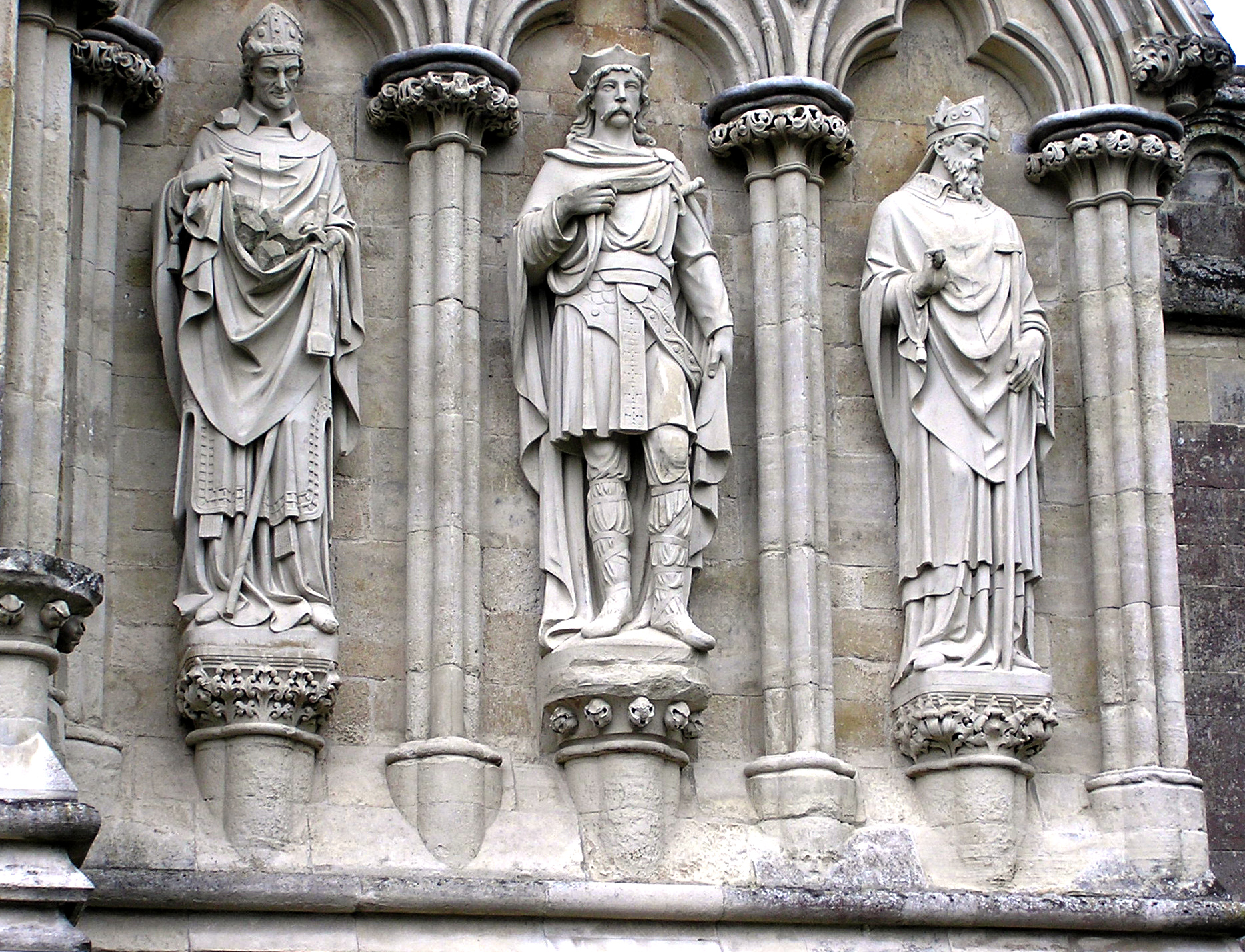
Detail from west front

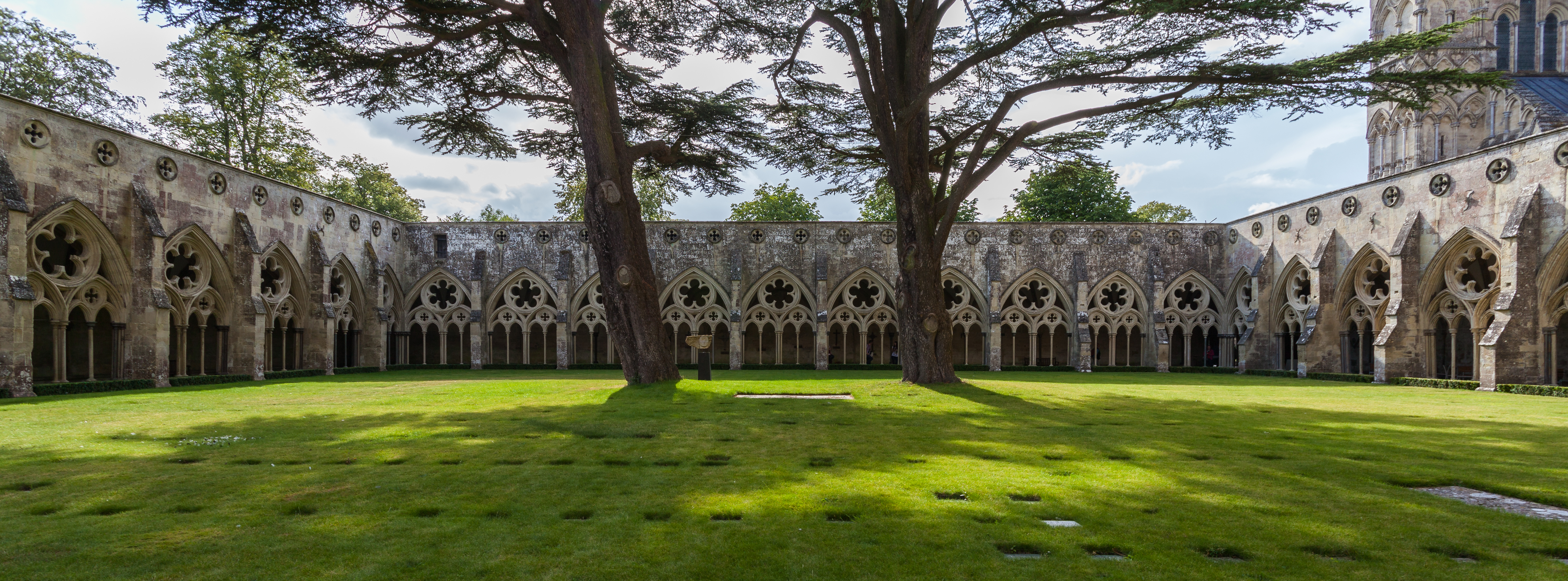
The cloisters

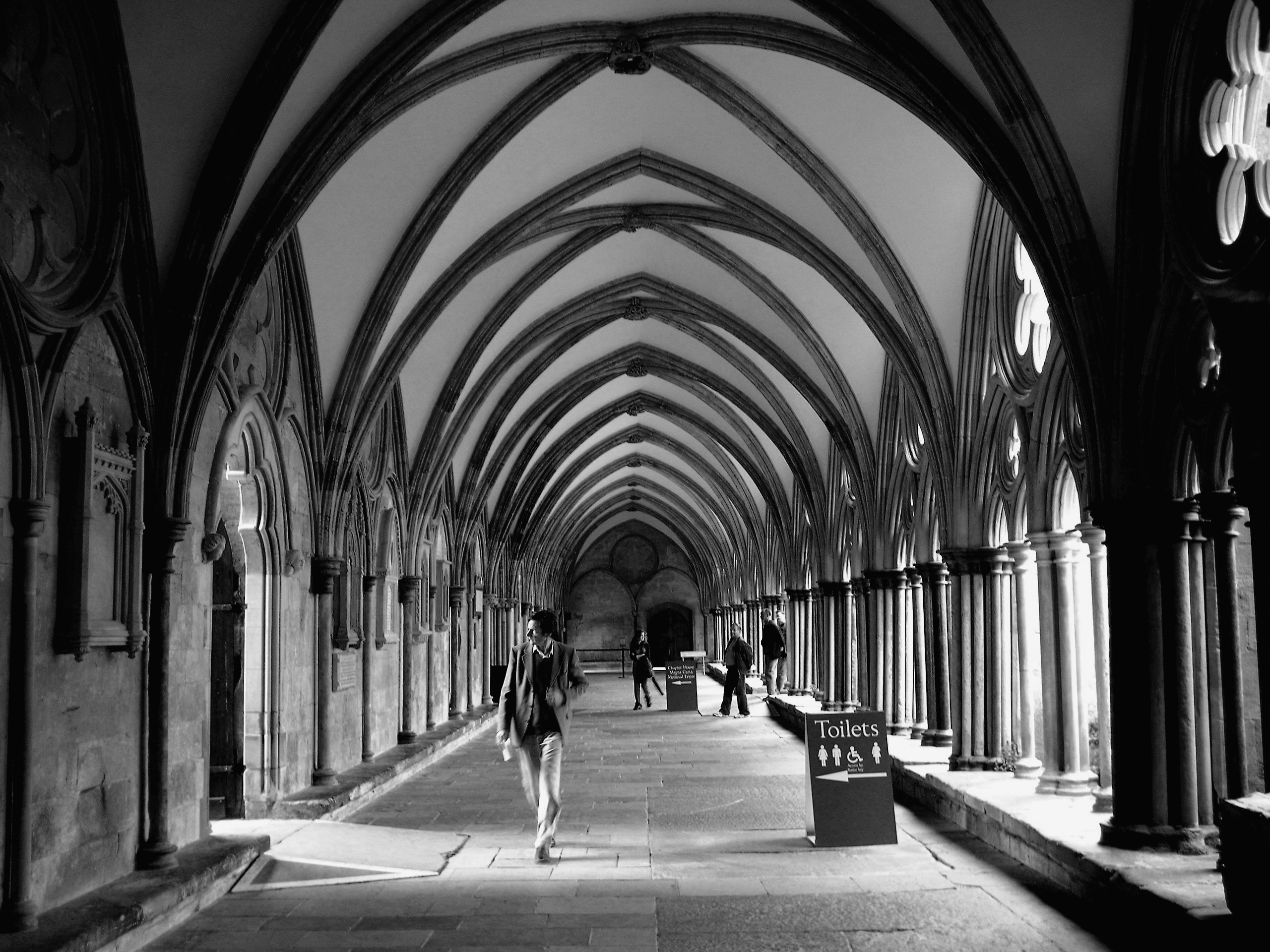
Cloister walk, east side

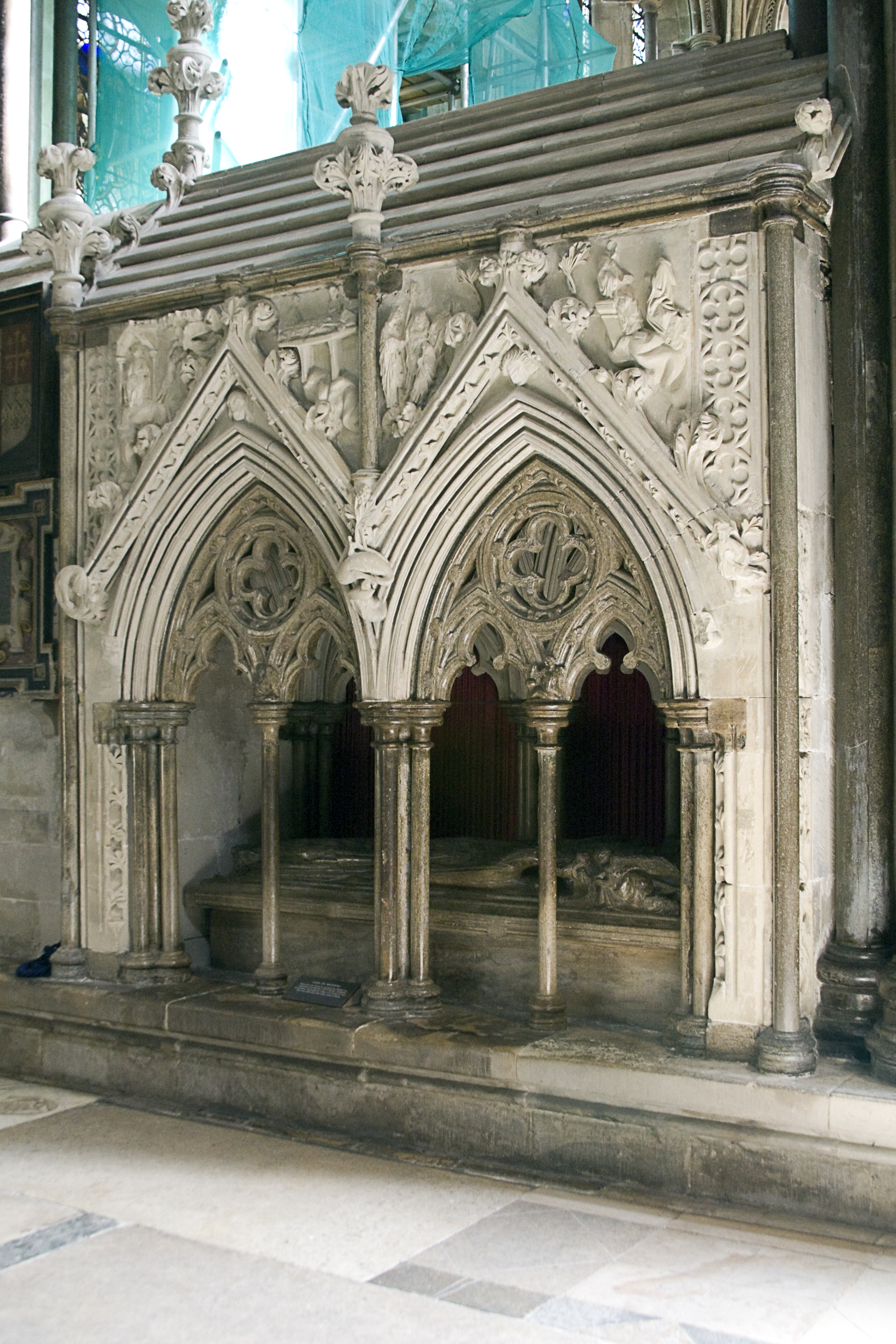
Tomb of Giles of Bridport

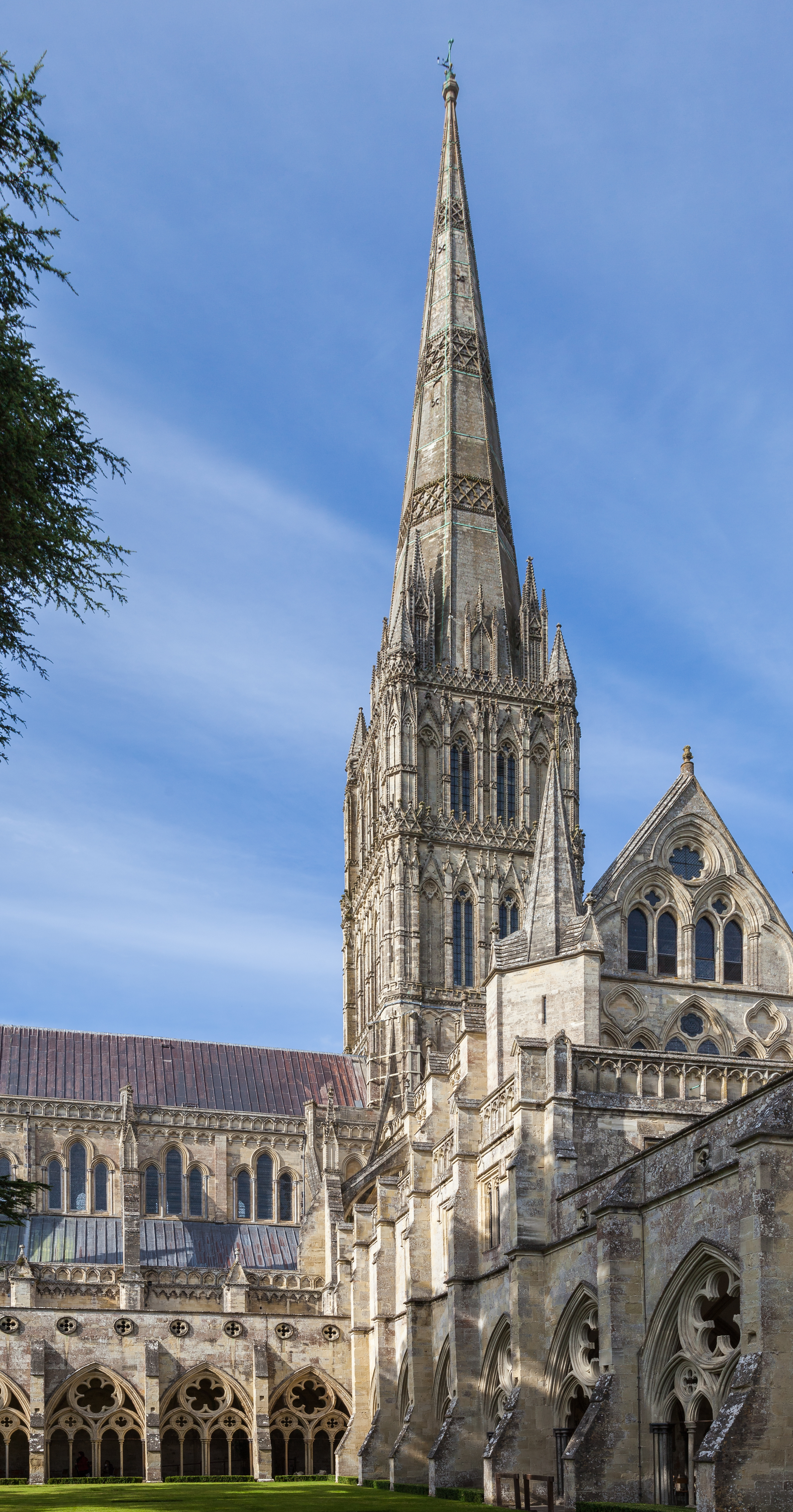
View of the spire from the cloisters

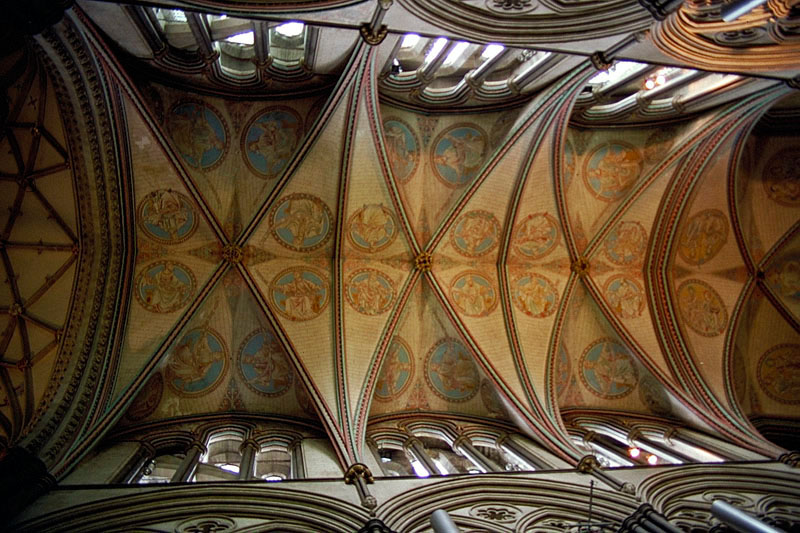
Rib vault ceiling above clerestory windows

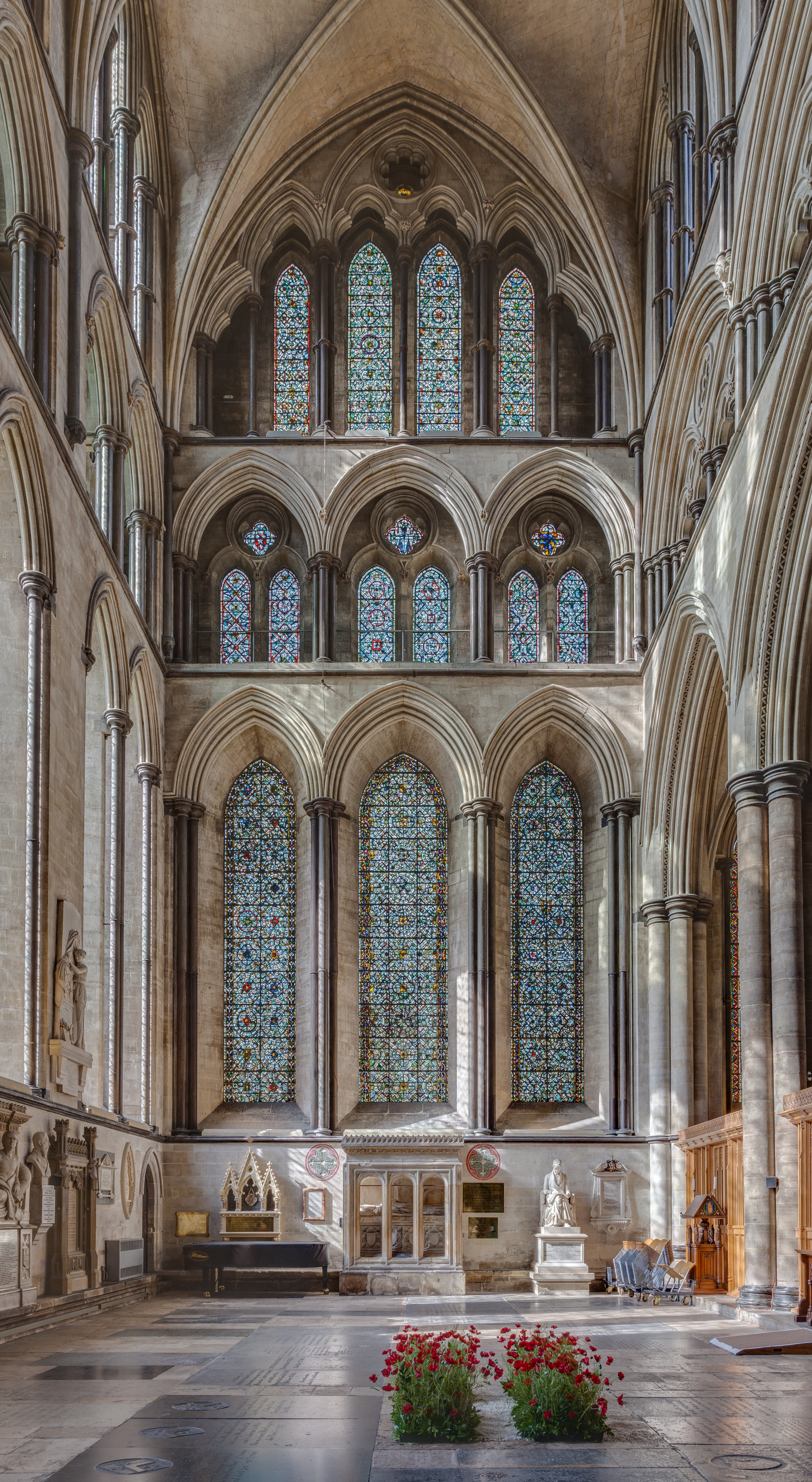
North Transept interior

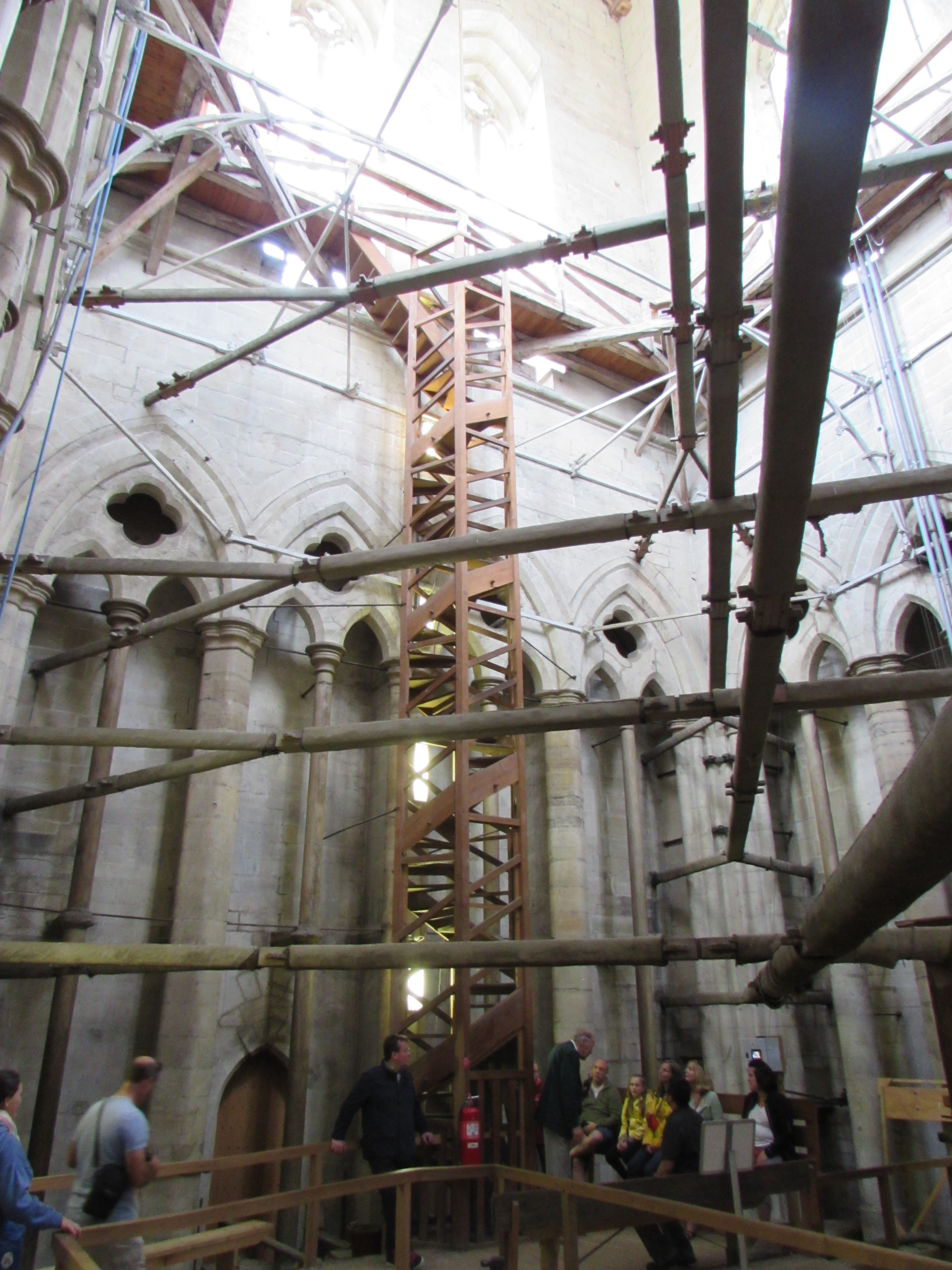
Interior of the tower

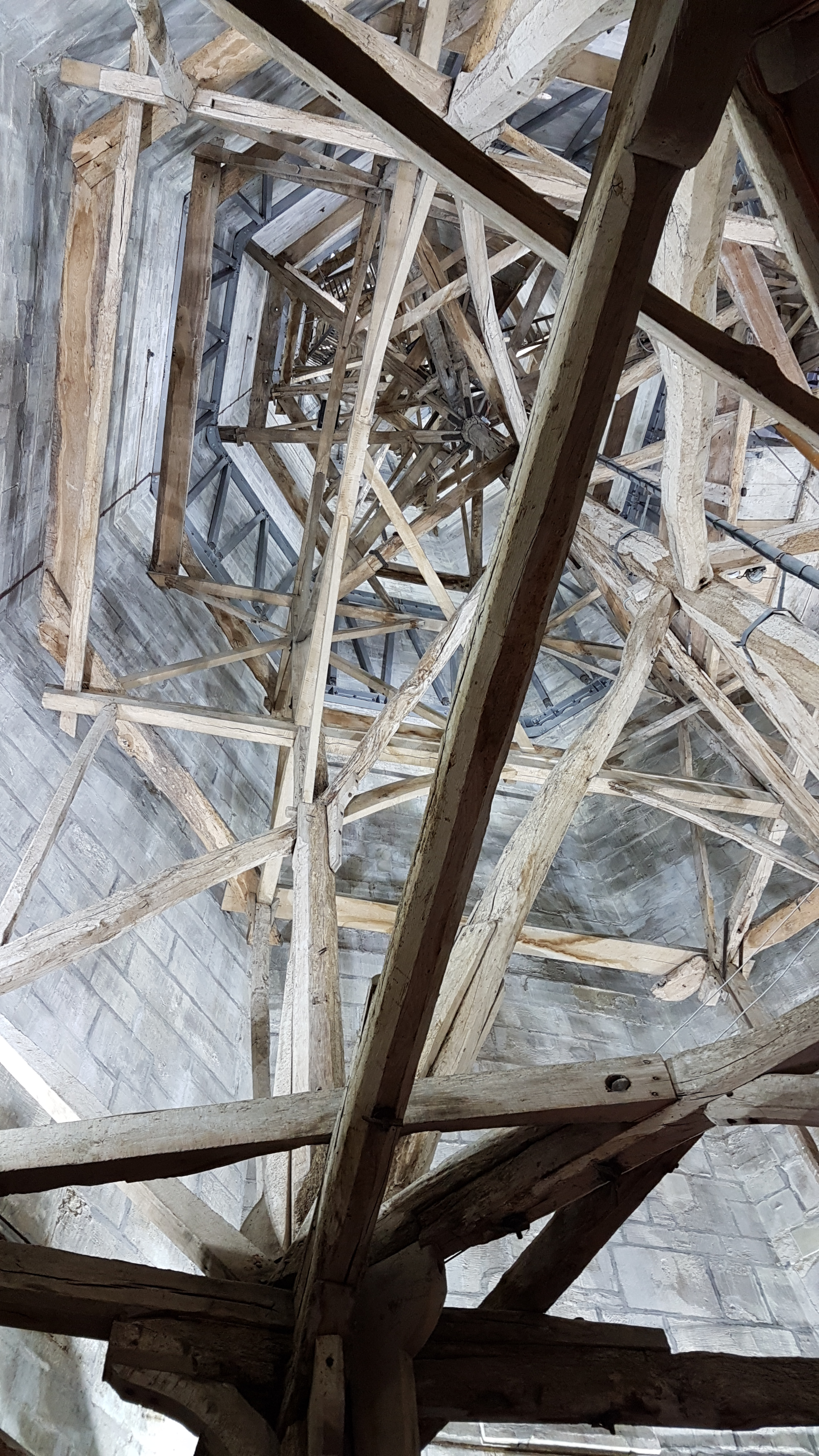
Interior of the spire

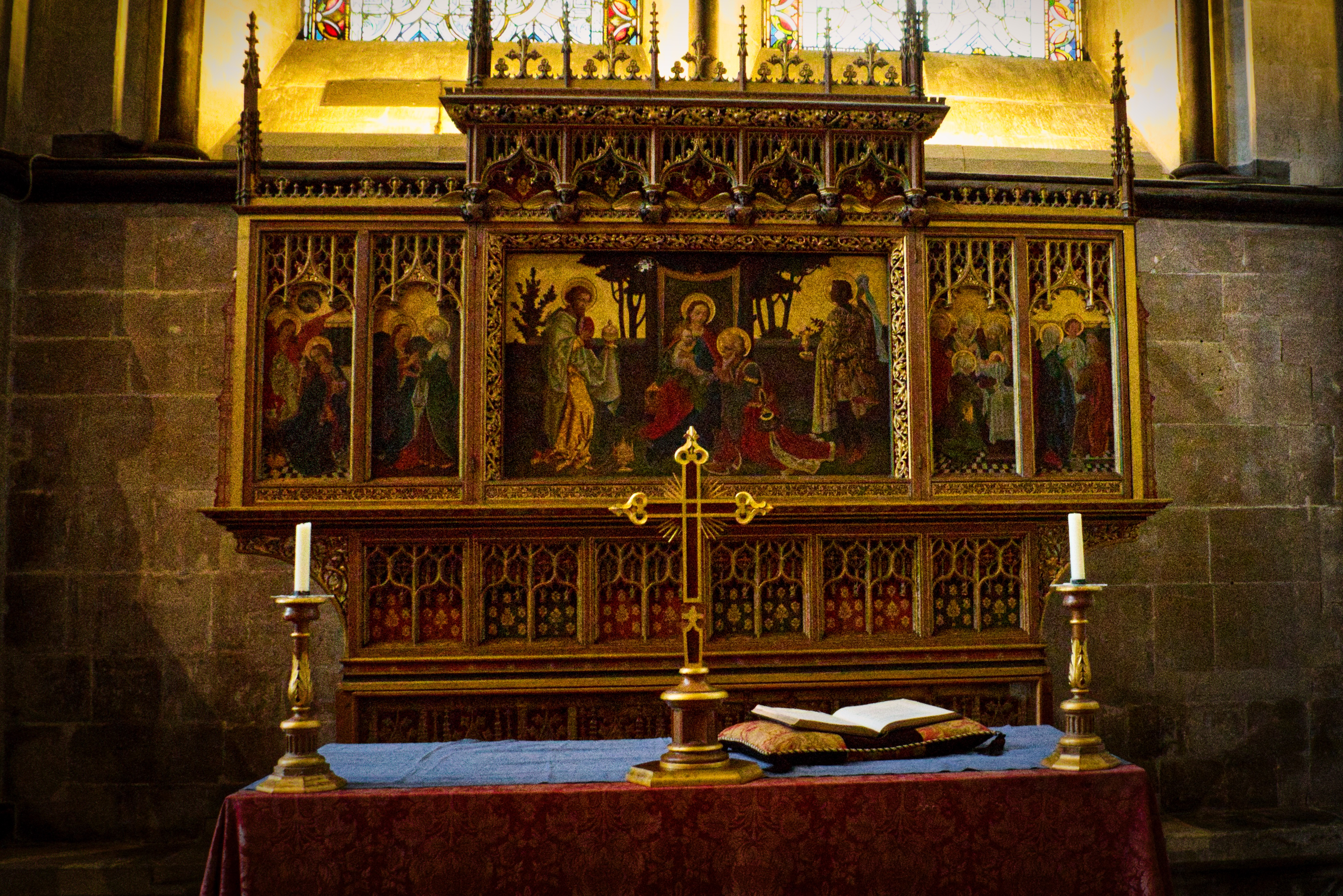
Reredos by Charles Edgar Buckeridge

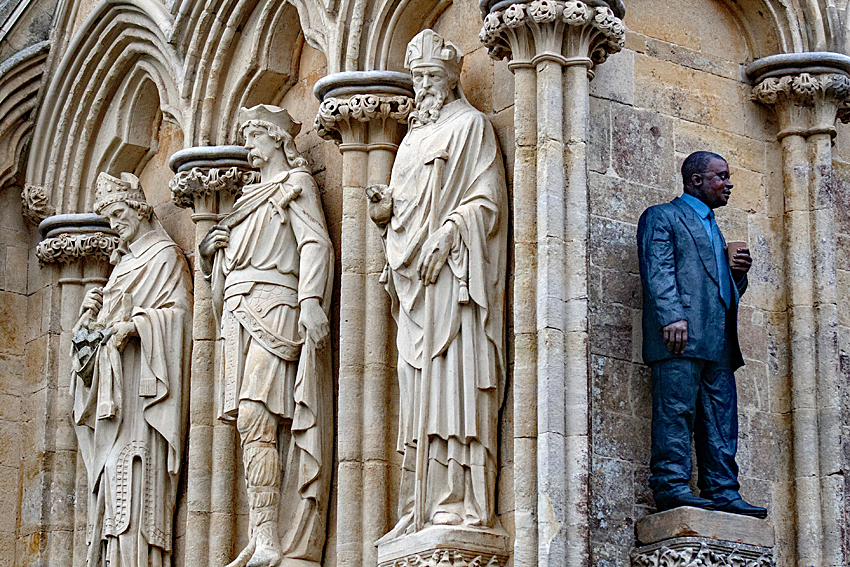
Man with coffee by Sean Henry in a spare niche at the west end of the cathedral

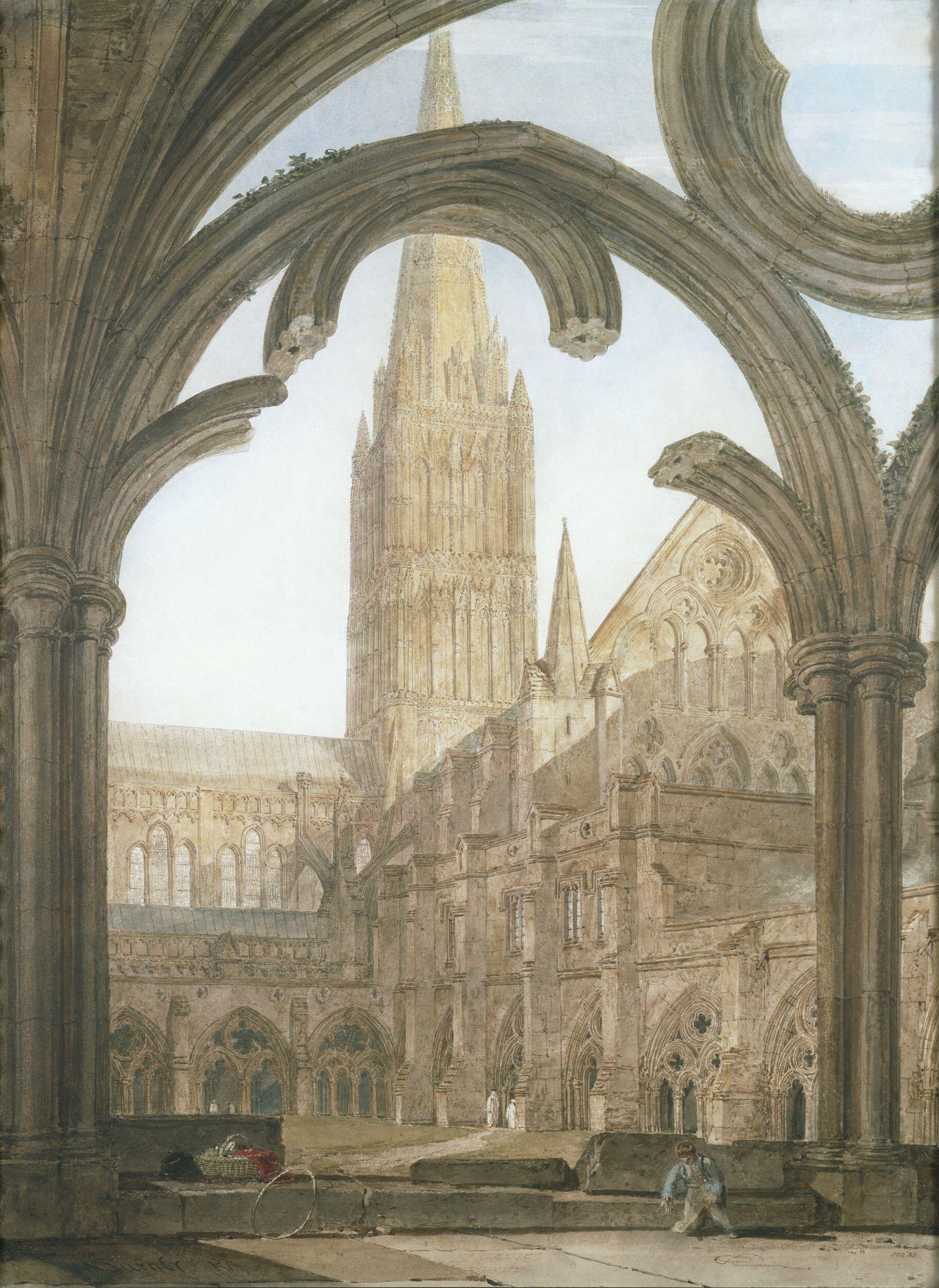
Salisbury Cathedral from the Cloisters by J.M.W. Turner, 1802

== See also ==
- Architecture of the medieval cathedrals of England
- Bishop Wordsworth's School
- English Gothic architecture
- Gothic cathedrals and churches
- List of Gothic cathedrals in Europe
- List of cathedrals in the United Kingdom
- List of tallest church buildings
- List of tallest structures built before the 20th century
- Salisbury Cathedral School
