= Charles Frederick South =

English cathedral organist

Charles Frederick South (1850 – August 1916) was a cathedral organist, who served at Salisbury Cathedral. A couple of Anglican chants by him are still in use.

== Background ==
Charles Frederick South was born on 6 February 1850 in London.

He received the support of John Stainer who wrote:

I hear on all sides of the beauty of your musical services, Mr. South seems not only to have raised them to a high standard but to have maintained them at this level. If I am correctly informed about this, do you not think it would be a nice compliment to him if you were to obtain for him the degree of Mus.Doc. from the Archbishop?

He died at his home in Salisbury in August 1916 at age 66.

== Career ==
Organist of:

- Aske's Hospital, Hoxton 1866–1868
- St Augustine's, Watling Street 1868–1883
- Salisbury Cathedral 1883–1916

Cultural offices
| Preceded by Bertram Luard-Selby | Organist and Master of the Choristers of Salisbury Cathedral; 1883-1916 | Succeeded by Walter Galpin Alcock |
