= List of Grade I listed buildings in Salisbury =

There are 38 buildings and structures listed as Grade I by Historic England in the city of Salisbury, Wiltshire, England.

Twenty-one are within the Cathedral Close. Elsewhere there are:

- 3 churches
- 2 residences
- 2 inns
- 6 buildings that had an institutional or community use when constructed
- 3 river bridges
- an ancient ruin.

Name	Location	Type	Completed (Note: The date given is the date used by Historic England as significant for the initial building or that of an important part in the structure's description.)	Date designated	Grid ref. (Note: The grid reference is based on the British national grid reference system, sometimes known as OSGB36, used by the Ordnance Survey.) Geo-coordinates	Entry number (Note: The "List Entry Number" is a unique number assigned to each listed building and scheduled monument by Historic England.)	Image
Myles Place, 68 The Close	The Close, Salisbury	Clergy House	16th century	28 February 1952	SU1411529412; 51°03′50″N 1°48′00″W	1261304	Myles Place, 68 The Close More images
91 Crane Street	Crane Street, Salisbury	House	15th century	28 February 1952	SU1422529797; 51°04′02″N 1°47′54″W	1355821	91 Crane Street More images
Ayleswade Bridge (Old Harnham Bridge)	Aylswade Road, Salisbury	Bridge	1244	28 February 1952	SU1436229096; 51°03′40″N 1°47′47″W	1273133	Ayleswade Bridge (Old Harnham Bridge) More images
Bishop's Gate	Exeter Street, Salisbury	House	C14-C15	28 February 1952	SU1451729429; 51°03′50″N 1°47′39″W	1355830	Bishop's Gate More images
Braybrooke House	The Close, Salisbury	House	C13/C14	28 February 1952	SU1413529697; 51°03′59″N 1°47′59″W	1023622	Braybrooke House More images
Cathedral Church of St Mary	The Close, Salisbury	Cathedral	1270–1279	28 February 1952	SU1430029478; 51°03′52″N 1°47′50″W	1023581	Cathedral Church of St Mary More images
Salisbury Cathedral School	The Close, Salisbury	Bishops Palace	Early 13th century	28 February 1952	SU1438529398; 51°03′49″N 1°47′46″W	1251561	Salisbury Cathedral School More images
Church House incorporating Audley House	Crane Street, Salisbury	House	C15-C16	28 February 1952	SU1416229803; 51°04′03″N 1°47′57″W	1023638	Church House incorporating Audley House More images
Church of St Lawrence	Stratford-sub-Castle	Church	Early 13th century	12 October 1972	SU1303032620; 51°05′34″N 1°48′55″W	1272953	Church of St Lawrence More images
Church of St Martin	St Martin's Church Street, Salisbury	Church	13th century	28 February 1952	SU1502629597; 51°03′56″N 1°47′13″W	1259041	Church of St Martin More images
Church of St Thomas	St Thomas's Square, Salisbury	Parish Church	founded 1220	28 February 1952	SU1433229985; 51°04′08″N 1°47′49″W	1273123	Church of St Thomas More images
The King's House	The Close, Salisbury	House	C13/C14	28 February 1952	SU1410129455; 51°03′51″N 1°48′01″W	1355814	The King's House More images
Crane Bridge	Crane Bridge Road, Salisbury	Bridge	15th century	28 February 1952	SU1414829835; 51°04′04″N 1°47′58″W	1240793	Crane Bridge More images
Forecourt Walls, Gate Piers and Gates of Nos 39 to 46	The Close, Salisbury	Gate		12 October 1972	SU1426829724; 51°04′00″N 1°47′52″W	1253963	Forecourt Walls, Gate Piers and Gates of Nos 39 to 46 More images
Hemingsby House	The Close, Salisbury	Clergy House	Early 14th century	28 February 1952	SU1416629737; 51°04′00″N 1°47′57″W	1355811	Hemingsby House More images
John Halle's Hall (Entrance to the Odeon Cinema)	The New Canal, Salisbury	House	1881	28 February 1952	SU1447229911; 51°04′06″N 1°47′41″W	1258229	John Halle's Hall (Entrance to the Odeon Cinema) More images
Joiners' Hall	St Ann's Street, Salisbury	Timber Framed House	Early 17th century	28 February 1952	SU1480629667; 51°03′58″N 1°47′24″W	1258872	Joiners' Hall More images
King's Arms	St John's Street, Salisbury	Inn	C15/C16	28 February 1952	SU1457829661; 51°03′58″N 1°47′36″W	1273159	King's Arms More images
Leaden Hall	The Close, Salisbury	Clergy House	1717	28 February 1952	SU1411229321; 51°03′47″N 1°48′00″W	1355816	Leaden Hall More images
Malmesbury House	The Close, Salisbury	House	1416	28 February 1952	SU1454529642; 51°03′57″N 1°47′38″W	1252102	Malmesbury House More images
Milford Mill Bridge	Milford Mill Road and Laverstock	Bridge	Late C15/early 16th century	28 February 1952	SU1575929764; 51°04′01″N 1°46′35″W	1242884	Milford Mill Bridge More images
Mill House and Old Mill	West Harnham, Salisbury	Mill House	Early 19th century	28 February 1952	SU1353429413; 51°03′50″N 1°48′30″W	1272956	Mill House and Old Mill More images
Mompesson House	The Close, Salisbury	House	1704	28 February 1952	SU1422829731; 51°04′00″N 1°47′54″W	1355808	Mompesson House More images
North Gate	High Street, Salisbury	Gate	Modern	28 February 1952	SU1427329754; 51°04′01″N 1°47′52″W	1023612	North Gate More images
Remains of Old Sarum Castle and Cathedral	Castle Road, Salisbury	Castle	Norman	12 October 1972	SU1376532703; 51°05′37″N 1°48′17″W	1248682	Remains of Old Sarum Castle and Cathedral More images
Retaining Wall, Screen Railings, Piers and Gates to Front Garden of No 68, The Close	The Close, Salisbury	Gate	c. 1720	12 October 1972	SU1414229407; 51°03′50″N 1°47′58″W	1023629	Retaining Wall, Screen Railings, Piers and Gates to Front Garden of No 68, The Close More images
School of Arts Annexe	Crane Street, Salisbury	House	18th century	28 February 1952	SU1451729781; 51°04′02″N 1°47′39″W	1366014	School of Arts Annexe More images
Screen Wall, Rails, Piers, Gates and Overthrow in front of Mompesson House	The Close, Salisbury	Gate		12 October 1972	SU1422329721; 51°04′00″N 1°47′54″W	1253989	Screen Wall, Rails, Piers, Gates and Overthrow in front of Mompesson House More images
South or Harnham Gate and South Gate House	De Vaux Place, Salisbury	Gate	14th century	28 February 1952	SU1427129247; 51°03′45″N 1°47′52″W	1240556	South or Harnham Gate and South Gate House More images
St Anne's Gate	St John's Street, Salisbury	Gate	c. 1331	28 February 1952	SU1455029638; 51°03′57″N 1°47′37″W	1355835	St Anne's Gate More images
The Close Wall	Exeter Street, Salisbury	Wall	1331	28 February 1952	SU1453929534; 51°03′54″N 1°47′38″W	1251543	The Close Wall More images
The Matrons' College	High Street, Salisbury	House	Established 1682	28 February 1952	SU1428029706; 51°03′59″N 1°47′51″W	1355846	The Matrons' College More images
The Old George Inn	High Street, Salisbury	Timber Framed House	14th century and later	28 February 1952	SU1430329852; 51°04′04″N 1°47′50″W	1242383	The Old George Inn More images
The Poultry Cross	Minster Street, Salisbury	Shelter	14th century	28 February 1952	SU1438029956; 51°04′08″N 1°47′46″W	1243148	The Poultry Cross More images
The Walton Canonry	The Close, Salisbury	House	Earlier house	28 February 1952	SU1411829379; 51°03′49″N 1°48′00″W	1261267	The Walton Canonry More images
Theological College (Sarum College)	The Close, Salisbury	Theological College	Late 17th century	28 February 1952	SU1443529670; 51°03′58″N 1°47′43″W	1023595	Theological College (Sarum College) More images
Trinity Almshouses, Trinity Hospital	Trinity Street, Salisbury	Almshouses	Founded 1379	28 February 1952	SU1466529753; 51°04′01″N 1°47′32″W	1243305	Trinity Almshouses, Trinity Hospital More images
Wren Hall	The Close, Salisbury	House	Rebuilt 1714	28 February 1952	SU1415929711; 51°04′00″N 1°47′58″W	1023620	Wren Hall More images

== See also ==
- List of Grade I listed buildings in Wiltshire
