= James Harris (grammarian) =

English politician (1709–1780)

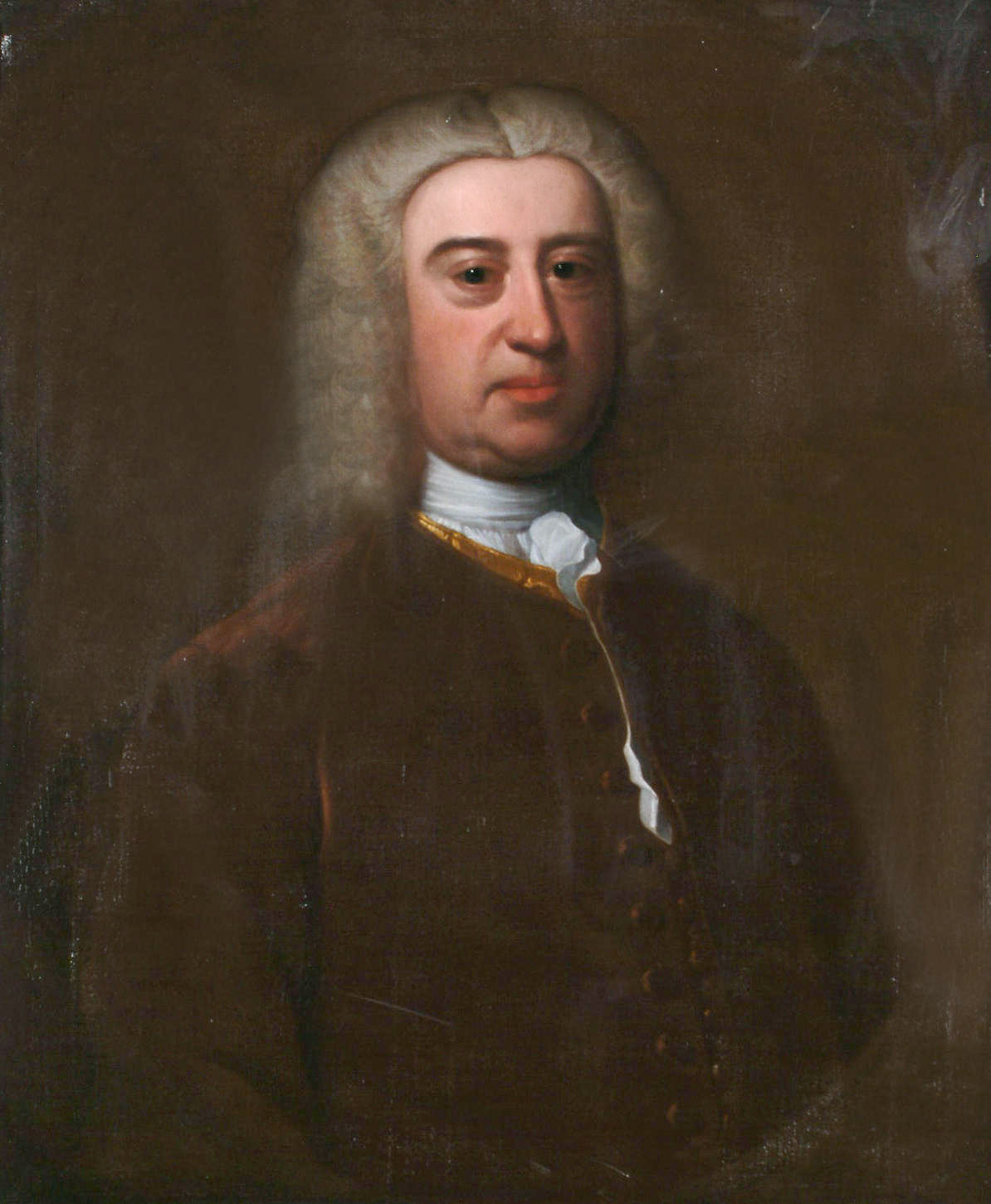
James Harris (Circle of Arthur Pond)

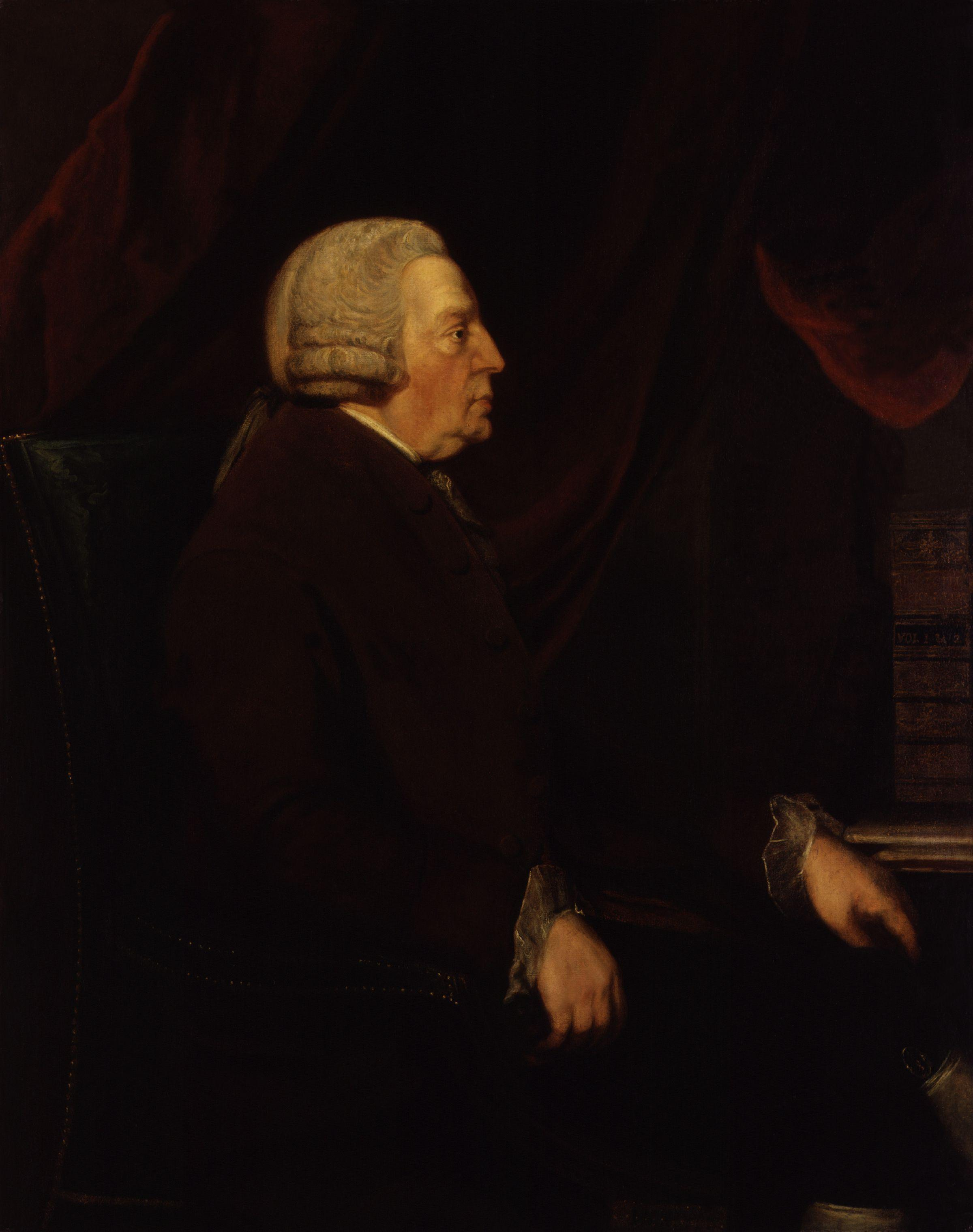
James Harris, portrait attributed to Frances Reynolds, c. 1777

James Harris, FRS (24 July 1709 – 22 December 1780) was an English politician and grammarian. He was the author of Hermes, a philosophical inquiry concerning universal grammar (1751).

== Life ==
James Harris was born at Salisbury, Wiltshire, the son of James Harris (1674–1731) by his second marriage to Elizabeth (c. 1682–1744), daughter of Anthony Ashley Cooper, 2nd Earl of Shaftesbury. He was educated at the Salisbury Cathedral School, and Wadham College, Oxford. On leaving university he was entered at Lincoln's Inn as a student of law, though he was not intended for the Bar. The death of his father in 1733 brought him an independent fortune and Malmesbury House in Salisbury's Cathedral Close.

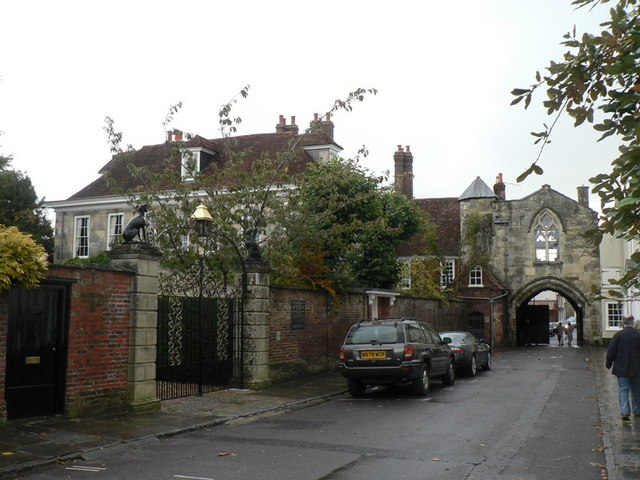
Malmesbury House, home of James Harris in Salisbury's Cathedral Close, today

Harris became a county magistrate. He was Member of Parliament for Christchurch from 1761 until his death, and Comptroller to the Queen from 1774 to 1780. He held political office under George Grenville: in January 1763 he became a lord of the admiralty, and in April that year a lord of the treasury. He retired from his post with Grenville in 1765.

Harris was elected a Fellow of the Royal Society in 1763. He died at Malmesbury House on 22 December 1780, and was buried on 28 December in Salisbury Cathedral, where there is a memorial to him in the north transept.

== Associations ==
Harris was a lover of music and a friend of Handel. He directed concerts and music festivals at Salisbury for nearly fifty years. He adapted the words for a selection from Italian and German composers (subsequently published by the cathedral organist Joseph Corfe). He wrote a number of pastorals. One of them, Damon and Amaryllis was produced by David Garrick at Drury Lane, as debut piece for the singer Thomas Norris. Norris was originally a Salisbury chorister, and a protégé of Harris. In 1741 John Robartes, 4th Earl of Radnor gave him the collection of Handel's music made by Elizabeth Legh (1694–1734).

One correspondent of Harris was Lord Monboddo, who disclosed in a 1772 letter to him some early evolutionary thought. Samuel Johnson found Harris uncongenial, saying he was "a sound, solid scholar," but "a prig" and "a coxcomb" who "did not understand his own system" in Harris's work Hermes.

The music historian Charles Burney, on the other hand, esteemed him as a writer on music. Harris, his wife and daughter attended a high-powered domestic concert at Burney's house in May 1775, of which a vivid description by the 22-year-old Frances (Fanny) Burney survives: "I had the satisfaction to sit next to Mr. Harris, who is very chearful [sic] and communicative, and his conversation instructive and agreeable." His daughter Louisa ("a modest, reserved, and sensible girl") was asked to sing, and Harris accompanied her.

== Works ==
Interested in the Greek and Latin classics, Harris sought out manuscripts and printed editions that influenced his writings, as did the works of the 3rd Earl of Shaftesbury, his uncle. Harris published in 1744 Three Treatises — on art; on music, painting and poetry; and on happiness. In 1751 appeared the work by which he became best known, Hermes, a philosophical inquiry concerning universal grammar. In the direction of prescriptive grammar, it influenced Robert Lowth's English grammar of 1762.

Harris also published Philosophical Arrangements and Philological Inquiries. His works were collected and published in 1801, by his son James who prefixed a brief biography.

Hampshire Record Office holds Harris's papers. Letters from his wife Elizabeth are also extant.

== Family ==
Harris married Elizabeth, daughter of John Clarke of Sandford, Somerset, in 1745. They had two sons and three daughters. James Harris, 1st Earl of Malmesbury, the diplomat, was his elder son.

Parliament of Great Britain
Preceded by Sir Thomas Robinson; John Mordaunt	Member of Parliament for Christchurch; 1761 – 1781; With: Hon. Thomas Robinson 1761–1770; James Harris (junior) 1770–1774; Thomas Villiers Hyde 1774–1780; Sir James Harris from 1780	Succeeded by Sir John Frederick, Bt; Sir James Harris
