= Philip Shelbourne =

Sir Philip Shelbourne (15 June 1924 – 15 April 1993) was a British lawyer and financier.

Shelbourne was educated at Radley College. He left Radley in 1942 with a scholarship to Christ Church, Oxford, but served in the Royal Armoured Corps 1943–46 before going up to Christ Church. After graduating in jurisprudence he was a Commonwealth Fund Fellow at Harvard Law School 1949–50.

As a barrister, Shelbourne specialised in tax law. He gave up the Bar in 1962 to join NM Rothschild and Sons. After leaving Rothschild in 1970 he was chairman and/or chief executive of companies including Samuel Montagu & Co. and subsequently British National Oil Corporation and its successor Britoil. His final positions were deputy chairman of the Takeover Panel and concurrently chairman of Henry Ansbacher Holdings.

Shelbourne was knighted in the 1984 New Year Honours. He lived at Myles Place in the cathedral close in Salisbury, Wiltshire.
