= Harnham Gate =

Historic gateway in Salisbury, England

Coordinates: 51°03′45″N 1°47′52″W

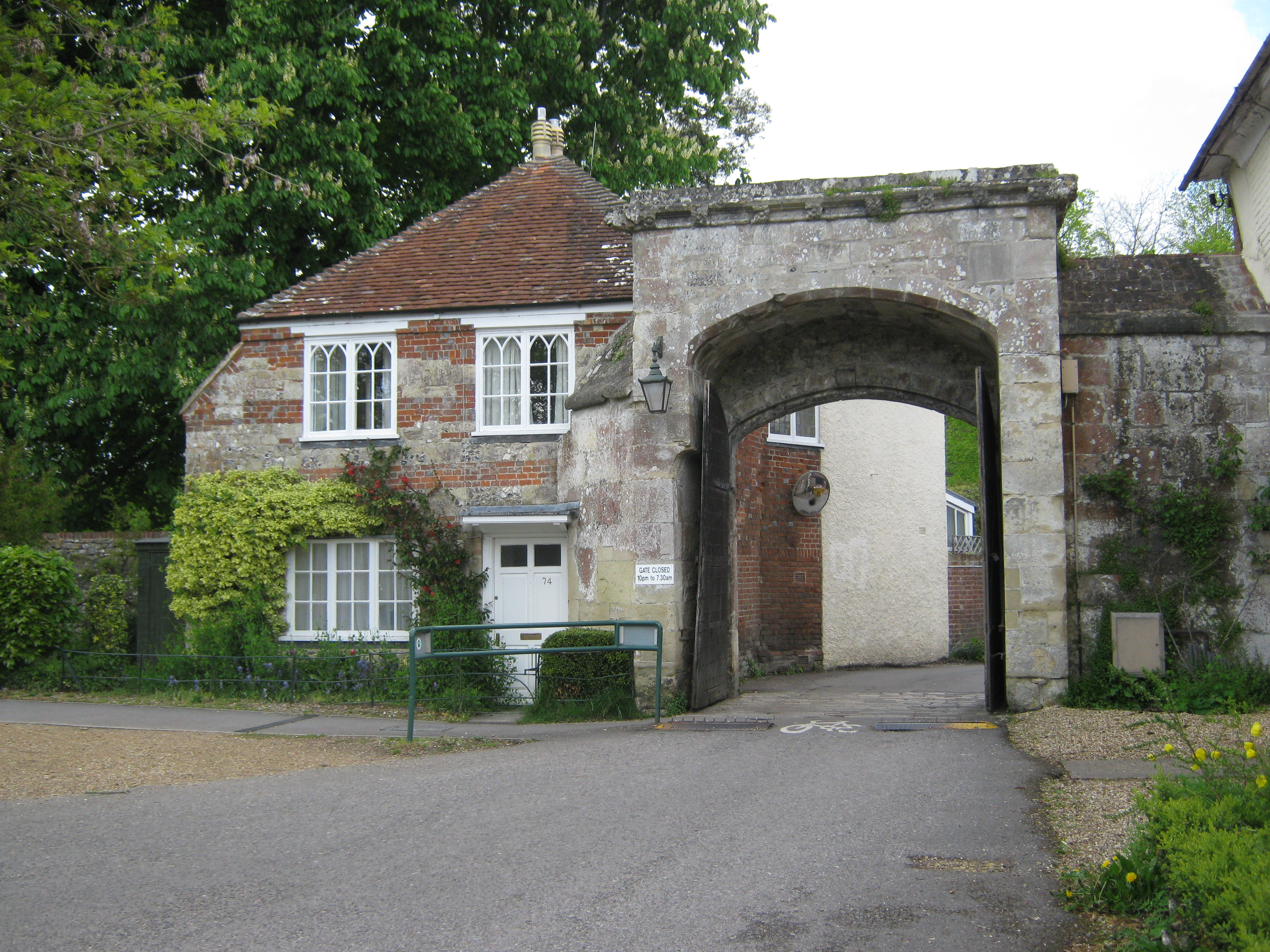
Harnham Gate, looking eastwards

Harnham Gate is a historic gateway in the city of Salisbury in Wiltshire, England. Standing at the southern end of the cathedral close of Salisbury Cathedral, it is also known as the South Gate. It dates back to the fourteenth century and leads to a road connecting the suburb of Harnham on the southern side of the city, across the River Avon. The adjoining gatehouse was rebuilt in the late eighteenth or early nineteenth century. The gateway and gatehouse are now Grade I listed by Historic England.

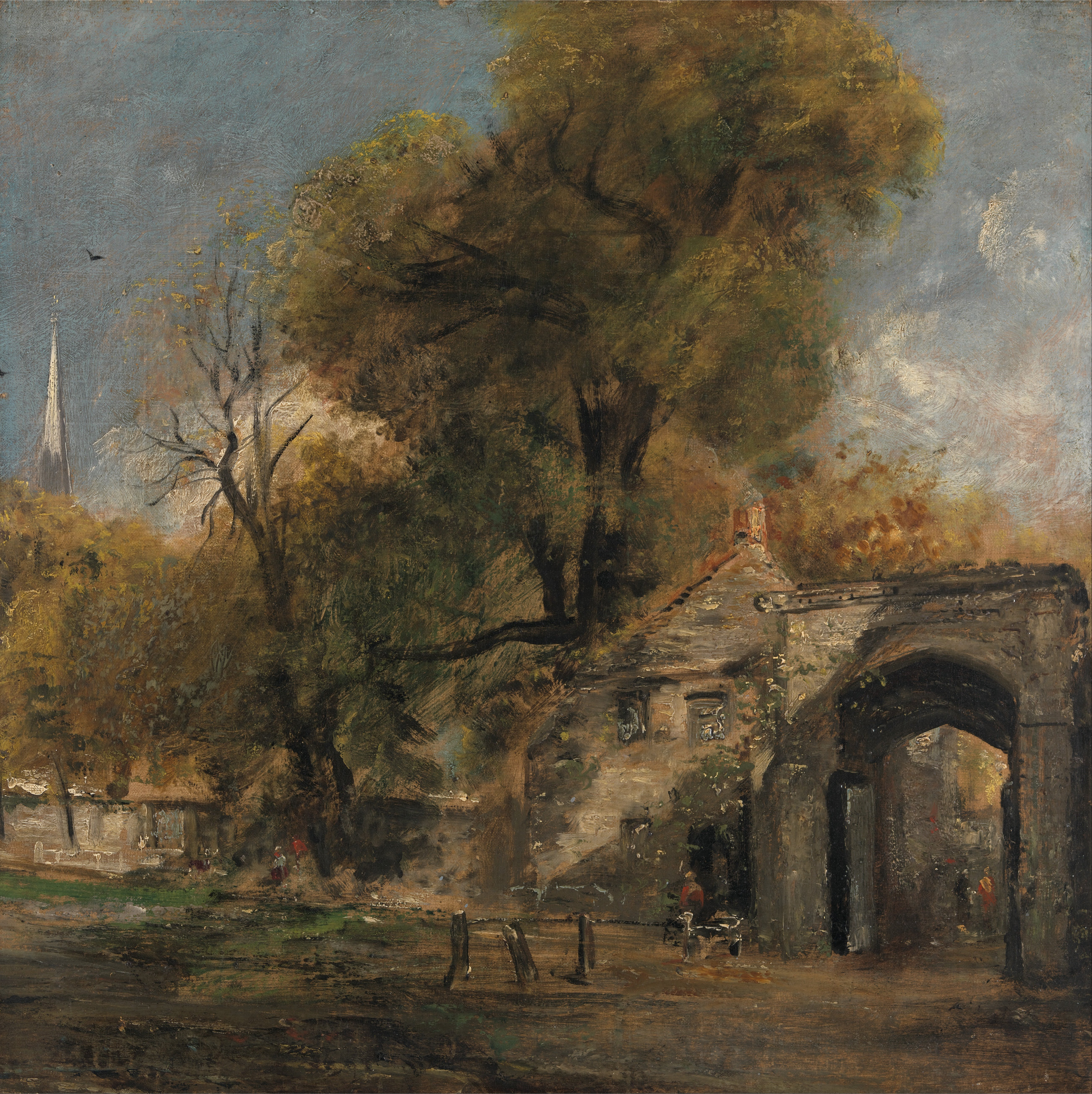
Harnham Gate, Salisbury by John Constable, 1821

In 1821, landscape artist John Constable painted a view of Harnham Gate while staying in the city. It was one of a number of depictions of Salisbury and its cathedral he painted over several decades.

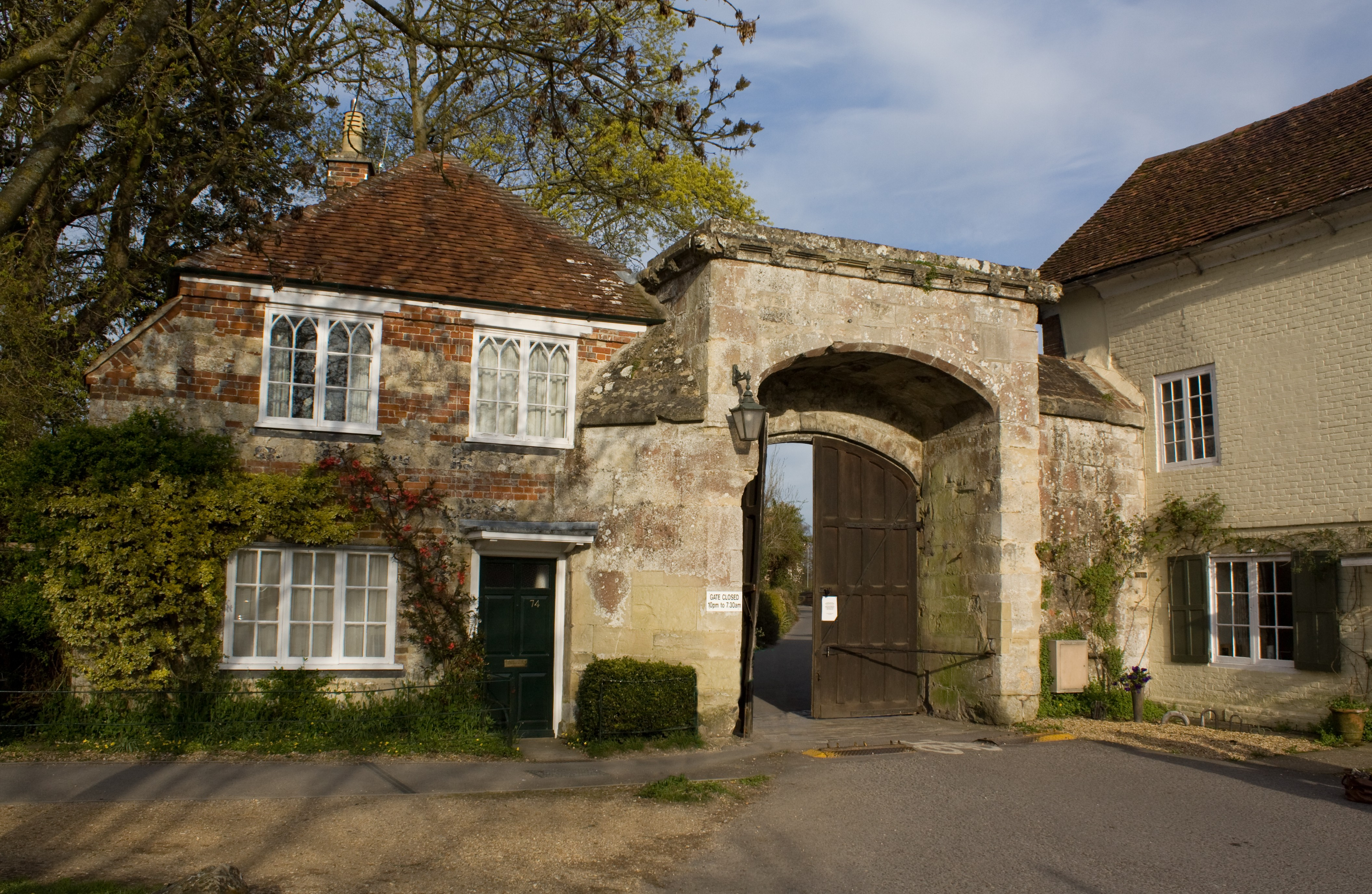
Harnham Gate, looking westwards

== See also ==
- List of Grade I listed buildings in Salisbury

== Bibliography ==
- Pevsner, Nikolaus & Cherry, Bridget. Wiltshire. Yale University Press, 2002.
- Reynolds, Graham. Constable's England. Metropolitan Museum of Art, 1983.
