= College of Matrons =

Building in Salisbury, Wiltshire, England

Coordinates: 51.066659°N 1.797729°W

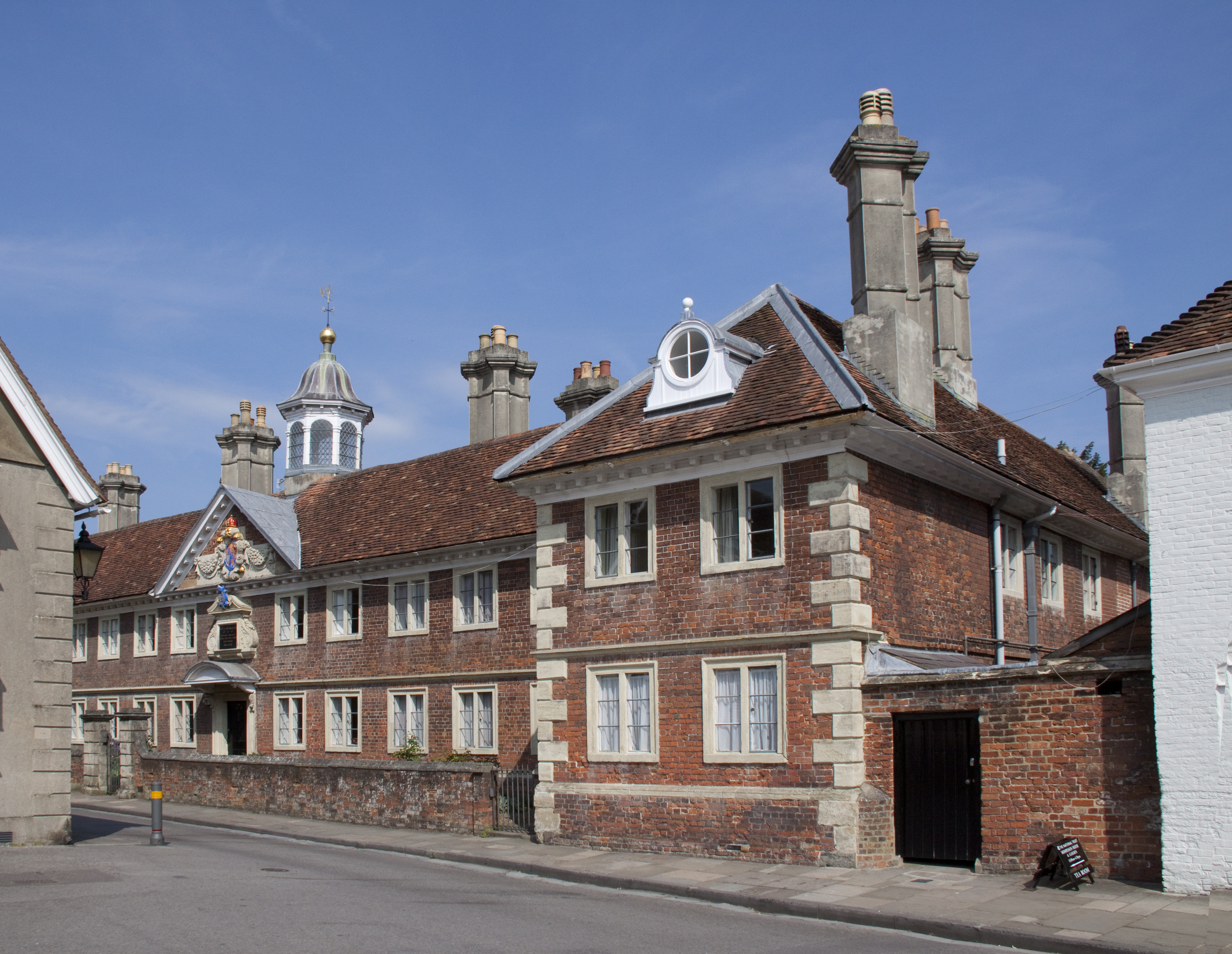
The College of Matrons viewed from the south-west

The College of Matrons (or Matrons' College) is a residential building and charity within the Salisbury Cathedral Close, Wiltshire, England. It was constructed in 1682 by Seth Ward, bishop of Salisbury, as an almshouse for ten widows of clergy ordained within the diocese of Salisbury. It is on the extension of Salisbury High Street that enters the cathedral close through the North Gate. The building was listed at Grade I in 1952.

== History ==
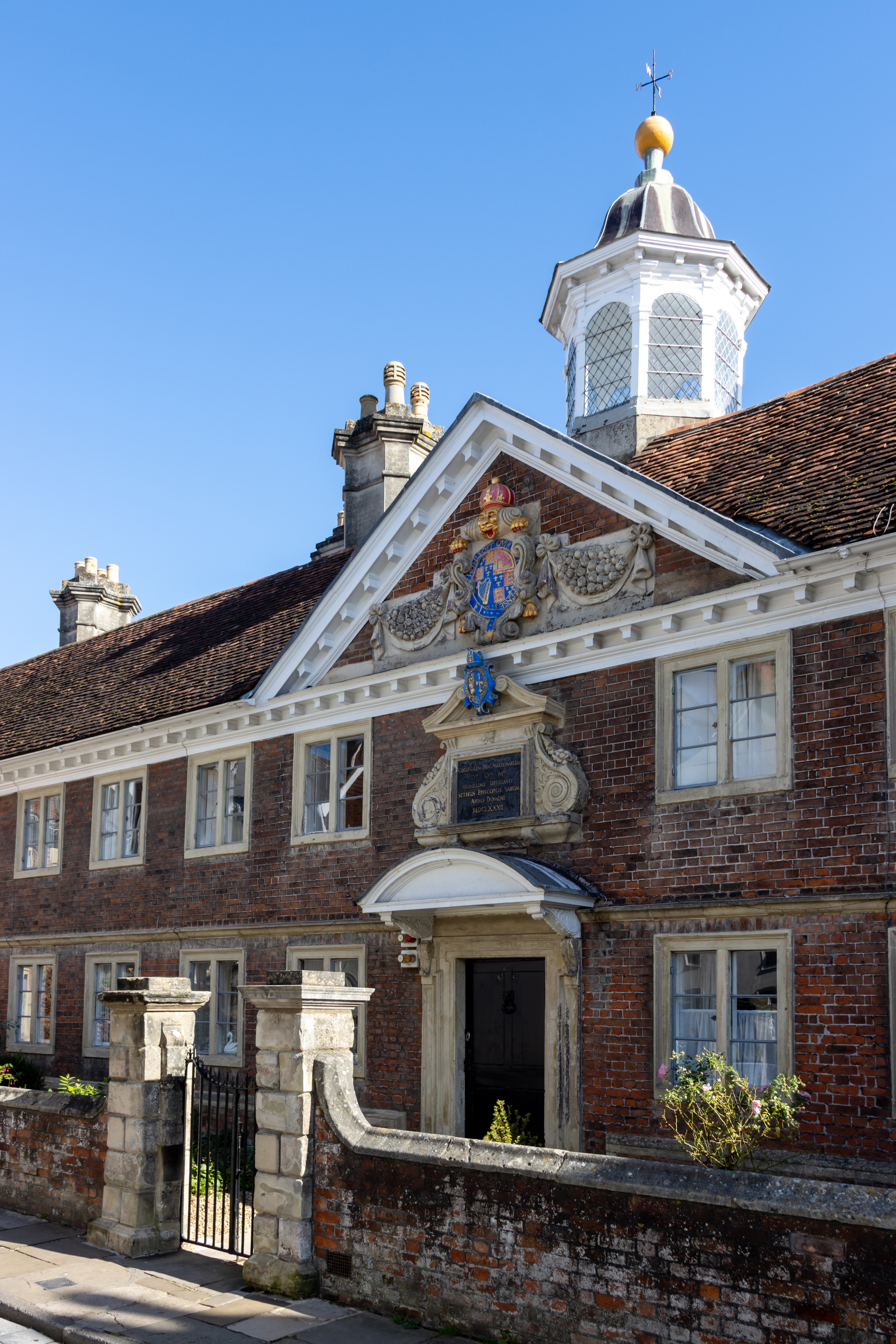
The College in 2023

Bishop Ward gave properties, including Whaddon Farm in the parishes of Alderbury and West Grimstead, to generate rent to fund the almshouse and to provide the widows with a small income. In the early years the widows received a weekly pension of six shillings. To be eligible to live in the college, widows had to be at least 50 years of age and have an annual income of less than £10 a year. Should there be insufficient candidates within the Salisbury diocese, applicants from the Diocese of Exeter would be considered.

Among the early rules of governance, tenants were required to attend two divine services each day in the cathedral and could not be absent from the cathedral close for more than a month in each year. When the charity was first established, the selection of the tenant widows was the responsibility of Bishop Ward; after his death the task fell alternately to the bishop and the dean and chapter. Over the intervening centuries the charity has benefited from the wills of various individuals, for example, William Benson Earle who left 2000 guineas in 1796, Thomas Henry Allen Poynder from Hartham Park in Corsham who gave 1,000 guineas in 1865, Helen Nevill, who bequeathed £1,000 in 1929, and Mary Fletcher who bequeathed £1,500 in 1953. The College of Matrons also derived income from various property rents in Middlesex, London, Sussex, Cambridgeshire and Berkshire; in 1883 these rents totalled about £28 per year. However, by the end of the 19th century many of these farm rents had been redeemed and by 1958 the charity was only receiving £13 per year from farm rents.

== Conditions of residence ==
Since the inauguration of the charity, the monetary limits have increased to reflect financial inflation. From the original six shillings a week paid to the first occupants, the yearly pension had risen to £40 (15 shillings a week) in 1833, and the qualifying limit of annual income for residency had risen to £20. At this time the number of applicants for residence in the almshouse was "not numerous". There was a change in administration of the college in 1869 whereby the number of matrons was reduced to eight, but could be increased to ten at the discretion of the governors. At this time the annual allowance was increased to no more than £60 per year, with a qualifying income of £50, and eligibility was extended to unmarried daughters of clergy ordained in the Salisbury or Exeter dioceses. There were eight matrons resident in 1907, the majority having their own income and some employing servants. In the 1930s and 1940s a scheme to raise the personal income limit was suggested but was declined by the Charity Commissioners as there were sufficient candidates within the £50 limit. In 1955 the personal limit to qualify as a resident was raised to £200.

As of 2013, the one-bedroom accommodation is available to any single, independent lady of at least 55 years of age living in the Salisbury area, with preference given to widows and unmarried daughters of clergy.

== The building ==
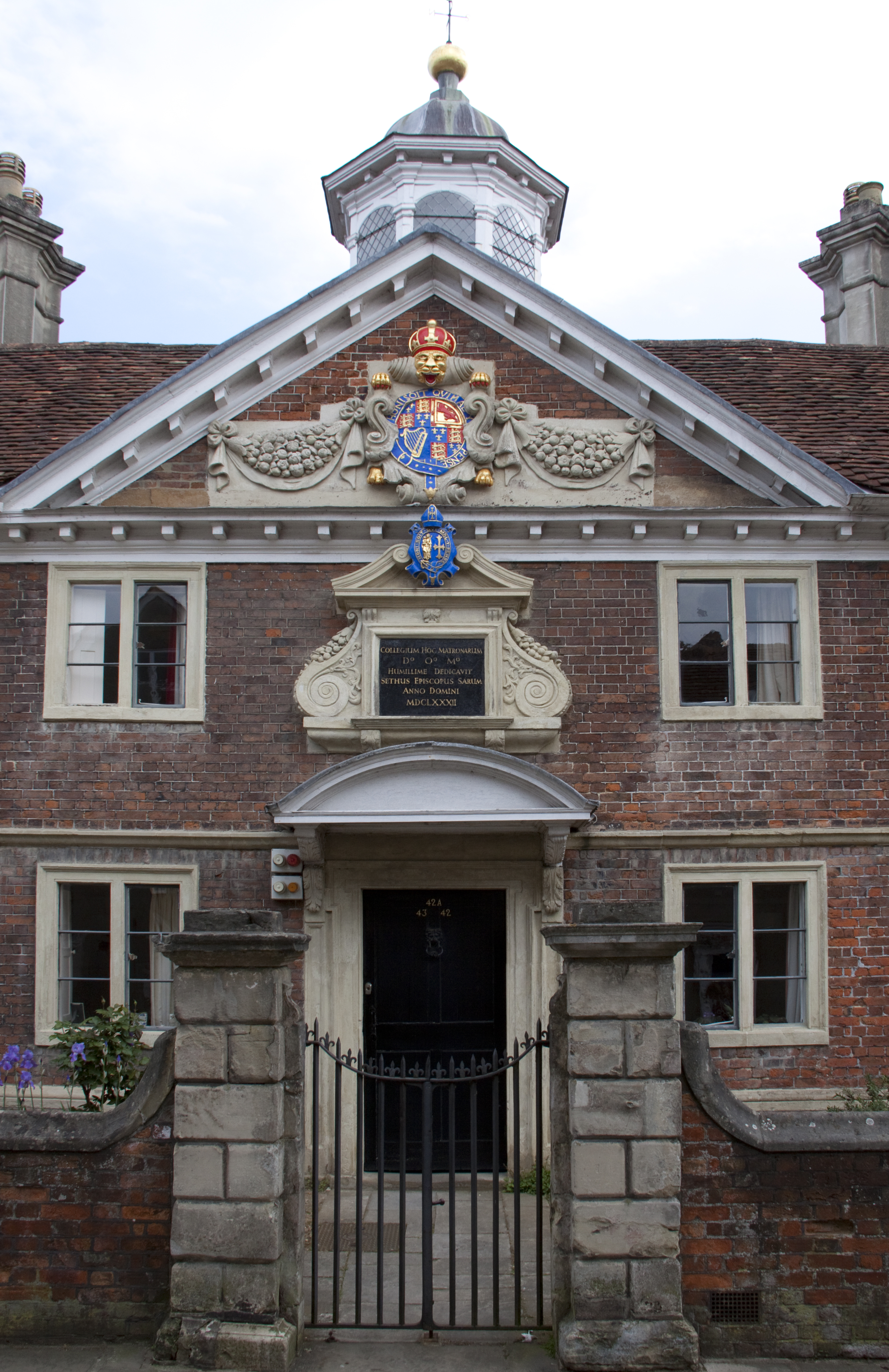
Details of entrance and top of roof lantern

There is some uncertainty as to whether Christopher Wren designed the building. It is brick-built with stone window surrounds, stone quoins and red tiles. It has a central front with extended wings. A leaded-glass, lead domed roof lantern surmounted by a golden ball is positioned on the rear of the roof at the centre of the frontage. There are six diagonally-set stone chimney stacks. Above the porched main entrance, set in a roof-level gable end, is a brightly painted Royal Coat of Arms from the Stuart period, with drapes of fruit on each side. There is a garden area to the rear and some other smaller associated redbrick buildings. The building is fronted by a long narrow garden contained within an original brick, stone-topped wall with three iron gates, the central one flanked by stone pillars. The wall and gates are Grade I listed separately from the house. The building was extended and renovated in 1870.
