= Salisbury Cathedral Choir =

Choir in Wiltshire, England

The Choir of Salisbury Cathedral exists to sing services in Salisbury Cathedral, Wiltshire, England, and has probably been in existence since the consecration of the cathedral in 1258. The choir comprises twenty boy choristers and twenty girl choristers aged from 8 to 13 years, and six professional lay vicars singing countertenor, tenor and bass.

Salisbury was the first English cathedral to recruit a girl choristers' choir, in 1991. The girls' choir is usually wholly independent of the boys' when in the cathedral. Singing duties are equally divided between the boy and girl choristers.

In addition to services, the choir is involved in concerts and CD recordings. It participates in the annual Southern Cathedrals Festival (despite initial resistance to the girls' choir). The choir also broadcasts frequently on BBC Radio 3 and BBC Radio 4. A documentary television programme about the choir was shown on BBC Four in March 2012 under the title Angelic Voices; it included episodes in the life of the members of both choirs over a four-month period.

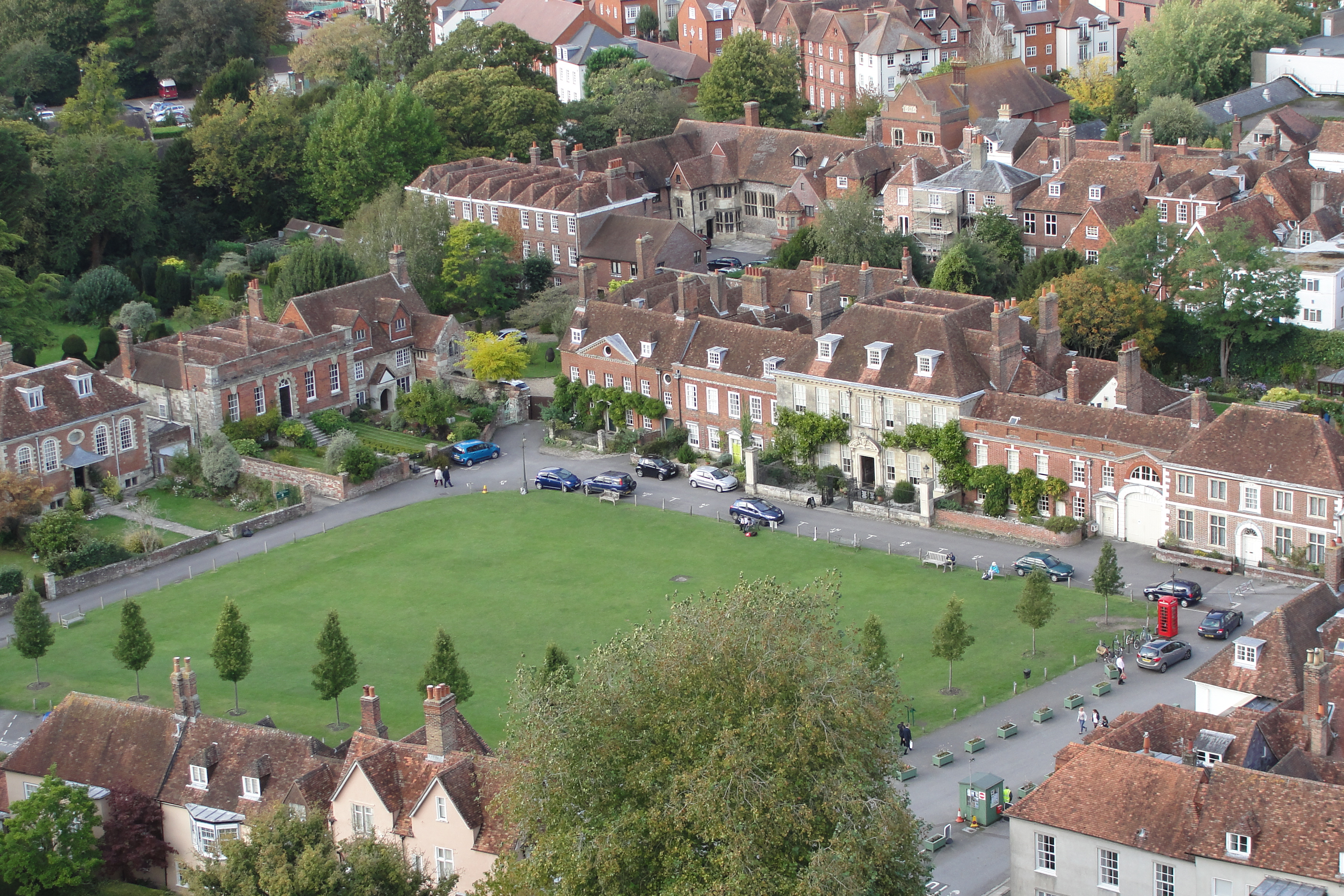
An area near the cathedral is known as Choristers Square.

The choristers are educated at Salisbury Cathedral School, which is in the Cathedral Close. The choir is directed by the Director of Music, currently David Halls, and accompanied by the Assistant Organist, plus an organ scholar, who is selected by audition on an annual basis.

== Tours ==
In previous years the boys and men have travelled to Latvia, Estonia and France; the girls have visited Italy and Austria. In 2009 the boys and men of Salisbury Cathedral Choir made their first visit to Salisbury's twinned city of Saintes, France, a visit they repeated together with the girls' choir in 2014. Another tour to Salisbury's other twin town of Xanten, Germany, took place just after Easter 2016. The combined choirs visited the Channel Islands following their 2022 transfer to the Diocese of Salisbury, and also the Netherlands.

== Recordings ==
Recent recordings include:

- 2023 - Salisbury Christmas
- 2019 – Poetry in Music: Musical Settings of Words by George Herbert
- 2017 – Music for Sunday
- 2016 – Complete Psalms of David Volume 9 Series 2
- 2013 – Great Hymns from Salisbury
- 2009 – Christmas at Salisbury Cathedral
- 2009 – Bernard Naylor – The Nine Motets
- 2009 – Anthems from Salisbury
- 2008 – Christmas Carols from Wells and Salisbury
- 2008 – The Resurrection
- 2006 – The Virgin Mary's Journey
- 2004 – Praise and Thanksgiving: Anthems from Salisbury
- 2003 – King of Glory: Evensong from Salisbury
- 2001 – Angels' Song: The New Music of Salisbury Cathedral
- 2001 – From Darkness to Light
- 1997 – Britten: Spring Symphony
- 1997 – Sing Choirs of Angels
- 1996 – An English Chorister's Songbook

== Notable former choristers ==
- Edward Lowe (composer) (c.1602 – 1682)
- Sir Stephen Fox (1627–1716)
- Bernard Rose (musician) (1916–1996)
- Nicholas Daniel (born 1962), oboist

== See also ==
- Anglican church music
