= Thomas Norris (composer) =

English musician

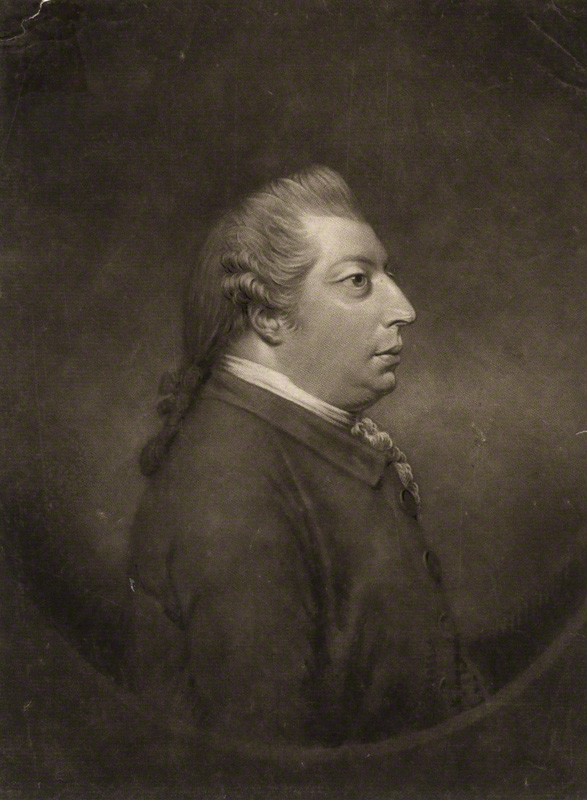
Thomas Norris, 1777 engraving

Thomas Norris (baptised 15 August 1741 – 5 September 1790) was an English musician, known as a singer and composer.

== Life ==
The son of John Norris of Mere, Wiltshire, he was baptised there on 15 August 1741. He became a chorister in Salisbury Cathedral under John Stephens. James Harris wrote a pastoral operetta to introduce Norris to the public. He then sang as a soprano at the Worcester and Hereford festivals of 1761–62, and at Drury Lane Theatre in a pasticcio, The Spring. In 1765 he was appointed organist of Christ Church and of St John's College, Oxford, and in the same year graduated Mus. Bac.; in 1771 he was admitted a lay clerk of Magdalen College. He appeared as a tenor at the Gloucester festival in 1766, and sang at the Three Choirs festivals until 1788. He was one of the principal singers at the first Handel commemoration festival in 1784, and his success there led to engagements for oratorio parts in London.

Norris was a drinker. His last appearance was at the Birmingham festival of 1790; he died at Himley Hall, near Stourbridge, on 5 September that year.

== Works ==
Norris composed mostly church music, including several anthems, one of which was printed, as well as catches, canons and glees, some of which are included in Thomas Warren's Collections. His instrumental works included six symphonies for strings, oboes, and horns, published around 1772, and an overture for The Tempest, written in 1774. Jürgen Schaarwächter says that "his compositions are neither melodically nor harmonically especially interesting; consequently they - and he - have been nearly entirely forgotten".

== Notes ==
Attribution

This article incorporates text from a publication now in the public domain: Lee, Sidney, ed. (1895). "Norris, Thomas (1741-1790)". Dictionary of National Biography. Vol. 41. London: Smith, Elder & Co.
