= Harnham Gate, Salisbury =

Painting by John Constable

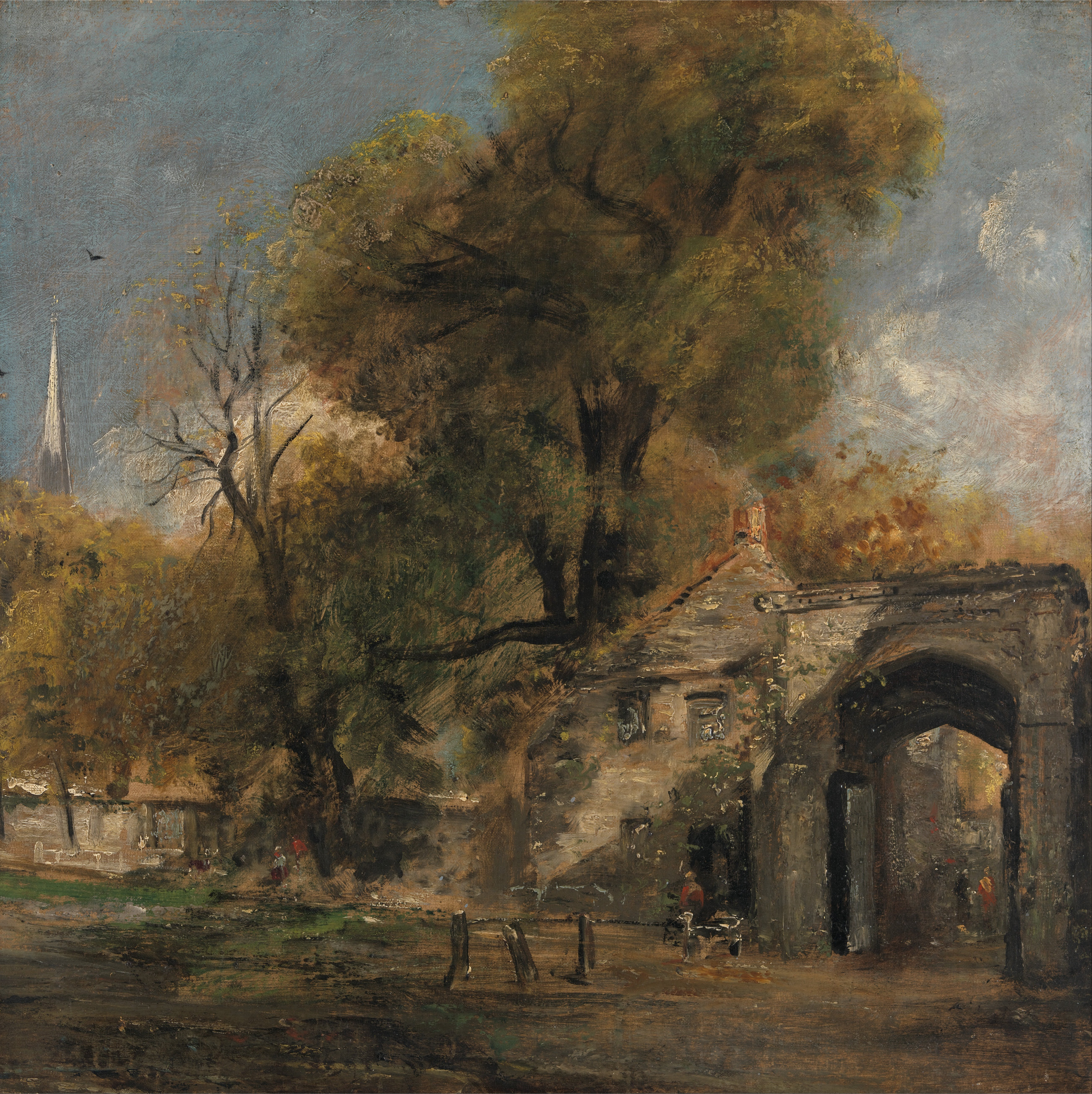
- Artist: John Constable
- Year: 1821
- Type: Oil on canvas, landscape painting
- Dimensions: 51 cm × 51 cm (20 in × 20 in)
- Location: Yale Center for British Art, New Haven, Connecticut

Harnham Gate, Salisbury is an 1821 landscape painting by the British artist John Constable. It depicts a view of the medieval Harnham Gate, at the southern end of the cathedral close in the Southern English cathedral city of Salisbury; the gate connects the city with the southern suburb of Harnham. The gateway is seen from the western side looking eastwards, with the spire of Salisbury Cathedral visible in the distance. Constable was a frequent visitor to Salisbury, where his patron John Fisher was bishop, and he painted numerous views of the cathedral. He stayed in the city in 1820 and again in 1821.

Today, the painting is in the Yale Center for British Art in Connecticut, having been acquired in 1999 through Paul Mellon.

== See also ==
- List of paintings by John Constable

== Bibliography ==
- Bailey, Anthony. John Constable: A Kingdom of his Own. Random House, 2012.
- Charles, Victoria. Constable. Parkstone International, 2015.
- Hamilton, James. Constable: A Portrait. Hachette UK, 2022.
- Reynolds, Graham. Constable's England. Metropolitan Museum of Art, 1983.
