= William Benson Earle =

English philanthropist

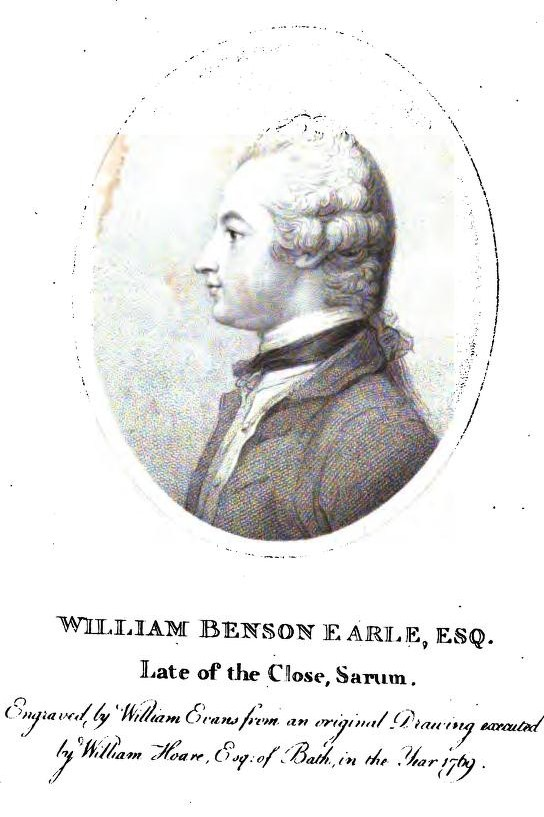
William Benson Earle, after William Hoare.

William Benson Earle (1740–1796) was an English philanthropist.

== Life ==
Earle was the eldest son of Harry Benson Earle. He was born at Shaftesbury, Wiltshire, in 1740, but his life was passed at Salisbury, with the history and charities of which city his name is inseparably associated. After spending his boyhood, first at Salisbury Cathedral School in the Close, and then as a commoner at Winchester College, he went on to Merton College, Oxford, where he graduated B.A. in 1761, M.A. in 1764. He then made the grand tour of the continent (1765–1767). In 1773 he was elected a fellow of the Royal Society.

On the death of his father in 1776 Earle succeeded to an ample fortune. He died at Salisbury on 2 March 1796, and was buried at Newton Tony. A monument to his memory, sculpted by John Flaxman, was erected in Salisbury Cathedral.

By his will he bequeathed large sums to various learned and charitable institutions. A profile of him was engraved by Prince Hoare in 1769 at the expense of the Society of Arts.

== Works ==
On his return from his continental tour, Earle prepared several tracts in which he described his travels. Two of these, A Description of Vallombrosa and A Picturesque View of the Glaciers in Savoy, he communicated to the Monthly Miscellany. A third is A Letter to Lord Littelton, containing a description of the last great Eruption of Mount Ætna, A.D. 1766, Lond. 1775, a sequel to the reprint of a letter on the 1669 Etna eruption addressed to Charles II by Lord Winchilsea.

In 1786, having discovered who was the real author, he published a new edition of Bishop John Earle's Characters, which on its first appearance only bore the name of the publisher and editor, Edward Blount. He was also a musician, and composed glees; also a Sanctus and a Kyrie which were occasionally performed in Salisbury Cathedral.
