= Poultry Cross (Salisbury) =

Grade I listed market cross in Salisbury, United Kingdom

Coordinates: 51°04′08″N 1°47′46″W

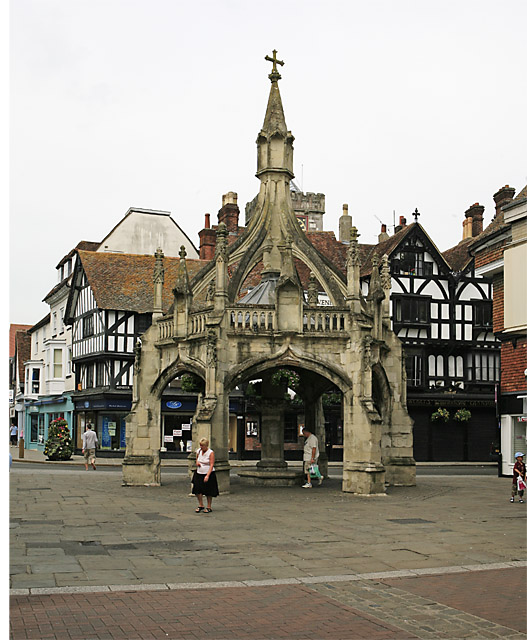
The Poultry Cross viewed from the south-east

The Poultry Cross is a market cross in Salisbury, Wiltshire, England, marking the site of former markets. Constructed in the 14th century and modified in the 18th century, it stands at the junction of Silver Street and Minster Street. It has been designated by English Heritage as a Grade I listed structure.

The Poultry Cross is the only one remaining of four market crosses that once stood in Salisbury. The others were the Cheese Cross in the present Cheesemarket area, Barnard's Cross (livestock) at the junction of Barnard Street and Culver Street and another which designated a market for wool and yarn at the east end of the present Market Place, near the War Memorial.

The presence of a market cross on the site dates to 1307, and the name to about a century later. The present stone structure was built in the 14th century. The original flying buttresses were removed in 1711, as can be seen in the painting of 1800 by J. M. W. Turner; the present buttresses date from 1852 to 1854, when the upper parts of the cross were rebuilt to the designs of the architect Owen Browne Carter.

The present-day site, around the structure, is used as part of Salisbury Market on Tuesdays and Saturdays. However, the structure itself is no longer in use.
