= Wren Hall =

Grade I listed building in Salisbury, UK

Coordinates: 51.0666°N 1.7993°W

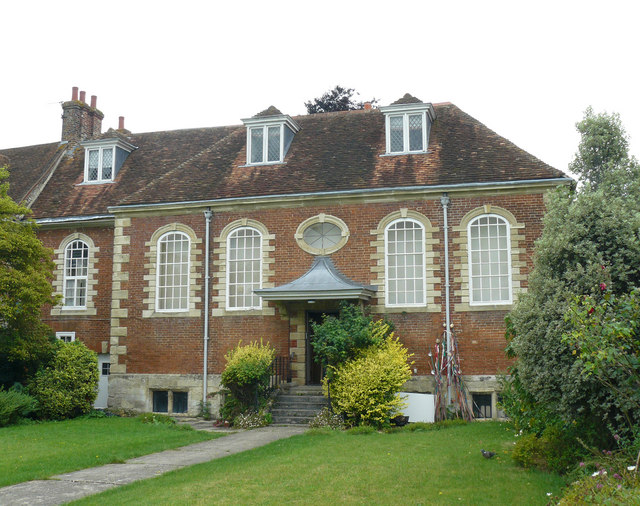
Wren Hall, with the roof of Braybrooke House just visible on left

Wren Hall is a Grade I listed building in Salisbury Cathedral Close, Wiltshire, England.

Situated on the west side of Choristers' Green, it was originally part of the attached Braybrook House. A rebuilding was commissioned and funded by Sir Stephen Fox, an alumnus of the Cathedral School, and carried out in 1714 by Thomas Naish, Clerk of Works to the cathedral, to provide a classroom and further dormitories for the cathedral choristers. It has little proven connection with Christopher Wren except that in its style it provides a suitable memorial to the Wiltshire-born architect.

After the removal of the Choir School the College of Sarum St Michael acquired it for a short period until it became the diocesan archive repository. In the 1980s it was used as the Salisbury Cathedral Spire Appeal office and later became a cathedral educational resource centre for school visits. The desks of the headmaster and assistant master remain at opposite ends of the room as a reminder of the original use as a single large classroom, or "Big School Room" as it was called, with the two classes sitting back-to-back. The attic contains some dormitories and there are original medieval cellars below the building.

The building was designated as Grade I listed in 1952.
