= The King's House, Salisbury =

Building in Salisbury, Wiltshire, England

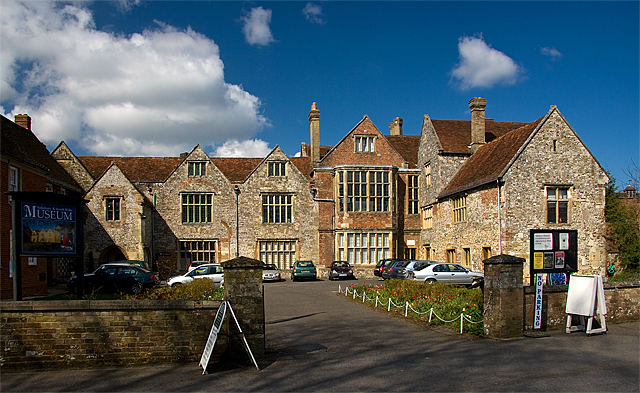
- The King's House, West Walk, Salisbury Cathedral Close

- Location within Wiltshire
- 51°03′52″N 1°48′00″W
- Location: 65, The Close, Salisbury
- OS grid reference: SU1410529487

Site notes
- Area: Wiltshire
- Governing body: Salisbury Museum
- Owner: Dean and Chapter of Salisbury Cathedral

Listed Building – Grade I
- Official name: The King's House and college of Sarum St Michael
- Designated: 28 February 1952
- Reference no.: 1355814

The King’s House is a Grade I listed building in Salisbury Cathedral Close, Wiltshire, England. Since 1981 it has accommodated the Salisbury Museum and associated galleries.

== History ==
=== 13th–14th century ===
The house was referred to as the Court of the Abbott of Sherborne in 13th-century documents. The Abbot of Sherborne Abbey used this house as his prebendal residence in Salisbury prior to 1539, when Sherborne Abbey was decommissioned during the Dissolution of the Monasteries. At that time the house was known as Sherborne Palace. The administration of estates of religious houses seized in the Reformation was carried out by the Augmentation Court. Both this office and the Dean and Chapter of Salisbury Cathedral laid claim to the property; after much court wrangling the Dean and Chapter succeeded and still hold the freehold today.

=== 15th–16th century ===
The original house was considerably restructured in the 15th century and replaced with part of the present building. The 15th-century construction can be seen as the central frontage with three gables, and a porch which is thought to date to the 13th century. The building at that time would have had a great hall open to the roof, a parlour with a chamber above, service rooms and a kitchen. The original facing was decorated with flint rubble and herringbone tile courses. The original windows were of Ham Hill stone and traces of these are visible on the frontage. The porch vaulting is also of Ham Hill stone, which is rare in buildings in Salisbury but common in Sherborne which implies that the work was carried out in the Sherborne Abbey's tenancy. The oak entrance door inside the porch, with small wicket leaf and strap hinges, is thought to be original. Later extensions have been added to the north and south. There are smoke louvre trusses in the roof and original fireplaces in several rooms.

In the 16th century, the Dean and Chapter of Salisbury Cathedral let the house to a number of secular tenants. Around that period the north end of the house was extended with a large brick cross-wing, out of proportion to the original house. This extension has two large mullioned and transomed windows and a staircase from the ground floor to the attic, with oak balustrades around two newel posts. Two of the rooms have elaborately decorated plaster ceilings. This work was carried out under the direction of the tenants Thomas and Eleanor Sadler; Thomas was Registrar to the Bishops of Sarum. It is quite probable that it was in these rooms that King James 1 and his wife, Anne of Denmark, were entertained when they visited in 1610 and 1613.

=== 17th century ===
Thomas Sadler (Jr.) and his wife entertained the antiquary John Aubrey at the house in 1656.

=== 18th century ===
In the 18th century the tenancy was held by the Beach family who sublet the property in smaller units. One of the tenants during this time was Lieutenant General Henry Shrapnel, inventor of the fragmenting artillery shell. Shrapnel is recorded as living at the house in 1785 which coincides closely with the time that he developed the shell. Further evidence of his activities comes from a description given in 1836 by a lady who attended the Godolphin School there. In another part of the building was a ladies' school run by a Mrs Smith from 1767 until she retired in 1781. Another school, under the direction of a Mrs Vazey, also used the building at that time.

=== 19th century ===
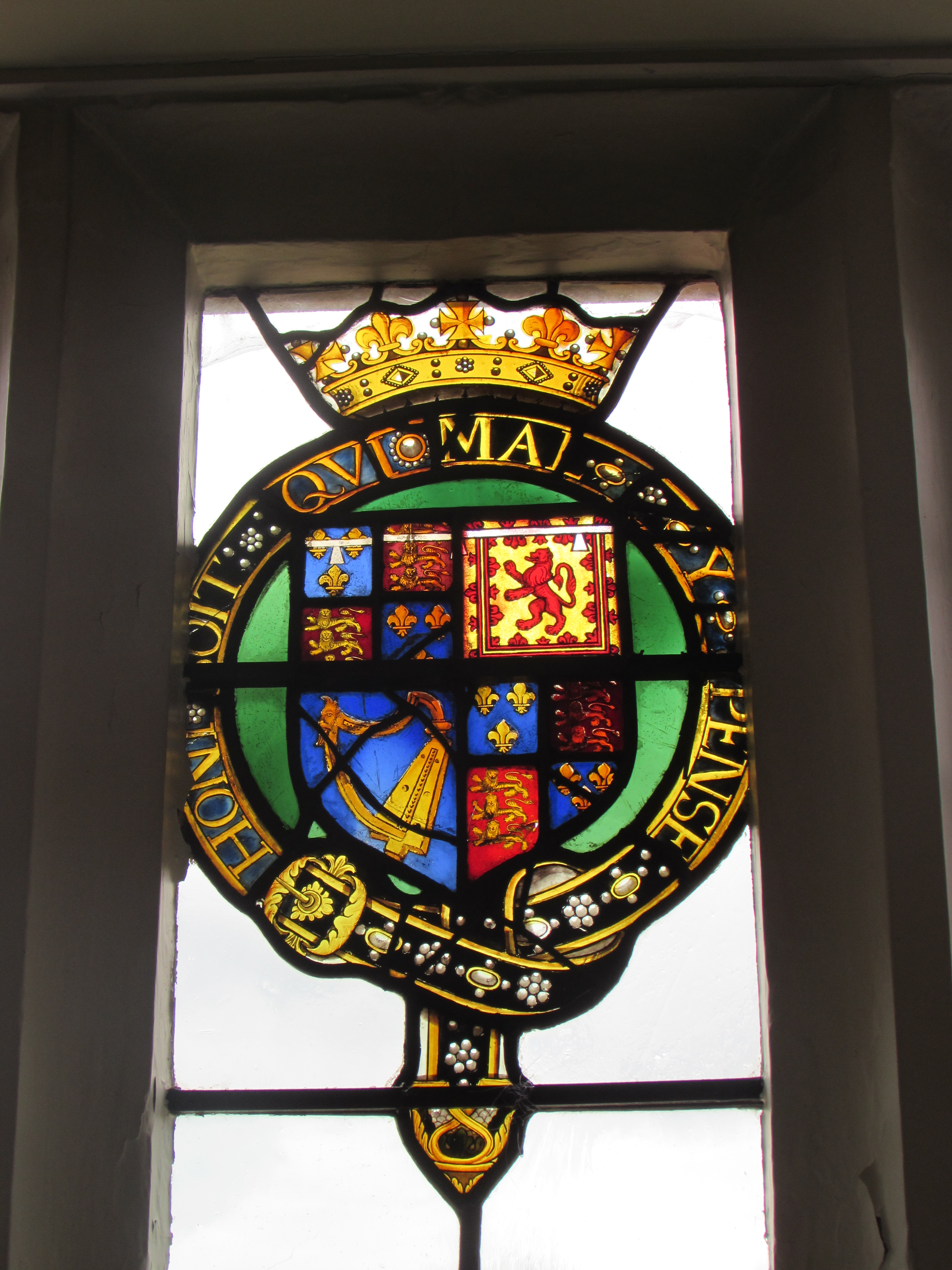
The window showing the gartered arms of Henry Frederick, Prince of Wales

In 1803 the house reverted to single occupancy for a short period, during which the tenancy was held by Sir John Slade from 1808–1852, although he ceased living there from 1829. Slade made a number of alterations including removing windows and adding buttresses to the east front, using the Abbot’s Room as the main entrance and adding a reeded white marble chimney piece to the fireplace. In 1837 the house was sub-divided again and occupied by a Mr Henry Brodribb, a solicitor and Miss Margaret Bazley (or Bazeley), headmistress of the Godolphin School, which was then housed in nearby Arundells. In 1837 the Godolphin School moved into the King's House and was transferred in 1848 when an outbreak of cholera in the city forced its evacuation to premises on Milford Hill in another part of Salisbury.

In 1849, further renovations included constructing a linking passage along the west façade which effectively hid the original 15th century exterior. In 1850, T. H. Wyatt removed the buttresses from the east face and restored the windows in Elizabethan form.

From its vacancy by the Godolphin School the King's House was used to accommodate the Diocesan Training College for Schoolmistresses. In 1873 an extension to the building was constructed to the design of Edward Doran Webb to provide dormitories, and in 1899 a further extension for a chapel, along with the installation of electricity and heating. In the window of the former chapel is a stained glass representation by Kempe of the gartered arms of Henry Frederick, Prince of Wales who had visited the house with his father in 1610 but had died before his father's second visit in 1613. This room is now used to display ceramics. It was here at The Diocesan Training College that Thomas Hardy's sisters Kate and Mary were trained, perhaps inspiring the attendance and escape from the Melchester (Salisbury) college of Sue Bridehead in Jude the Obscure, wherein the college is described.

=== 20th century ===
In 1966 the college became The College of Sarum St Michael, which closed in 1978, and a 125-year tenancy was taken up by the Salisbury Museum, which moved into the building and opened its doors to the public in 1981.

== Copy of the house ==
In 1922 a wealthy American cosmetics manufacturer, Carl Weeks and his wife, Edith were impressed with the King's House, and instructed their architects, William Whitney Rasmussen, Byron Boyd and Herbert Moore to construct a similar family house in Des Moines, Iowa. The architects visited Salisbury, took details and arranged the purchase of authentic fittings locally, including stairs, fireplaces, panelling, flooring and other materials; many items were taken from 91 Crane Street, Salisbury. The project cost $1,500,000 for the building and $1,500,000 for furnishings, and took five years to complete. Now called Salisbury House, the Des Moines house is operated as a museum.
