= Church of St Martin, Salisbury =

- Sarum St Martin
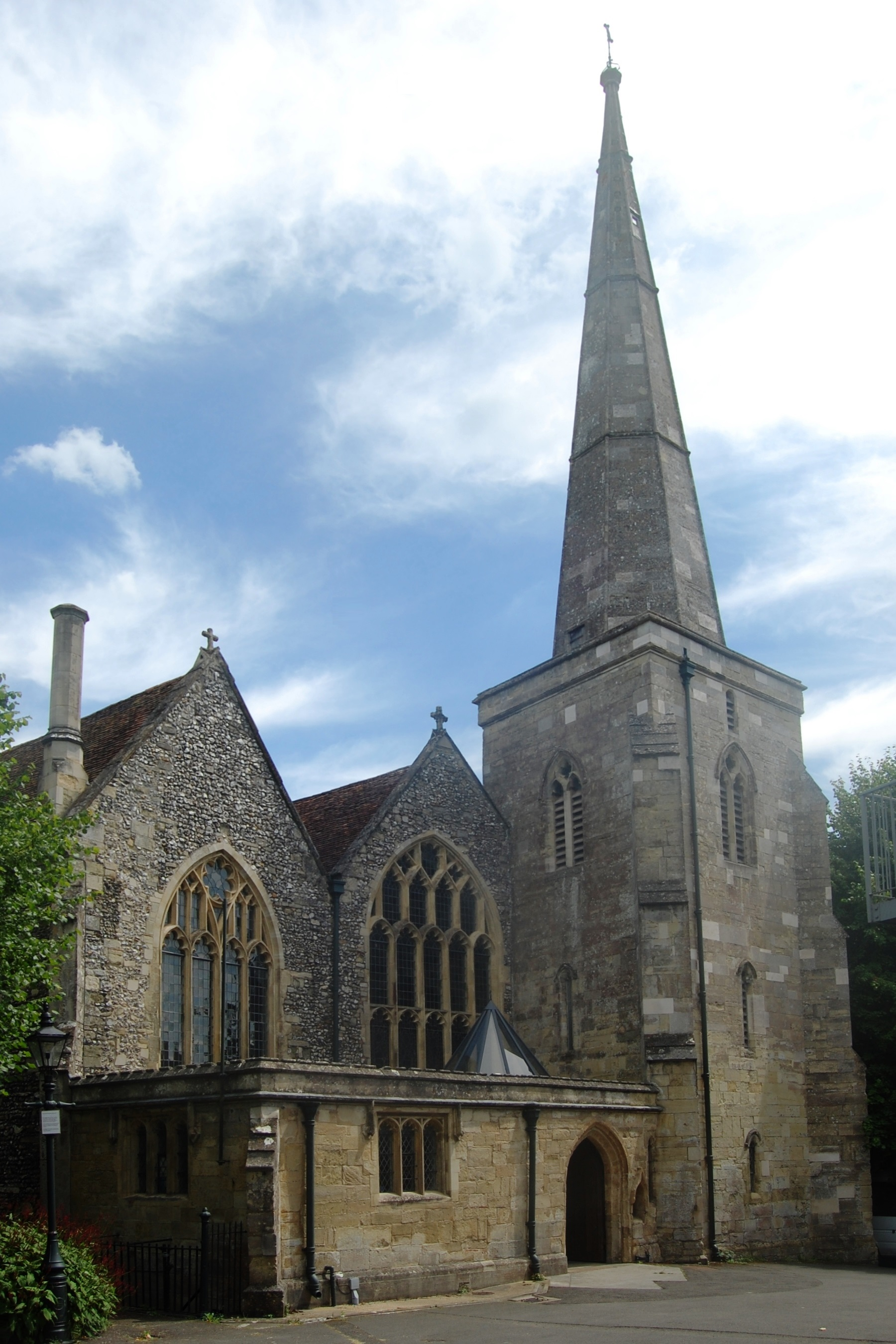
- St Martin's Church in July 2022
- Church of St Martin, Salisbury
- 51.0655°N 1.7870°W
- OS grid reference: SU15022960
- Location: St. Martin's Church Street, Salisbury, Wiltshire, SP1 2HY
- Country: England
- Denomination: Church of England
- Previous denomination: Roman Catholic
- Churchmanship: Traditional Anglo-Catholic

Architecture
- Functional status: Parish church
- Heritage designation: Grade I listed

Administration
- Province: Canterbury
- Diocese: Salisbury
- Archdeaconry: Sarum
- Deanery: Salisbury
- Parish: Salisbury St Martin

Clergy
- Bishop: The Rt Revd Paul Thomas (AEO)
- Rector: In Vacancy

The Church of St Martin, also known as Sarum St Martin, is a Church of England parish church in Salisbury, Wiltshire, England.

The church has a chancel which was built c.1230, a 14th-century tower with spire, and a 15th-century nave with aisles. From 1849 to 1850, the church building was restored by Thomas Henry Wyatt and David Brandon. In 1952, it was designated as Grade I listed.

The parish falls within the Traditional Anglo-Catholic tradition of the Church of England. As it rejects on theological grounds the ordination of women as priests and bishops, the parish receives alternative episcopal oversight from the Bishop of Oswestry (currently Paul Thomas).
