= Malmesbury House =

Grade I listed building in Salisbury, England

Coordinates: 51°03′58″N 1°47′38″W

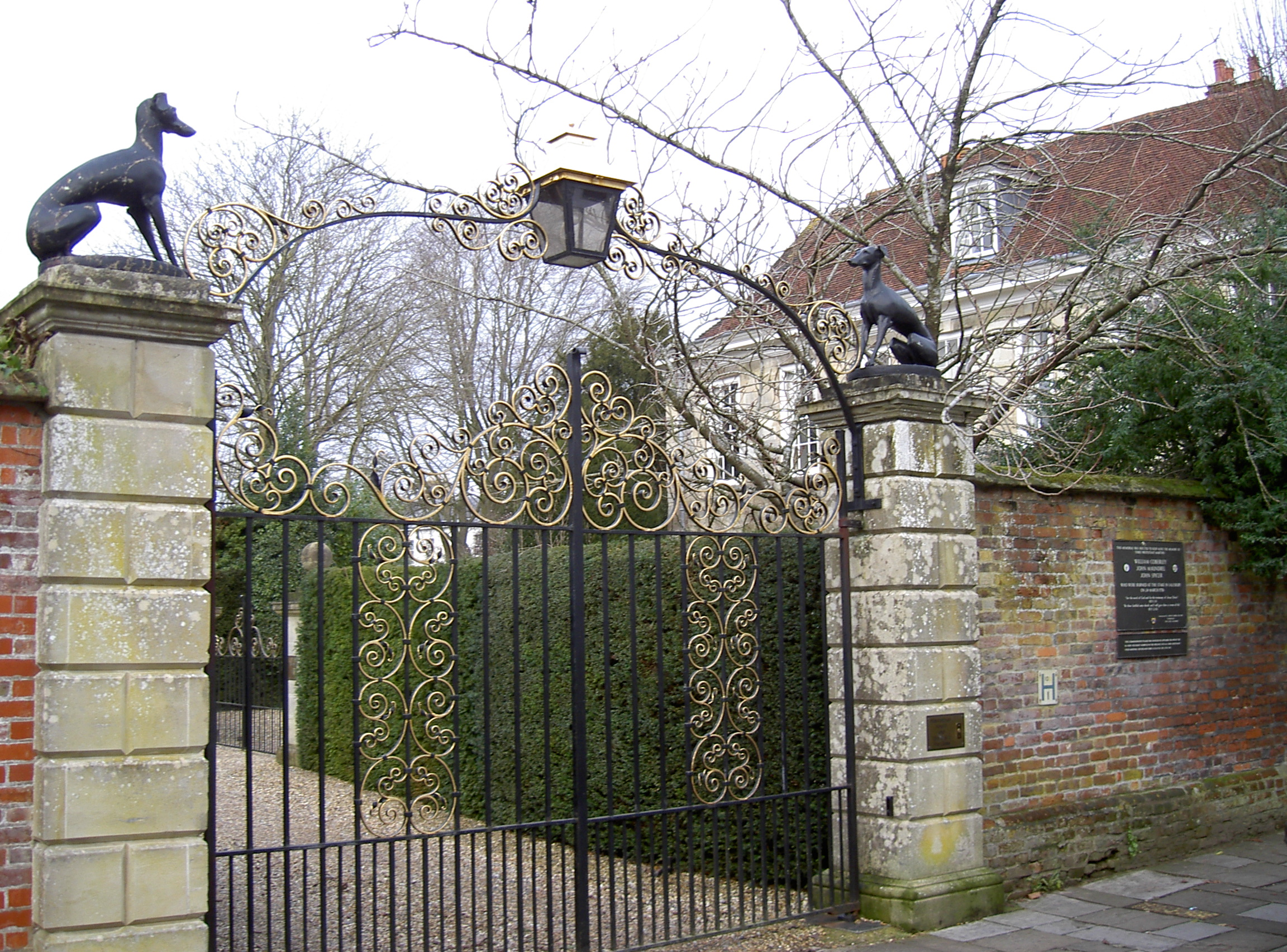
Entrance gates from the cathedral close. The house is on the right.

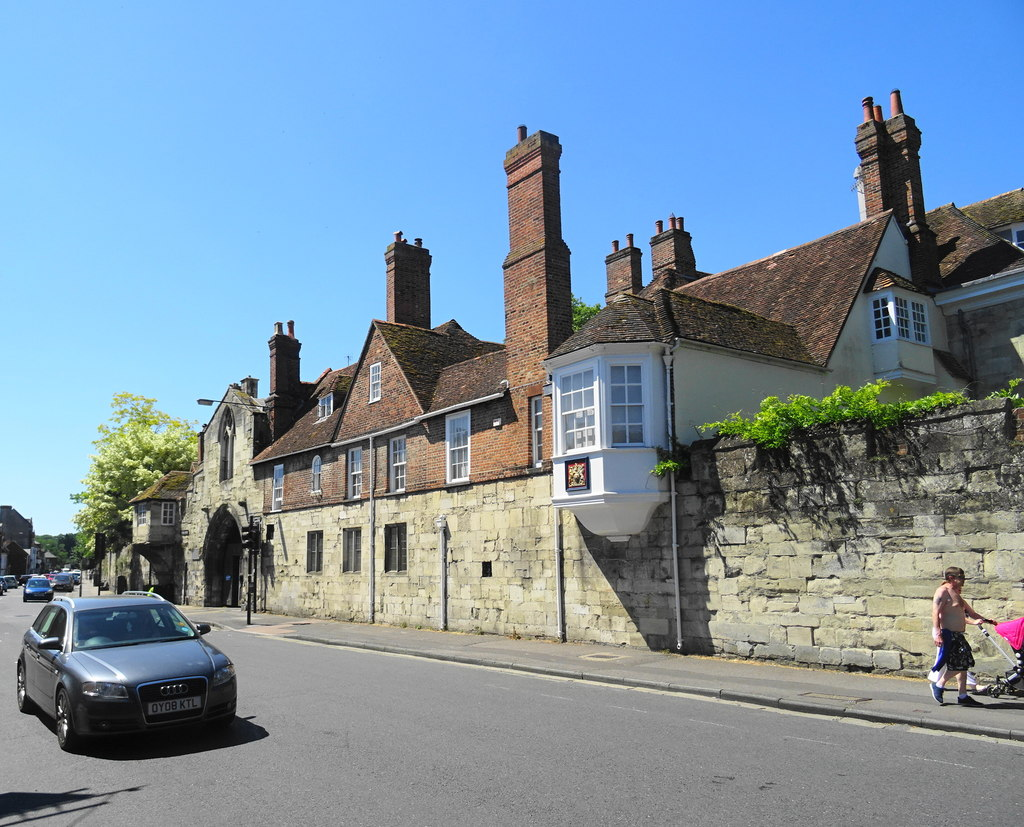
Malmesbury House and St Anne's Gate seen from St. John's Street..

Malmesbury House is a Grade I listed building in Salisbury, Wiltshire, England, in the city's cathedral close. Located on the eastern side of the close by the St Anne's Gate, it is one of numerous historic buildings in the city. It was constructed in 1416 during the late medieval era and replaced an earlier house demolished in 1399. It was known in its early years as Copt Hall, and had substantial additions made during following centuries notably in Queen Anne's reign. A plaque commemorates the three Protestant martyrs who were executed in Salisbury in 1556.

Charles II stayed at the house during the Restoration era after leaving London during an outbreak of plague. Its current name comes from its owner in the late eighteenth century, the diplomat James Harris, Earl of Malmesbury, whose family had lived there for several generations.

== See also ==
- List of Grade I listed buildings in Salisbury

== Bibliography ==
- Burrows, Donald & Dunhill, Rosemary (ed.) Music and Theatre in Handel's World: The Family Papers of James Harris, 1732–1780. Oxford University Press, 2002.
- Pevsner, Nikolaus & Cherry, Bridget. Wiltshire. Yale University Press, 2002.
- Rabbitts, Paul & Gordon, Liz. Salisbury in 50 Buildings. Amberley Publishing Limited, 2021.
