= Myles Place =

House and garden in England

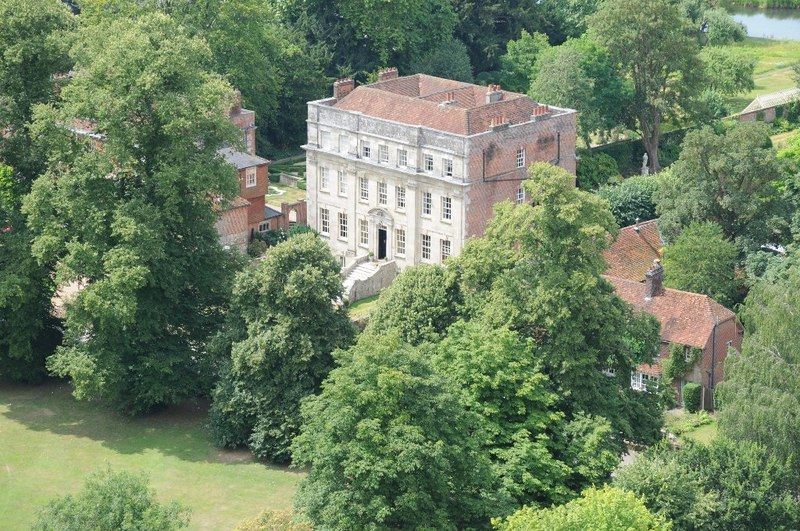

- Location within Wiltshire
- 51.0639°N 1.7999°W
- Type: House
- Location: Salisbury, Wiltshire, England

Listed Building – Grade I
- Official name: Myles Place, 68 The Close
- Designated: 28 February 1952
- Reference no.: 1261304

Listed Building – Grade I
- Official name: Retaining wall, screen railings, piers and gates to front garden of Myles Place, 68, The Close
- Designated: 12 October 1972
- Reference no.: 1023629

Listed Building – Grade II
- Official name: Two urns in front garden of Myles Place, 68, The Close
- Designated: 12 October 1972
- Reference no.: 1355815

Myles Place, No. 68 The Close, Salisbury, Wiltshire, England is a former canonry, now a private home in the close of Salisbury Cathedral. The earliest known building on the site was a medieval residence for members of the cathedral clergy. The house was rebuilt in 1720. Considered the "stateliest house in the close", it is a Grade I listed building.

== History ==
The earliest known building on the site was a medieval residence for members of the cathedral clergy. The house was rebuilt between 1718 and 1720, either for William Swanton, the town clerk of Salisbury, or for his brother Francis, who served as the city's member of parliament. The Swantons were long established in the area as lawyers, landowners and local worthies, an earlier William Swanton having served as M.P. in the 1670s.

In the 20th century, the house was home to Sir Arthur Bryant, the historian, who lived there from the end of the Second World War until his death in 1985. It was then bought by Sir Philip Shelbourne, a lawyer and financier. (Note: Philip Shelbourne spent a great deal of time and money on restoring Myles Place but, by the time of his moving into the house in 1988, his health had declined and his death in 1993 gave him little time to enjoy it.) (Note: After the deaths of Arthur Bryant and Philip Shelbourne, both of whom were notable collectors of antiques, major sales of the contents of Myles Place were held by Christie's.)

== Architecture and description ==
Myles Place is of four storeys and seven bays, and faced with ashlar. Pevsner describes it as "the grandest 18th century house in the close", suggesting that its ostentation is almost excessive in relation to its country location. (Note: Pevsner suggests stylistic similarities with Clarendon Park, another early 18th century house, built just outside of Salisbury.) It is a Grade I listed building. Its entrance screen has a separate Grade I listing.

== Sources ==
- Orbach, Julian; Pevsner, Nikolaus; Cherry, Bridget (2021). Wiltshire. The Buildings Of England. New Haven, US and London: Yale University Press. ISBN 978-0-300-25120-3. OCLC 1255836347.
