= Salisbury Cathedral School =

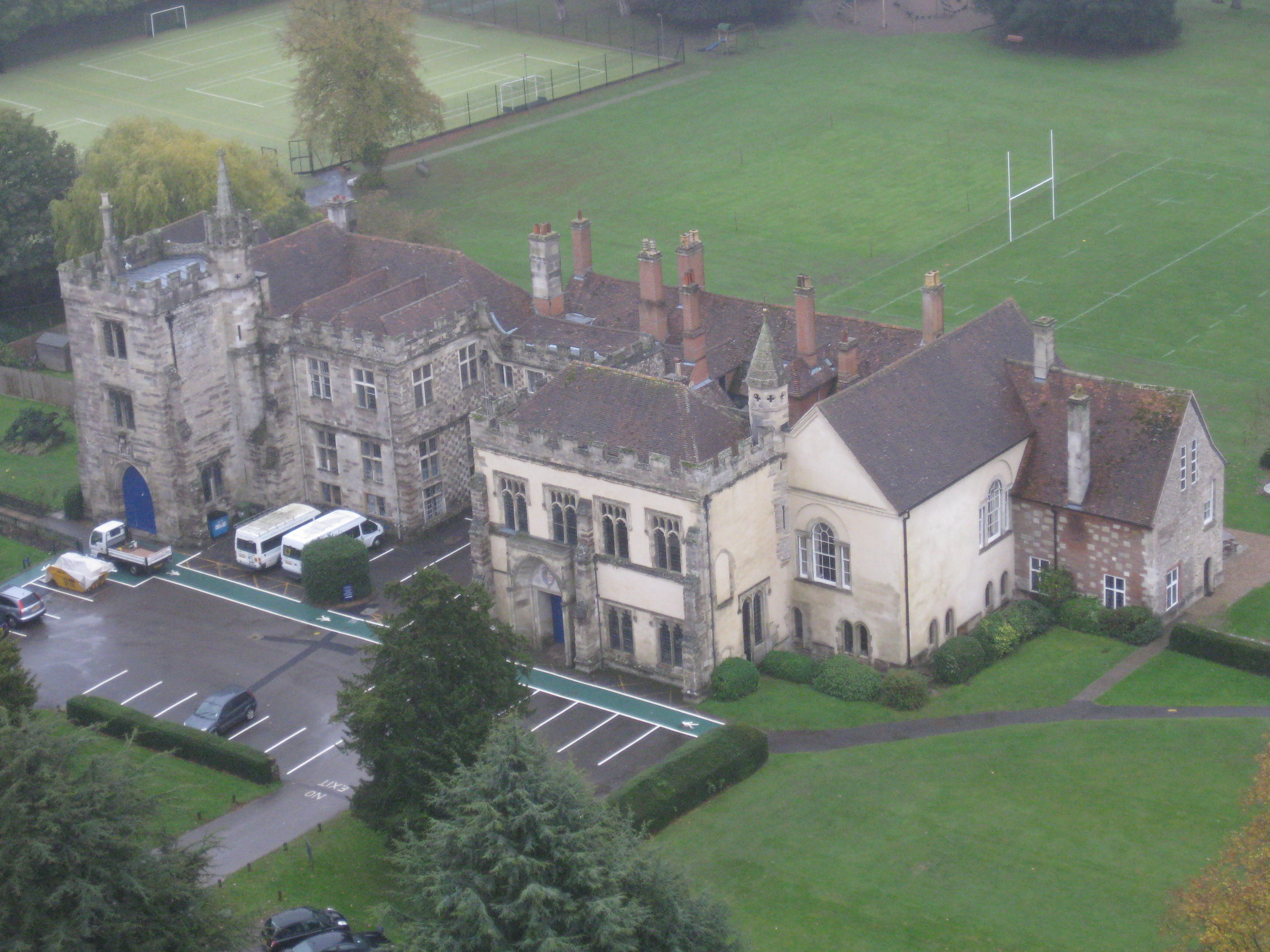

Location
- 1 The Close; Salisbury, Wiltshire, SP1 2EQ; England; 51.0637°N 1.7961°W

Information
- Type: Private preparatory day and boarding school Choral foundation school Cathedral school
- Motto: Domine dilexi decorem domus tuae
- Religious affiliation: Church of England
- Established: 1091; 935 years ago
- Founder: Saint Osmund
- Department for Education URN: 126518 Tables
- Chair of Governors: James Clements
- Headmaster: Sally Moulton
- Staff: 38
- Gender: Mixed
- Age: 3 to 13
- Enrolment: 220 (October 2023)
- Houses: 4
- Website: www.salisburycathedralschool.com

Salisbury Cathedral School is a co-educational private school in Salisbury, Wiltshire, England, which was founded in 1091 by Saint Osmund. The choristers of Salisbury Cathedral are educated at the school.

== History ==
The school was founded in 1091 at Old Sarum by Saint Osmund, the Bishop of Salisbury and Earl of Dorset, who was canonised in 1456. Osmund was born in Normandy and was a first cousin of William the Conqueror, King of England: William's father, Robert the Magnificent, Duke of Normandy, was the brother of Isabella, Countess of Séez, the mother of Osmund.

The first notable pupil of the school was John of Salisbury, who served Archbishop Thomas Becket until the latter was murdered in 1170. In the 12th century, the school was no doubt housed near the cathedral at Old Sarum. At the start of the 13th century, the centre of the Diocese of Salisbury was moved from Old Sarum to its present site, and the choristers must have lodged with canons in the new Cathedral Close. After 1319, a house was built in the Close to accommodate the school (known as 'The Choristers' House'), and the school remained here for the next 300 years. The choristers were educated in the Chancellor's Grammar School nearby.

In 1335, most of the students of the College of the Valley Scholars near the cathedral transferred to Salisbury Hall, Oxford, and after that the College was "practically a nursery for a few scholars attending the Cathedral Grammar School" until the Reformation, when it was dissolved.

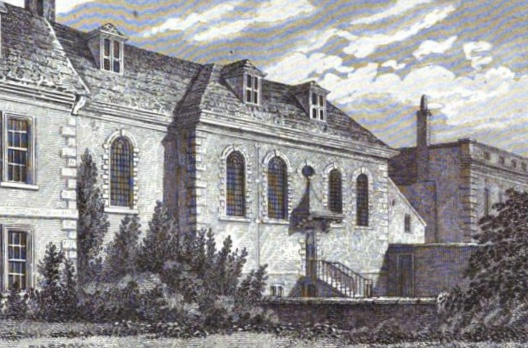
The school in the Close, Salisbury, c. 1827

In 1714, the school moved to a new School House built for it on the northwest side of The Close. This became known as Wren Hall. The house connected to it, Braybrooke House, was the home of the Chancellor's Grammar School.

In 1818, as reported by Nicholas Carlisle, the school was known as the Close School, distinguishing it from the City School. He understood that it had been founded by Bishop Herbert Poore.

In 1847, Bishop Hamilton combined the Cathedral School, or Choristers' School, with the Chancellor's Grammar School, and the school was thereafter known as the Cathedral School.

As the site in the Close could not keep pace with the growing number of pupils, in 1946 the school was relocated to the former Bishop's Palace in the grounds of the cathedral. The building is designated as Grade I listed by English Heritage.

In 1987, the first girls were admitted. The cathedral became the first in England to have female choristers when it opened its choristership programme to girls in 1991.

A library partly funded by the former bookshop chain Ottakar's was opened in October 2002. Two members of the Heneage family, who owned the company, were former pupils.

It was announced in 2026 that the school would cease to offer a boarding provision from September 2027.

=== Leaden Hall School ===
In 2016, Leaden Hall School, a nearby independent school for girls aged 2 to 13, was merged into Salisbury Cathedral School. At first, the Leaden Hall site was to be for younger pupils at the enlarged school.

The Leaden Hall site, owned by the dean and chapter, is west of the former Bishop's Palace, on West Walk, and is bounded to the west by the River Avon. Its buildings include Leaden Hall (or Leadenhall), which has its origins in one of the first stone houses constructed in the new cathedral close, as a canon's residence. The present house is a 1717 rebuilding to the north, reusing some of the older stonework. Of two storeys under a tiled roof, the west front has four bays (including a later northern bay) and a 19th-century Gothic porch. The building was designated as Grade I listed in 1952.

Occupants of Leaden Hall include Henry Chichele (d. 1443), archdeacon, chancellor, and later Archbishop of Canterbury; Gilbert Kymer (d. 1463), Dean of Salisbury and twice Chancellor of Oxford University; and (after the rebuilding), John Fisher (1748–1825), Bishop of Salisbury.

There was a school on the site from at least 1953. A charity was linked to the school from 1963 to 2018. In 2003 there were 261 pupils, including 40 boarders, and around the time of the merger there were 130.

== Location ==
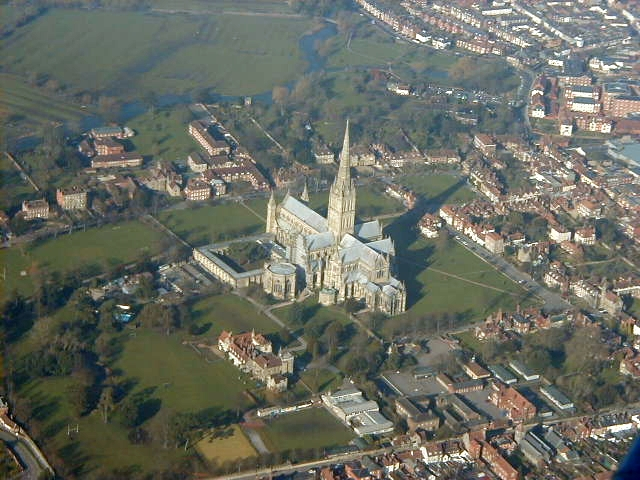
Salisbury Cathedral School (below left of centre)

The school's 27-acre campus is next to Bishop Wordsworth's School, in the southern part of Salisbury Cathedral Close, which at 80 acres (320,000 m^{2}) is the largest Cathedral Close in Britain. The main school building is the former Bishop's Palace, parts of which date from the building of the cathedral in the 13th century. The pre-preparatory part of the school is located in newer buildings adjacent to the palace, but uses some of the main school facilities. The boarding house is also in The Close. Sports facilities include football, rugby and cricket pitches, an athletics track, tennis courts/hockey pitches (Astro Turf) and an outdoor swimming pool.

== Academics ==
Scholarships are offered on entry to the school at Years 3 and 6, with choral scholarships offered at Years 4 and 5. An exchange programme with pupils from Union High School, South Africa, is available to Year 7 students.

Pupils generally take the Common Entrance Exam at the end of Year 8 and many progress to senior private schools. Some also leave at Year 6 for local grammar schools, or other independent schools.

== Choir ==
The school continues to serve its original function of educating choristers of the cathedral choir. Every year auditions are held for children between ages 7 and 9 and successful applicants receive scholarships to attend the school. It was the first English cathedral to allow girls to become choristers, and is unique in that the girls have equal duties with the boys. Many choristers board in a large boarding house located near the school.

== In media ==
The school featured in a BBC television documentary entitled Angelic Voices: The Choristers of Salisbury Cathedral, which was first broadcast in March 2012.

== Notable former pupils ==
- John of Salisbury (c. 1120–1180): Author, diplomat and Bishop of Chartres
- Henry Lawes (1595–1662): Musician and composer. A Gentleman of the Chapel Royal in the reigns of King Charles I & King Charles II. He was appointed Musician in the 'Private Musick for the Voices' to King Charles II. (Buried in Westminster Abbey).
- William Lawes (1602–1645): Brother of Henry Lawes (above). Composer and musician. Appointed as 'Musician in Ordinary for Lutes and Voices' to King Charles I. He was killed during the rout of the Royalists at the Battle of Rowton Heath.
- Edward Lowe (c.1602–1682): Composer, author & organist. Professor of Music at Oxford University (1671–1682).
- Sir Stephen Fox (1627–1716): [Noted in John Evelyn's Diary as ‘…a poore boy from the quire of Salisbury’]. Founder of The Royal Hospital, Chelsea; Commissioner of the Treasury.
- Thomas Wyndham, 1st Baron Wyndham of Finglass (1681–1745): Lawyer; Lord Chancellor of Ireland (1728); Lord High Steward of Ireland (1739).
- John Greenhill (1644?–1676): English portrait painter and draughtsman (Associated with 24 major portraits). Pupil of Sir Peter Lely.
- Henry Greenhill (1646–1708): (Brother of John Greenhill, above) As a Commissioner of the Admiralty, directed the building of Plymouth Dockyard.
- James Harris (1709–1780): Grammarian and politician.
- James Harris, 1st Earl of Malmesbury GCB (1746–1820): Son of the above and noted diplomat.
- William Benson Earle (1740–1796): Author & composer.
- Sir George Ridout Bingham, KCB (1777–1833): Army Officer in the Peninsular War. Commanded the garrison of St.Helena guarding the Emperor Napoleon.
- Bernard George Ellis (1890–1979): Winner of the George Cross in 1918.
- Walter Kendall Stanton (1891–1978): Organist & composer. Director of BBC Midland Radio Music. Editor of the BBC Hymn Book. First Professor of Music at Bristol University.
- Stephen Clissold (1913–1982): Author: subjects include mediæval mystics, Latin America & Yugoslavia. In 2nd World War, worked with the British Mission to Yugoslavia. He was the interpreter between Sir Winston Churchill & Marshal Tito at their first meeting.
- Doctor Bernard Rose (1916–1996): Don, organist and master of the choristers, Magdalen College, Oxford.
- Professor John Blacking (1928–1990): Anthropologist and ethnomusicologist.
- Professor Nicholas Daniel (born 1962): Oboist & conductor.
- David Gascoyne (1916–2001): Surrealist poet.
- Air Vice-Marshal David Hills CB OBE (born 1925)
- Robert Key MP (born 1945): Conservative politician.
- Michael Mates MP (born 1934): Conservative politician.
- Martin Woodhouse (1932–2011): Author and scriptwriter.
- Jonathan Meades (born 1947): Writer and television film-maker.
- Mike Wedgwood (born 1950): Bass guitarist, formerly a member of The Overlanders, Curved Air and Caravan.
- Robert Wilkie (born 1962): Former United Secretary of Veterans Affairs.

== See also ==
- List of the oldest schools in the United Kingdom
