= Hemingsby House =

Building in Salisbury, Wiltshire, England

Coordinates: 51.0668°N 1.7992°W

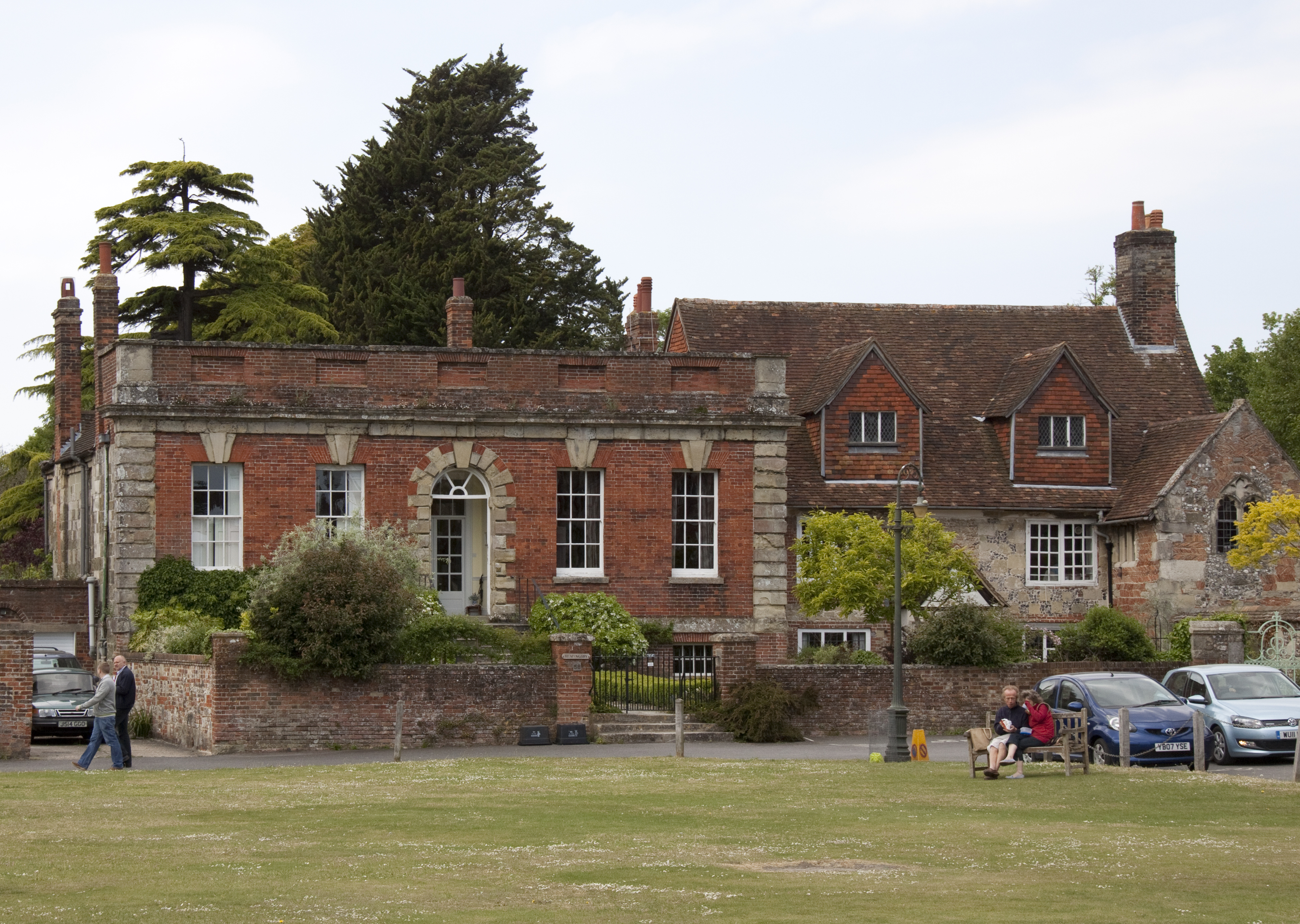
Hemingsby House, front façades

Hemingsby House is a Grade I listed, 14th-century house in Salisbury, England, in the north-west corner of Salisbury Cathedral Close, overlooking Choristers' Green.

Although constructed as one house, it has two parts in different architectural styles, giving the impression of two separate buildings. In modern times it has been altered to provide two separate houses. It is generally believed to have been built in the 14th century by Alexander de Hemyngsby, the first recorded warden of the Choristers' School in 1322. Apart from the chapel, most of the building was reconstructed in the middle of the 15th century by Nicholas Upton. He was succeeded by Thomas Fideon who completed the reconstruction and whose name appears on some architectural decorations in the house.

Edward Powell lived at Hemyngsby in 1525. He served as counsel to Catherine of Aragon at the hearing of Henry VIII's divorce suit against her. Powell met with much disapproval from Henry, and after Catherine's death he was tried for treason in London and hanged, drawn and quartered at Smithfield.

In 1547–1550 the house was occupied by the Reverend Simon Symonds who may have been the vicar of Bray in the traditional folksong.

The south part of the house, No 56B, was partly rebuilt in 1727 by Canon Joseph Sayer to replace a decaying previous extension. It has a prominent parapet with panels, even stone quoins on the front and an arched door surrounded by rusticated quoins with a semi-circular fanlight above it. There are four sash windows with stone keystones and four windows to the semi-basement. Stone steps lead up to the front door. The roof is hipped front to back and medieval stone has been used to construct the rear façade.

No 56A has a pitched, tiled roof with two dormers, a brick, rubble stone and flint dressed façade with four windows. The north wall contains many tiles laid in herring-bone pattern. The porch has a gable decorated with carved stone shields and a round arch over the door.

In 1840 the number of residentiary canons at the cathedral was reduced from six to four, and Hemingsby ceased to be a canonry in 1848 on the death of the then resident, the Reverend Matthew Marsh.

The house was designated as Grade I listed in 1952.

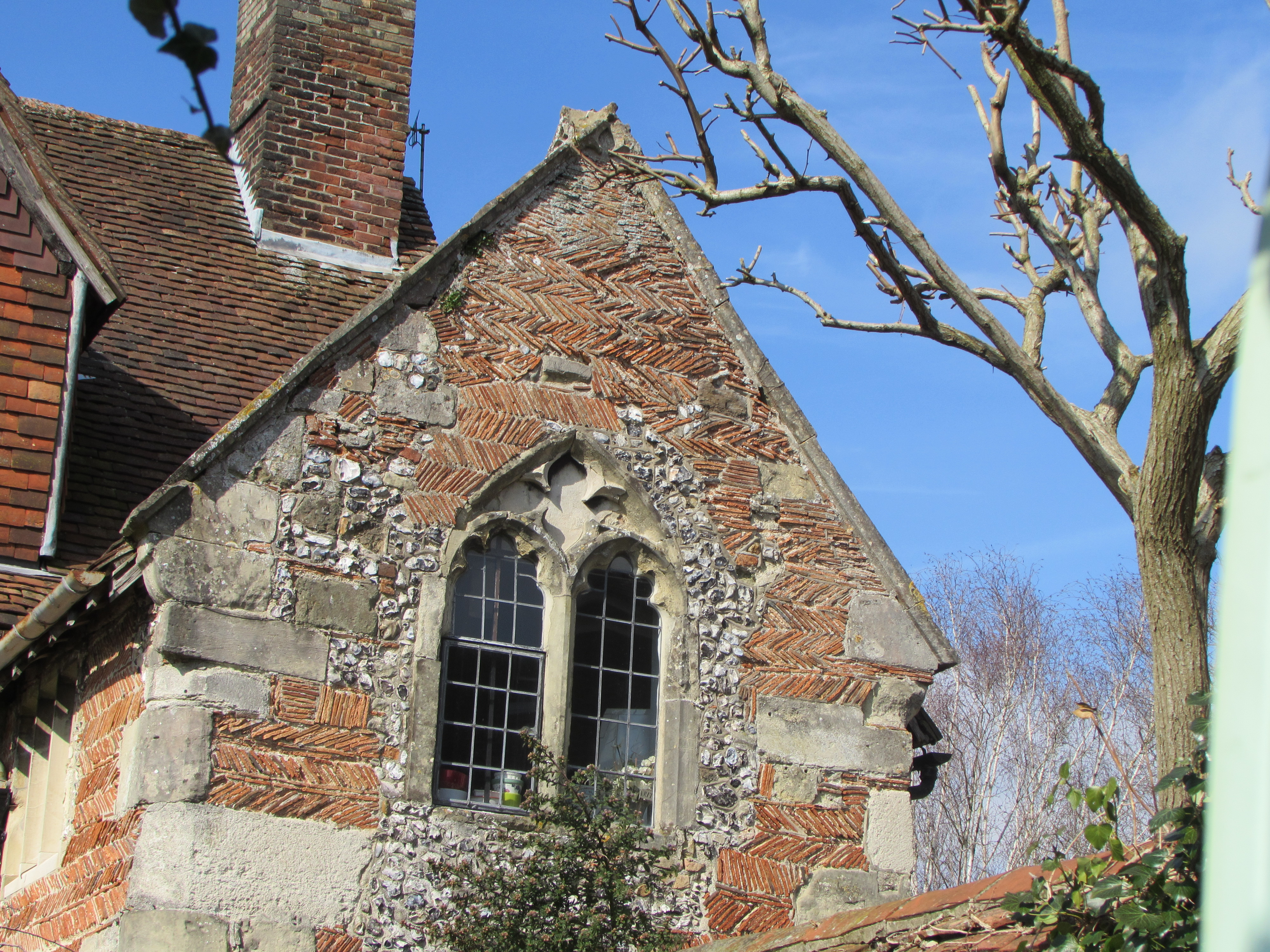
Showing tiles laid herringbone in the wall

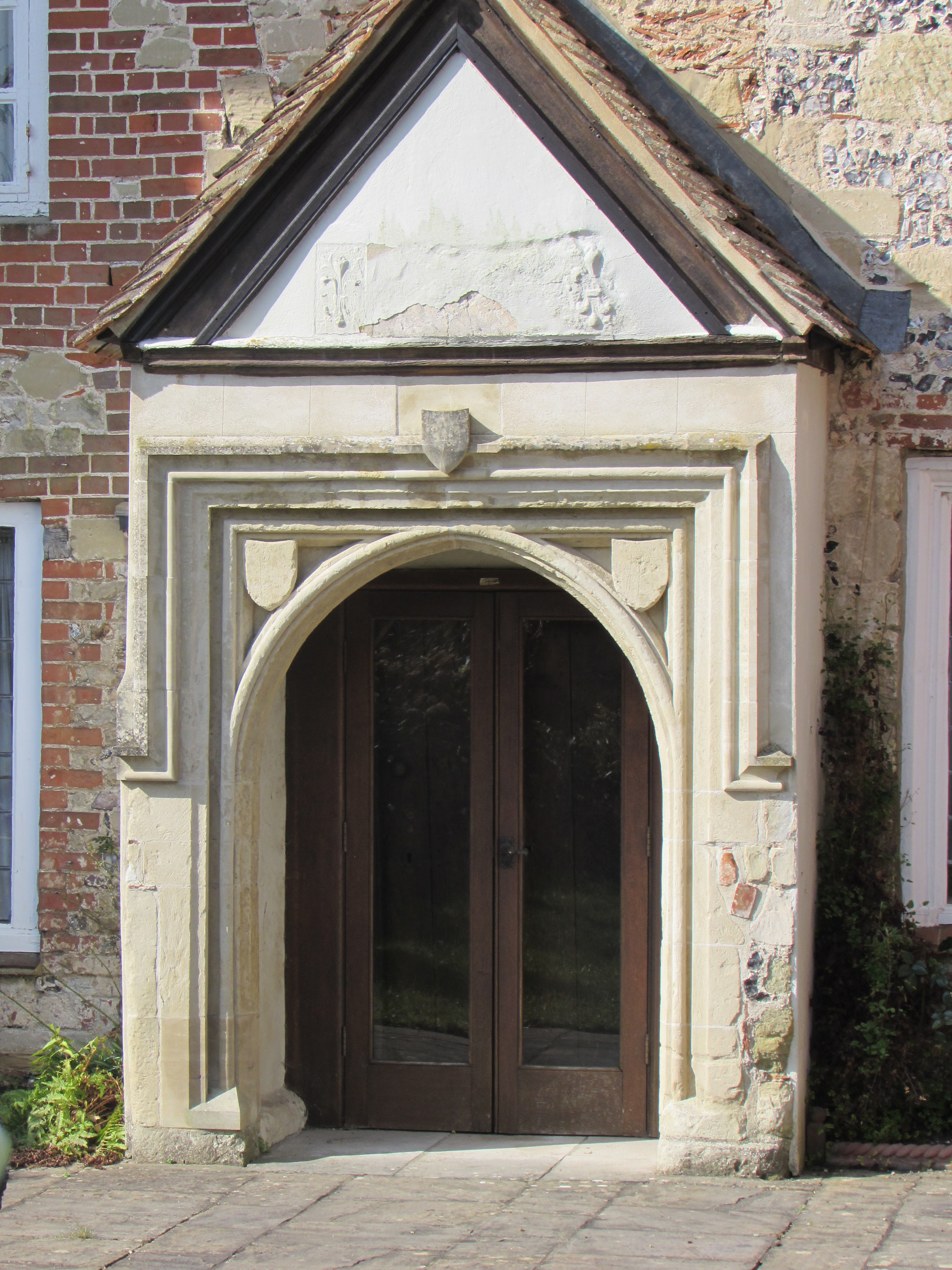
Porch with decorative moulding
