= John Sponlee =

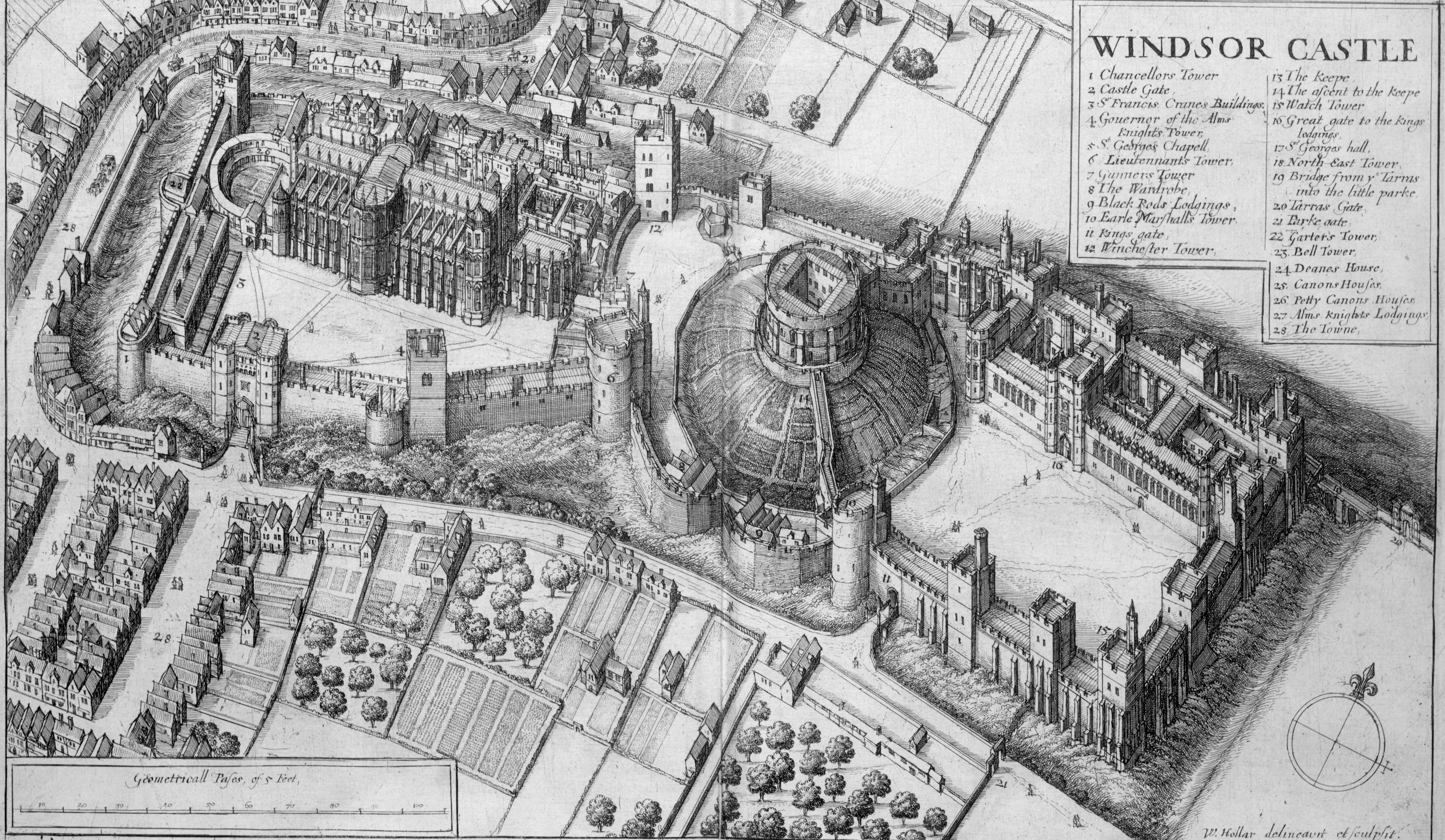
Wenceslaus Hollar's view of Windsor Castle, before Jeffry Wyattville's 19th century reconstructions. The 14th century palace is on the right.

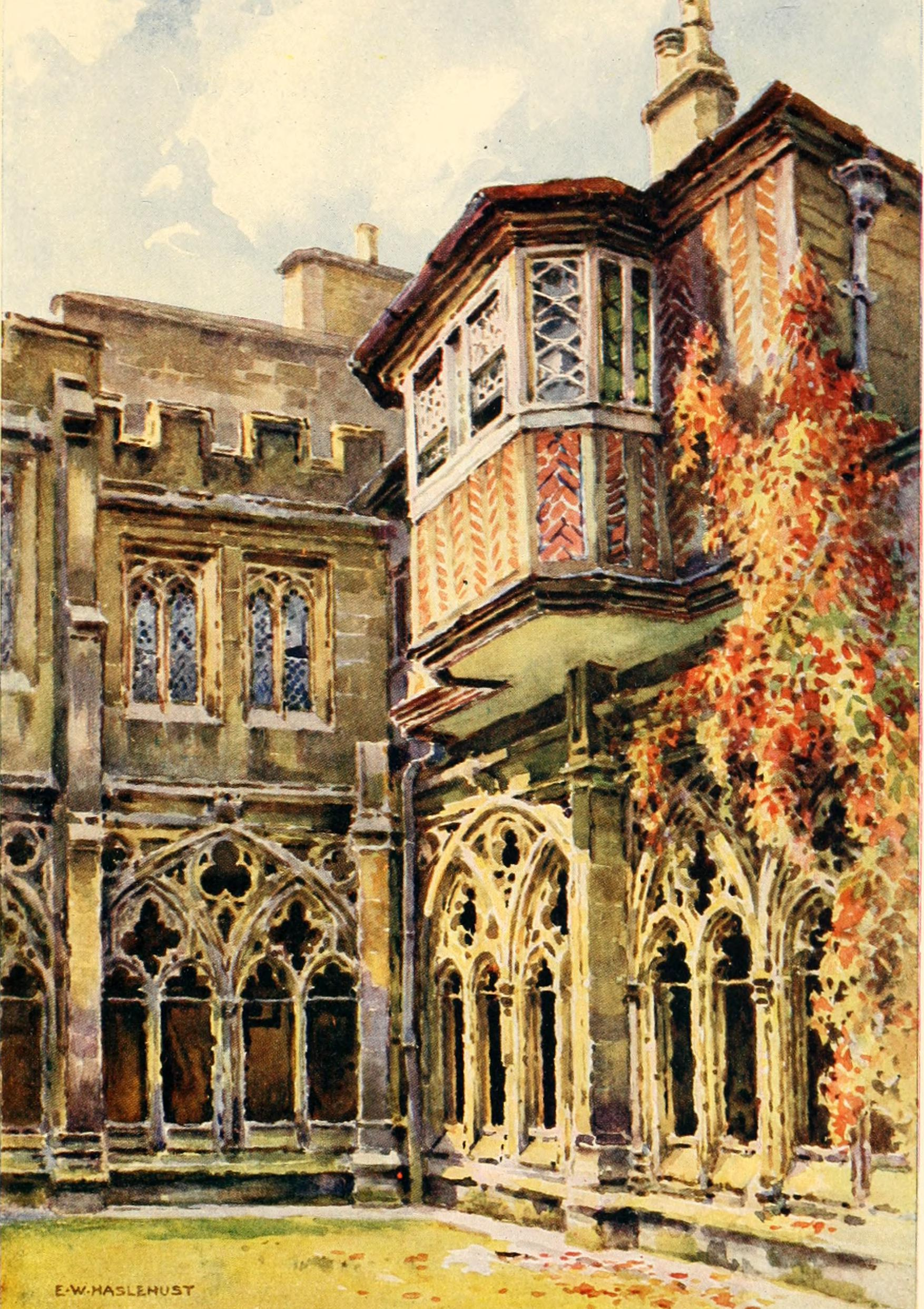
The Dean's Cloister at Windsor Castle

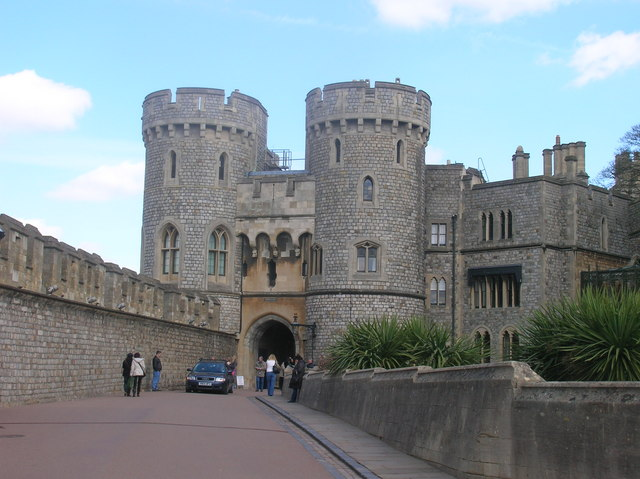
The Norman Gate at Windsor. The left-hand tower is 19th century.

John Sponlee (died c. 1386) was an English Gothic master mason, responsible for the collegiate buildings of the Order of the Garter at Windsor Castle (1353). These works included the Dean's Cloister and Aerary Porch, which still survive. He was one of the earliest designers to use the Perpendicular style, employing blind tracery and stellar vaults at Windsor. He also designed Edward III's wider reordering at Windsor, with the Norman Gate and a vast new palace in the Upper Ward (1359) around three courtyards, one of the first secular buildings in England to feature an ordered façade. In this project he was assisted by the mason William Wynford and the clerk of works, William of Wykeham. Wykeham was later to become bishop of Winchester and employ Wynford to design Winchester College and New College, Oxford, spreading the Perpendicular style across the country.
