= Adam Houghton =

Lord Chancellor of England; Bishop of St David's

Doctor Adam Houghton
- Bishop of St David's
- Province: Canterbury
- Diocese: St David's
- Installed: 2 January 1362
- Term ended: 13 February 1389
- Predecessor: Thomas Fastolf
- Successor: John Gilbert
- Other posts: Lord Chancellor, 1377–1378

Orders
- Ordination: unknown
- Consecration: 1361

Personal details
- Born: Perhaps at Whitchurch, Pembrokeshire, date unknown.
- Died: 13 February 1389 St David's
- Denomination: Roman Catholic
- Education: Oxford

Adam Houghton (died 13 February 1389), also known as Adam de Houghton, was Bishop of St David's from 1361 until his death and Lord Chancellor of England from 1377 to 1378.

A Doctor of Laws and an advocate of the Court of Arches, he was also sent on missions to France for King Edward III. In April 1377, with the Caroline War going badly for the English, Edward sent Houghton to seek a peace settlement with Charles V of France, but in June Edward died, and Houghton was recalled. In 1380 he helped to negotiate the marriage of King Richard II to Anne of Bohemia.

== Early life ==
It was long reported, by a local tradition dating at least from the 16th century, that Houghton had been born in Dewisland, or the immediate neighbourhood of St David's, although from his name he is plainly of an English or Anglo-Norman family. There is a long-standing local claim that the farm of Caerforiog, in the parish of Whitchurch, Pembrokeshire, was his birthplace, and this is stated as a fact in the Oxford Dictionary of National Biography, although Wilkinson's The Chancery under Edward III reports that there is "slender evidence" for it. In 1856 a small medieval building survived at Caerforiog, then in use as an outhouse, which had a doorway with an ogee head, possibly dating from the 14th century.

He was educated at the University of Oxford, and by 1340 had graduated Doctor of Laws. In 1338, an Adam de Houton, clerk of Oxford, was accused of wounding a man named John le Blake of Tadyngton, and Anthony Wood thought it likely this was Houghton.

== Career ==
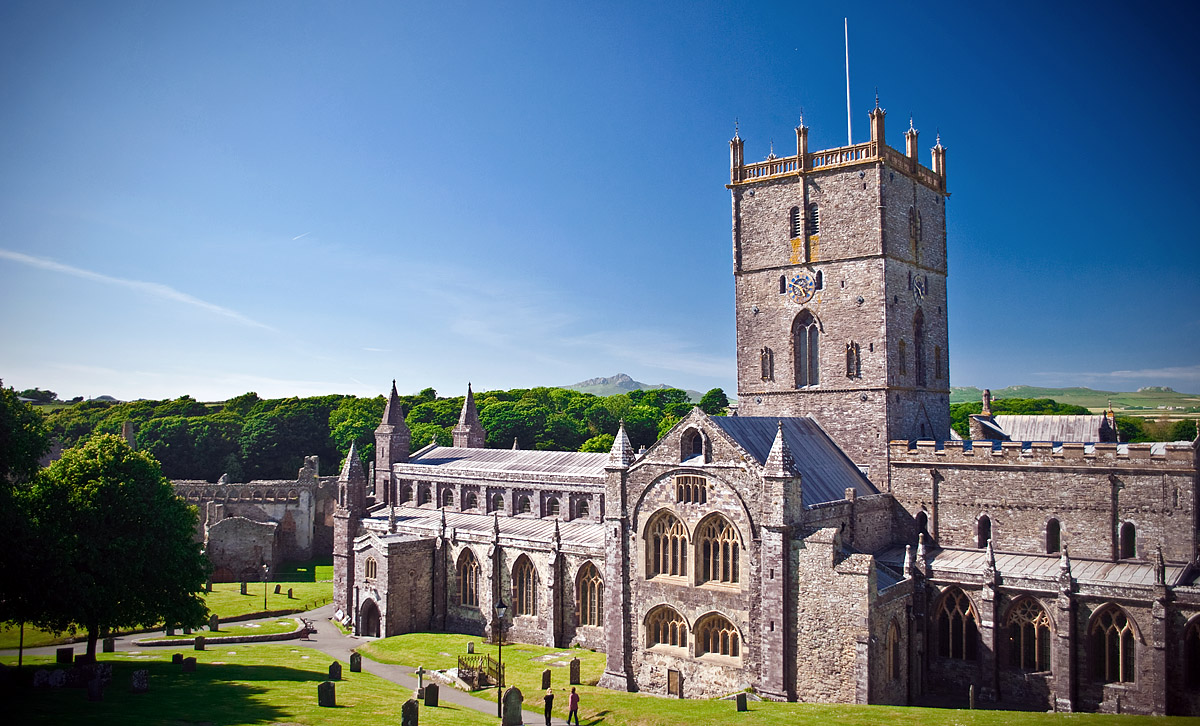
St David's Cathedral

Houghton gained the office of precentor in St David's Cathedral, to which he was admitted on 26 December 1339. In June 1344, Houghton and Geoffrey Scrope were in dispute with the university of Oxford over elections. He resigned as precentor about 1350, and had become a king's clerk by 1352. On 18 July 1355 he was admitted as an advocate at the Court of Arches. In 1360 and 1361 he was in France on business for King Edward III. On 20 September 1361 Pope Innocent VI provided him to be Bishop of St David's, and he was consecrated a bishop by William Evendon, bishop of Winchester, at St Mary's, Southwark.

Houghton received possession of the temporalities of St David's on 8 December 1361 and was consecrated to the diocese on 2 January 1361/62. While bishop, Houghton endowed the choristers and was the first founder of the cathedral school. In 1365, with John of Gaunt, he founded, endowed, and began to build the College (or chantry) of St Mary, with the object of increasing the number of clergy and choristers, and later built the cloister which connects it to the cathedral. Although he appears to have worked conscientiously as Bishop of St David's, he was simultaneously receiver in parliament for the trial of petitions from 1363 to 1367.

He also served on a Royal Commission appointed to settle disputes at the University of Oxford, and at some point in his career he was in the service of the priory of Arundel.

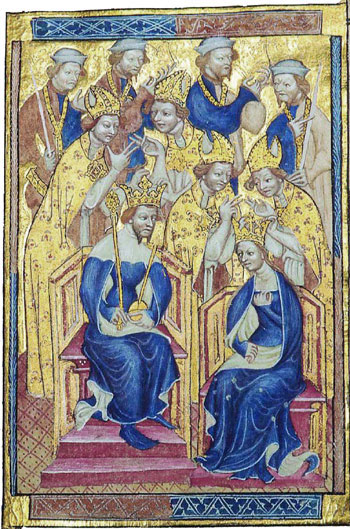
Richard II and his queen, Anne of Bohemia, from the Liber Regalis

On 11 January 1377, five months before the death of Edward III, Houghton was appointed Lord Chancellor of England. The most likely cause of this is that he was chosen by John of Gaunt, whose friend he was, and that his very obscurity and lack of political and administrative skill recommended him to Gaunt. His speech to the opening session of the parliament of January 1377 was noted for its tactlessness. Two letters from Gaunt to Houghton survive which begin "Our reverend father in God, and our great friend..."

At this time, the Caroline War, a phase of the Hundred Years' War, was going badly for the English in France. Houghton immediately led a commission sent to France to negotiate for peace with Charles the Wise, but when in June Edward III died, he was called home. Under the new king, Richard II, Houghton was reappointed as chancellor on 26 June 1377, but he was replaced by Lord Scrope on 29 October 1378.

In 1380 Richard II sent Houghton to begin negotiations for his marriage to Anne of Bohemia. These were ultimately successful.

From 1379, Houghton and William Nicoll, prebendary of Llanddewi Brefi, were embroiled in litigation at the Roman Curia which dragged on until 1382. Houghton made a Will on 8 February 1388/89 and died a few days later, on 13 February, at St David's. He was entombed in the chapel of his new college, but his tomb was later destroyed and his remains were moved into the cathedral in 1965.

== See also ==
- List of lord chancellors and lord keepers

== Notes ==
Religious titles
Preceded by Thomas Fastolf	Bishop of St David's; 1361–1389	Succeeded by John Gilbert
Political offices
Preceded by John Knyvet	Lord Chancellor; 1377–1378	Succeeded by Richard Scrope
