= Thomas Arundel =

English archbishop (1353–1414)

The Most Reverend Thomas Arundel
- Archbishop of Canterbury
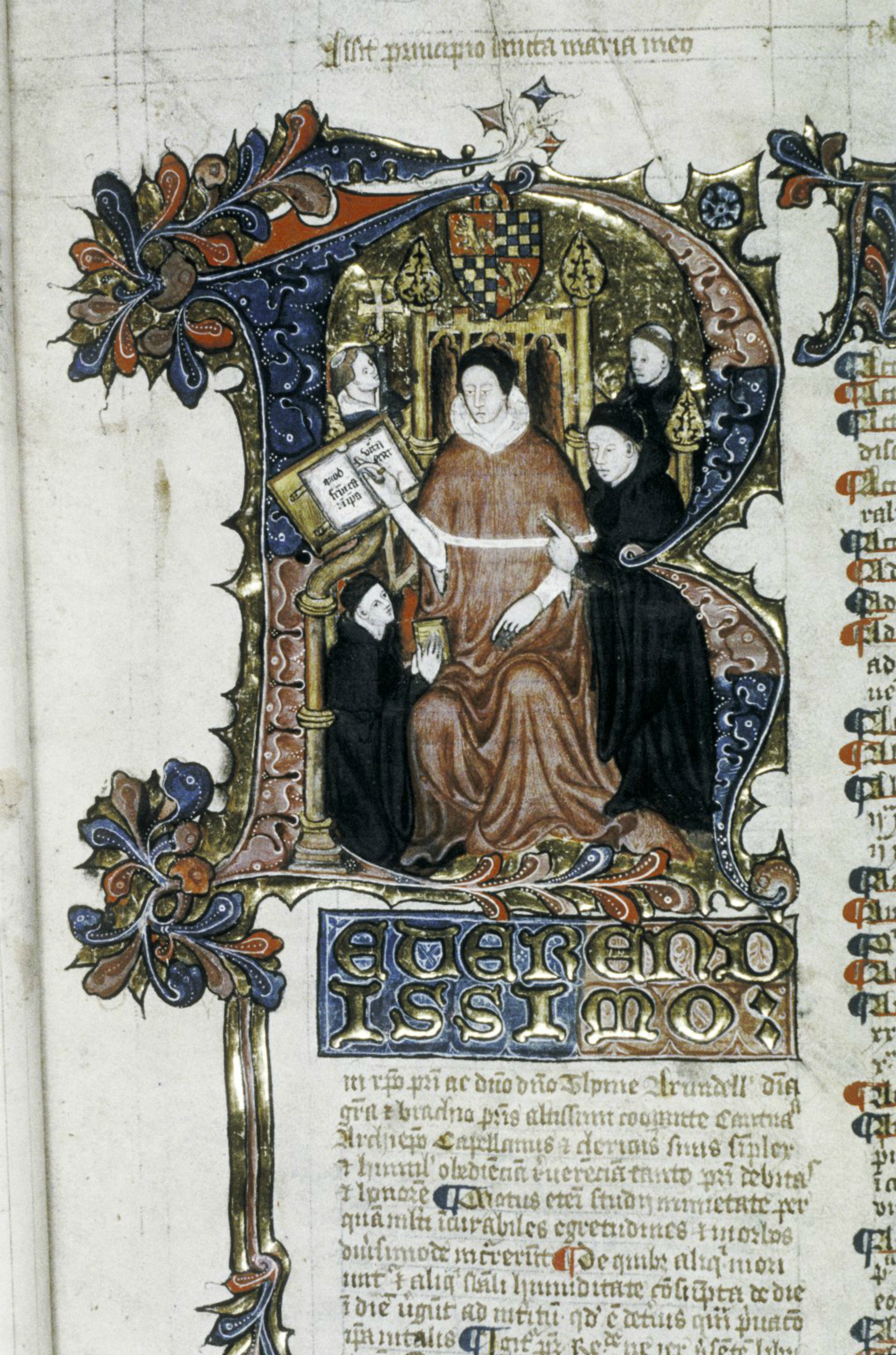
- Late-14th-century illumination depicting Arundel
- Church: Catholic Church
- Appointed: 25 September 1396
- Term ended: 19 February 1414
- Predecessor: William Courtenay
- Successor: Henry Chichele
- Other posts: Bishop of Ely; Archbishop of York

Orders
- Consecration: 9 April 1374 by William Whittlesey

Personal details
- Born: 1353 Etchingham, Sussex, Kingdom of England
- Died: 19 February 1414 (aged 60–61)

Thomas Fitzalan (1353 – 19 February 1414), known as Thomas Arundel, was an English clergyman who served as Lord Chancellor and Archbishop of York during the reign of Richard II, as well as Archbishop of Canterbury in 1397 and from 1399 until his death, an outspoken opponent of the Lollards. He was instrumental in the usurpation of Richard by his cousin Henry Bolingbroke, who became Henry IV.

== Life ==
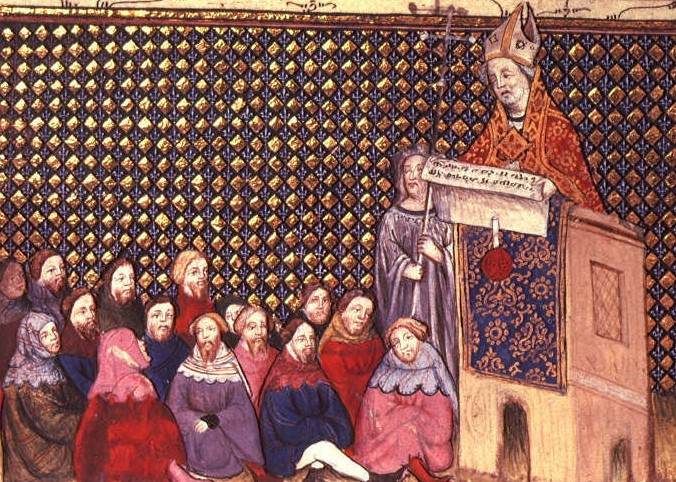
Arundel preaching (MS Harley 1319, f. 12r)

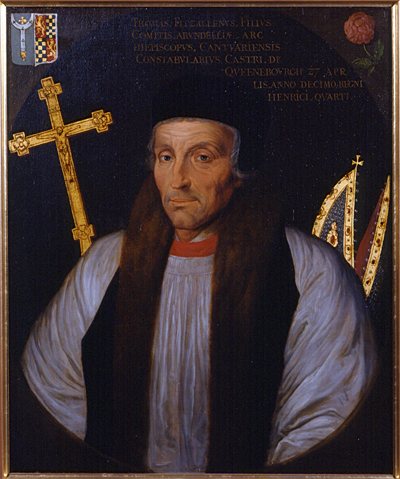
Thomas Arundel served twice as Lord Chancellor (1399 and 1407 to 1410) under Henry IV

=== Early life and career ===
Arundel was born, probably in Etchingham, Sussex, England, a younger son of Richard Fitzalan, 3rd Earl of Arundel and Eleanor of Lancaster. His elder brothers were Richard Fitzalan, 4th Earl of Arundel, who was executed for his opposition to Richard II, and John FitzAlan, 1st Baron Arundel, who drowned at sea in an expedition to aid the Duke of Brittany.

Arundel studied at Oriel College, Oxford, until papally provided as Bishop of Ely on 13 August 1373 entirely by reason of his father's status and financial leverage with the Crown during the dotage of Edward III, and happily abandoning his student days at Oxford, from which he gained little pleasure. A hugely wealthy near-sinecure, Ely seems to have captured the young bishop's genuine interest until his brother Richard's political opposition to Richard II's policies both at home and towards France grew rancorous and dragged him in. In an extremely grave crisis, teetering towards civil war during the years from 1386 through 1388, the bishop found himself, at least in formal terms, right at the front of the dangerous attempts by five leading temporal Lords Appellant to purge the king's advisors and control future policy.

On 3 April 1388, Arundel was elevated to the position of Archbishop of York at a time when Richard II was, in effect, suspended from rule. Given Ely's wealth and ease, this promotion was clearly as much to do with status and consolidating the conspirators' control in the north as with remuneration.

Arundel served twice as Lord Chancellor during the reign of King Richard II, first from 1386 to 1389, and again from 1391 to 1396. Throughout his life Arundel was more trustful than was good for him, as shown by the king's ability, after working his way astutely back into real authority, to assure Arundel of his confidence right until the "counter-coup" of 1397, when the archbishop was deceived into bringing his brother Richard out of hiding under a royal safe conduct—to his death.

Despite his political preoccupations, which certainly led to him being largely absent from York, he has been credited with sponsoring a lively revival of personal religious piety in the northern province. Besides, as was to prove the case at Canterbury too, he was also a very good spotter of administrative talent.

=== Archbishop of Canterbury ===
Stained glass window depicting Thomas Arundel as Archbishop of Canterbury at Saint Mary's Guildhall in Coventry

On 25 September 1396, Arundel was made Archbishop of Canterbury. The king's nomination seemed to wish him nothing but success. Yet, within a year, he was exiled by the king during Richard's fierce counter-attack against his enemies of ten years earlier, and was replaced by Roger Walden.

Arundel spent his exile in Florence, where in 1398, at Richard II's request, the Roman Pope Boniface IX translated him to become Bishop of St. Andrews, a cruel, empty fate because Scotland during the Western Schism recognised the pope in Avignon, already had a bishop in place and would probably never have accepted him anyway, even in peaceful times.

However, shortly afterwards, he joined up with his fellow exile Henry Bolingbroke. They invaded England together and forced Richard to yield the crown to Henry. Arundel played a prominent part in the usurpation and may have been the most hawkishly determined of all that the king should be removed entirely: whether he actually lied under oath to Richard II to lure him out of Conwy Castle remains open to debate. The new regime secured the reversal of several of Richard's acts, including the pope's installation of Walden at Canterbury. Arundel returned to his primacy, while Walden—with the support of Arundel—was eventually translated to the important see of London.

As Henry IV collapsed into ill health from 1405, Arundel returned to the forefront of government. At one point, he even took the sick king into Lambeth Palace itself for care.

In 1405–06 he had to deal with the crisis with the papacy provoked by the king's decision to execute the archbishop of York, Richard Scrope, who had participated in the Percy rebellion. Formally, under Henry IV, Arundel served twice as Lord Chancellor, first in 1399 and again from 1407 to 1410. Following the accession of Henry V, Arundel's influence at court decreased.

=== Lollardy ===
Arundel was a vehement opponent of the Lollards, the followers of John Wycliffe, who in his 1379 treatise De Eucharistia had opposed the dogma of Transubstantiation and whose theology of dominium denied the legitimacy of any secular and clerical authorities concluded to be in mortal sin.

King Henry IV passed the De heretico comburendo statute in 1401, which recited in its preamble that it was directed against a certain new sect "who thought damnably of the sacraments and usurped the office of preaching." It empowered the bishops to arrest, imprison, and examine offenders and to hand over to the secular authorities such as had relapsed or refused to abjure. The condemned were to be burnt "in a high place" before the people.

This act was probably pushed through by the authoritative Arundel. Its passing was immediately followed by the burning of William Sawtrey, curate of St Margaret's, Lynn. He had previously abjured but had relapsed, and he now refused to declare his belief in transubstantiation or to recognise the authority of the Church.

In 1407, Arundel presided at a synod at Oxford, which drew up a set of regulations known as Arundel's Constitutions. They set out regulations on preaching, the translation and use of the Scriptures, and the theological education at schools and the university. In 1410, a body of Oxford censors condemned 267 propositions collected out of Wycliffe's writings. These different measures seem to have been successful at least as far as the clergy were concerned, and Lollardy came to be more and more a lay movement, often connected with political discontent.

The death penalty was seldom carried out. Until 1410, no further Lollards were executed. The 1414 Oldcastle Revolt saw a minority of the seventy or so who were hanged also burned. Thereafter, executions were again few until the Tudor period.

Arundel had a stroke which left him unable to speak shortly afterwards. Henry V (his sister Joan's grandson), who had had uneasy relations with Arundel, installed Henry Chichele in his place.

=== Death and burial ===
Arundel died on 19 February 1414, and was buried in Canterbury Cathedral. It has been suggested that the tomb originally designated for him during his lifetime had been given up to King Henry IV of England in the previous year, and that his own tomb was hastily built and was destroyed during the 17th century. Its remnants were discovered under the nave during archaeological excavations in the 1990s.

== Legacy ==
In 2005/2006, BBC History Magazine chose Thomas Arundel as the 15th century's entry for their Ten Worst Britons poll, in which he tied in ninth place with Hugh le Despenser. In his 2004 book Who Killed Chaucer?, Terry Jones argued that Arundel was responsible for the death of Geoffrey Chaucer. Arundel appears as the antagonist in the 2014 Doctor Who audio drama The Doctor's Tale played by John Banks.

== Citations ==
Political offices
Preceded by The Earl of Suffolk	Lord Chancellor; 1386–1389	Succeeded by William of Wykeham
Preceded by William of Wykeham	Lord Chancellor; 1391–1396	Succeeded by Edmund Stafford
Preceded by Edmund Stafford	Lord Chancellor; 1399	Succeeded by John Scarle
Preceded by Thomas Langley	Lord Chancellor; 1407–1410	Succeeded by Sir Thomas Beaufort
Preceded by Sir Thomas Beaufort	Lord Chancellor; 1412–1413	Succeeded by Henry Beaufort
Catholic Church titles
Preceded by John Barnet	Bishop of Ely; 1373–1388	Succeeded by John Fordham
Preceded by Alexander Neville	Archbishop of York; 1388–1397	Succeeded by Robert Waldby
Preceded by William Courtenay	Archbishop of Canterbury; 1397–1398	Succeeded by Roger Walden
Preceded by Alexander Neville	Anti-Bishop of St Andrews; 1398–1399	Succeeded by John Trevaur
Preceded by Roger Walden	Archbishop of Canterbury; 1399–1414	Succeeded by Henry Chichele
