= John of Thoresby =

English archbishop and politician (died 1373)

- Cardinal and Archbishop of York
- Installed: 8 September 1354
- Term ended: 6 November 1373
- Predecessor: William Zouche
- Successor: Alexander Neville
- Other posts: Bishop of St Davids; Bishop of Worcester

Orders
- Consecration: 23 September 1347
- Created cardinal: 17 September 1361

Personal details
- Born: Thoresby, Wensleydale, Yorkshire, England
- Died: 6 November 1373 Cawood Castle, Cawood, Yorkshire, England
- Denomination: Roman Catholic Church

John of Thoresby (died 6 November 1373) was an English clergyman and politician, who was Bishop of St David's, then Bishop of Worcester and finally Archbishop of York. He was Lord Chancellor of England under King Edward III starting from 1349.

== Life ==
John is said to have been the son of Hugh of Thoresby, Lord of the Manor of the hamlet of Thoresby, Wensleydale, Yorkshire, England, but it is more likely that he was born in Lincolnshire.

John was, for a while, the King's proctor in the Court of Rome. In 1341, he became Master of the Rolls, an office he held till 1346. In 1345 he was given custody of the privy seal, becoming Lord Privy Seal, and held that office until 1347. Pope Clement VI appointed him Bishop of St. David's on 23 May 1347, and he was consecrated on 23 September 1347. In the same year, Thoresby was in attendance on the king at Calais with ninety-nine persons in his retinue.

John became Lord Chancellor of England in 1349, and was translated from St. David's to Worcester on 4 September 1349.

John's election as Archbishop of York was unanimous and approved by both King Edward III and Clement VI, the latter of whom appointed him on 16 August 1352 as of his own right, refusing to recognise the election of the Chapter.

In 1355, John was a Warden of the Cinque Ports and a regent of the kingdom during Edward III's absence. He resigned the Great Seal in 1356 and thereafter devoted himself to the care of the northern province.

York was not, at this time, in a satisfactory condition. The highest offices in York Minster had been, since the commencement of the fourteenth century, in the hands of the Roman Cardinals, who were, of course, non-resident. The deanery was held by them between 1343 and 1385. Order and discipline were consequently lacking both in the church and the rest of the diocese. He was created cardinal priest of S. Sabina in the consistory of 17 September 1361.

John set himself to remedy these problems as best he might. He had drawn up, in the form of a catechism, a brief statement of what he deemed to be necessary for salvation, comprising the articles of belief, the Ten Commandments, the Seven Sacraments, the Seven Deeds of Bodily and Ghostly Mercy, the Seven Virtues and the Seven Deadly Sins. The catechism was drawn up in Latin, for use of the clergy, and in rude English verse, translated from the Latin by John of Tavistock, a Benedictine of St. Mary's Abbey, York. Both Latin and English versions were issued from Cawood Palace in November 1373.

The great differences between the sees of York and Canterbury were settled during John's time as archbishop. It was arranged that each primate should carry his cross erect in the province of the other; but, as an acknowledgement of this concession, Thoresby, within the space of two months, and each of his successors within the same period after his election, was to send a knight or a doctor of laws to offer in his name, at the shrine of St. Thomas of Canterbury, an image of gold to the value of £40, in the fashion of an archbishop holding a cross or some other jewel. It was at this time also, that Pope Innocent VI made, in Fuller's words, "a new distinction – primate of All England, and Primate of England: giving the former to Canterbury and the latter to York. Thus, when two children cry for the same apple, the indulgent father divides it betwixt them. Yet so that he giveth the bigger and better part to the childe that is his darling."

The archbishop undertook much building work at York Minster. In 1360 he contributed £1810 sterling towards building a new choir. He was buried before the altar of the Virgin in the Lady Chapel, the "novum opus chori" which he had constructed. During Thoresby's archiepiscopate, Walter Skirlaugh, afterwards Bishop of Durham, was his private chaplain and William of Wykeham was a prebendary of York. It is possible that both Skirlaugh and Wykeham, widely seen as two of the greatest builders of the age, may have been greatly influenced by the works undertaken in the Minster by Archbishop Thoresby.

John died at Cawood, Yorkshire, on 6 November 1373.

== Citations ==
Political offices
Preceded by Thomas Hatfield	Lord Privy Seal; 1345–1347	Succeeded by Simon Islip
Preceded by John de Ufford	Lord Chancellor; 1349–1356	Succeeded by William Edington
Catholic Church titles
Preceded by Henry Gower	Bishop of St. David's; 1347–1349	Succeeded by Reginald Brian
Preceded by Wulstan Bransford	Bishop of Worcester; 1349–1353	Succeeded by Reginald Brian
Preceded by William Zouche	Archbishop of York; 1353–1373	Succeeded by Alexander Neville
