= John Barnet =

14th-century Bishop of Worcester, Bath and Wells, and Ely

- Bishop of Ely
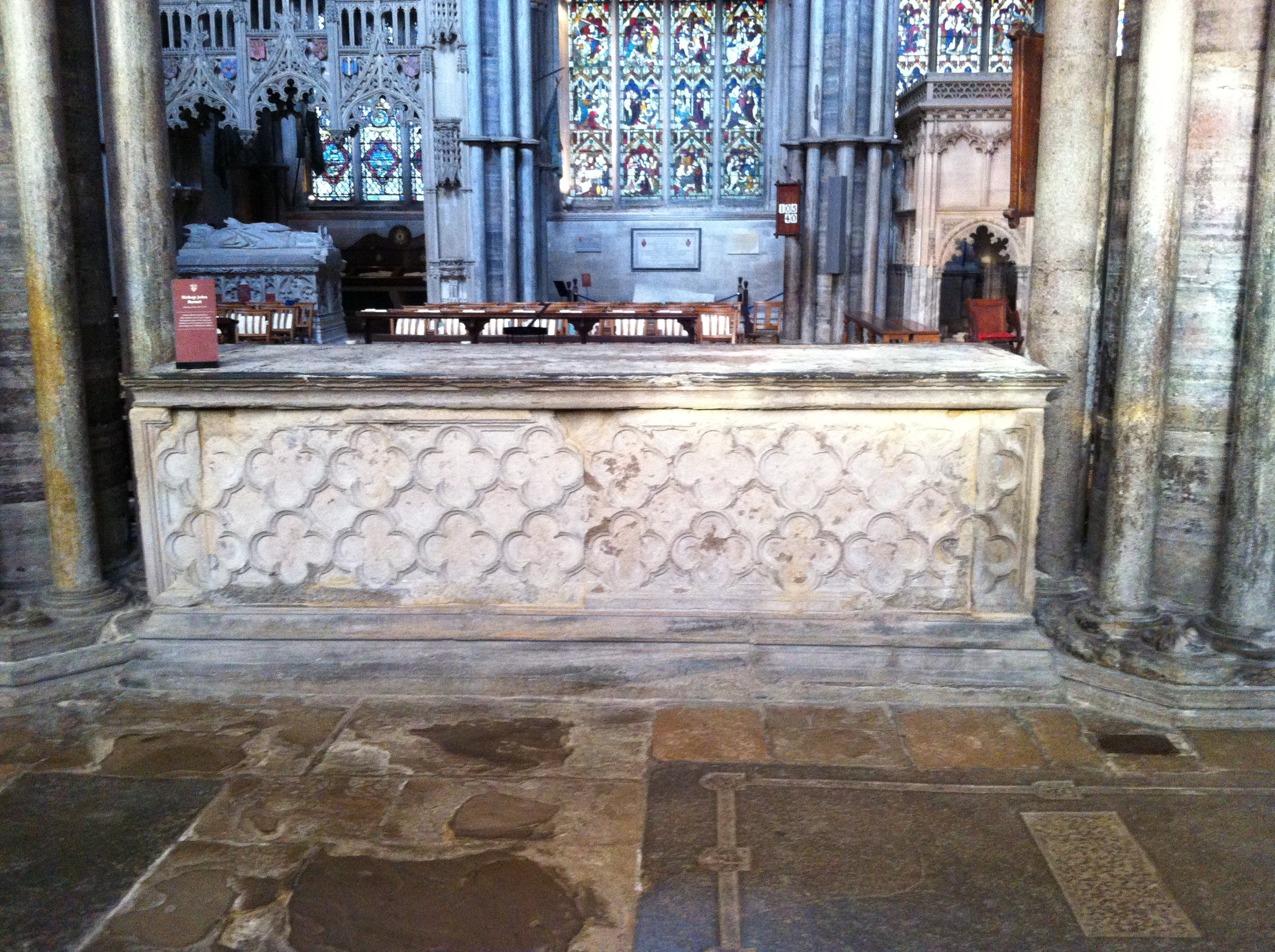
- Memorial to Bishop John Barnet in Ely Cathedral
- Appointed: 15 December 1366
- Term ended: 8 June 1373
- Predecessor: Simon Langham
- Successor: Thomas Arundel
- Previous posts: Bishop of Worcester; Bishop of Bath and Wells

Orders
- Consecration: 20 March 1362

Personal details
- Died: 8 June 1373
- Denomination: Catholic

John Barnet (died 1373) was a Bishop of Worcester then Bishop of Bath and Wells then finally Bishop of Ely.

Barnet was selected Bishop of Worcester about 16 December 1361, and consecrated on 20 March 1362. He was translated to the see of Bath about 28 November 1363.

Barnet was selected as Lord High Treasurer in February 1363 and held the office until June 1369.

Barnet was translated to the see of Ely on 15 December 1366. He died as Bishop of Ely on 8 June 1373.

== Citations ==
Political offices
Preceded by Simon Langham	Lord High Treasurer; 1363–1369	Succeeded by Thomas Brantingham
Catholic Church titles
Preceded by Reginald Brian	Bishop of Worcester; 1361–1363	Succeeded by William Wittlesey
Preceded by Ralph of Shrewsbury	Bishop of Bath and Wells; 1363–1366	Succeeded by John Harewell
Preceded by Simon Langham	Bishop of Ely; 1366–1373	Succeeded by Thomas Arundel
