= Thomas Fastolf =

English lawyer

Doctor Thomas Fastolf
- Bishop of St David's
- Province: Canterbury
- Diocese: St David's
- Installed: 1352
- Term ended: June 1361
- Predecessor: Reginald Brian
- Successor: Adam Houghton

Orders
- Ordination: unknown
- Consecration: 1352

Personal details
- Born: Perhaps at Great Yarmouth, date unknown.
- Died: June 1361 St David's
- Denomination: Roman Catholic
- Education: Probably Cambridge

Thomas Fastolf, sometimes spelt Fastolfe (died June 1361), was an English canon lawyer and Bishop of St David's from 1352 until his death.

Probably educated at Cambridge and then overseas, he held the degree of Doctor of Laws and his first career was as a canon lawyer in Avignon, which was then the seat of the Papacy. He is credited as the first identifiable reporter of cases in the papal court known as the Rota. As Fastolf advanced in the service of the Avignon popes, he gained a series of preferments in the British Isles, concluding with the bishopric of St David's.

== Early life ==
Fastolf was one of three sons of Thomas Fastolf, of Great Yarmouth, Norfolk, who all became lawyers. His brothers were Nicholas (died 1330), ancestor of Sir John Fastolf, generally believed to have inspired Shakespeare's character of Sir John Falstaff, and Lawrence. His mentor was William Bateman, bishop of Norwich, and he was probably an undergraduate at the University of Cambridge, as others were who came under Bateman's protection, but his studies were continued overseas, and it is not known where he took his degree of Doctor of Laws. His brother Nicholas became a serjeant-at-law and Lord Chief Justice of Ireland, while his brother Lawrence was auditor of the audience court of Canterbury.

== Career ==
By 1326, Fastolf was a clerk of Cardinal Giovanni Gaetano Orsini (d. 1335), and by about 1335 he was a papal judge at Avignon, with a seat in the rota. He became an auditor of the apostolic palace before 1340, probably during the life of his patron Bateman, who had great influence at the Avignon curia. In 1340 he and Robert de Tresk were appointed the proctors at Avignon of John de Stratford, Archbishop of Canterbury.

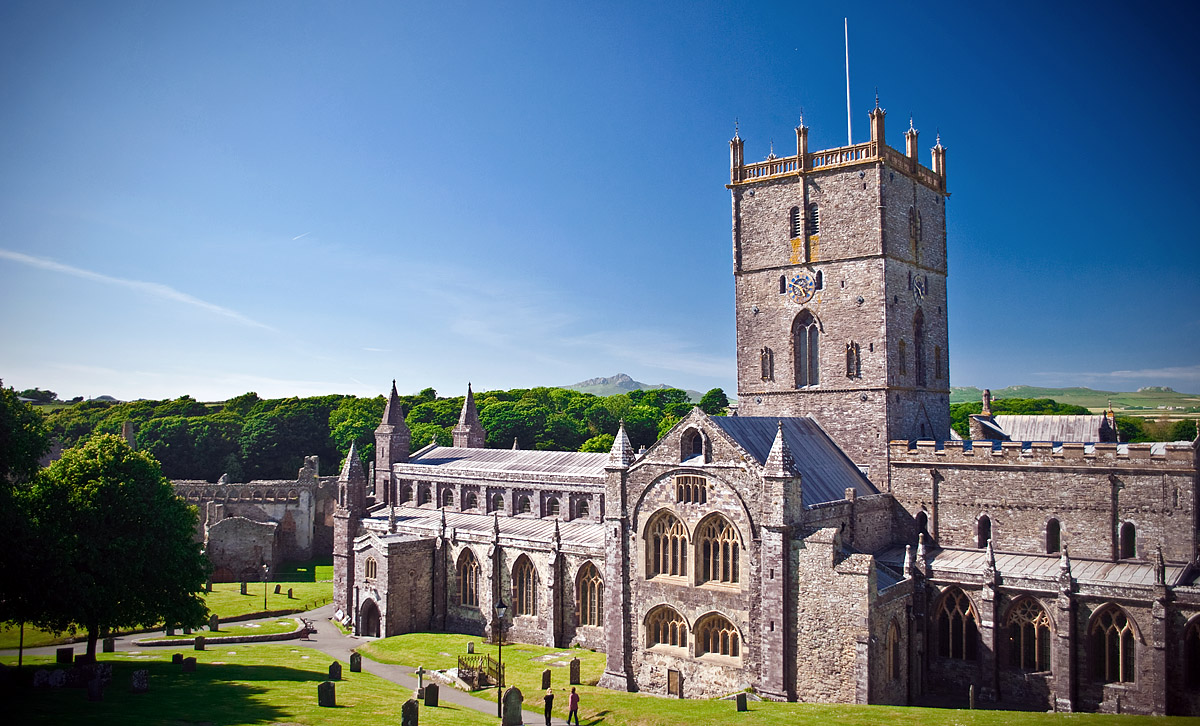
St David's Cathedral

Fastolf gained various preferments at home as rewards for his services. In 1326 he was appointed prebendary of York and archdeacon of Coventry and later gained several other prebends. From 1340 to 1347 he was archdeacon of Norwich, and from 1347 to 1352 archdeacon of Wells.

Although common lawyers had begun reporting cases in England during the 1260s, Fastolf is credited as the first who can be identified as reporting cases in the Rota. In the tradition of common law, Fastolf wrote a series of reports on thirty-six cases heard at the Rota in Avignon between December 1336 and February 1337, constituting a journal of the debates among the first-grade auditors over some two and a half months, the Decisiones rotae. This work by Fastolf was published in Rome in 1475 under the name of Thomas Falstoli, providing a model for the reporting of secular cases in Italy and France, so that reports of cases became a feature of the European jus commune until the time of Napoleon.

In 1352 Fastolf's services in Avignon were rewarded with the bishopric of St David's. He resigned his seat in the rota, the English presence there being continued by Simon Sudbury. He received the spiritualities of St David's on 29 March 1353 and the temporalities of the diocese on 4 June.

As Bishop of St David's for nine years, Fastolf appears to have presided over a period of quiet order, with no major new projects undertaken. A historian of the bishop's palace at St David's writes:

Of Bishop Thomas Fastolf, who held the See from 1353 to 1361, practically nothing is known. There is no reason to suppose that any important work was initiated during this period, though it is possible that buildings begun by Gower, may have been completed under his successors.

In 1358, Fastolf made a statute, later confirmed by Richard II, to make it easier and safer for the prebendaries of his diocese to collect their share of the tithes.

Fastolf made a will on 9 June 1361 and died before the end of June. As he had requested in his Will, which was proved on 1 July 1361, his body was entombed "at the right hand of the image of the Blessed Mary, in her Chapel", in St David's Cathedral. He left all his possessions to be disposed of by David Ley, precentor of St David's, Robert of Grymeston of the church of Dyserth, and Phillip Dyer, rector of Llanychllwydog. No books are mentioned.

== Notes ==
Religious titles
Preceded by Reginald Brian	Bishop of St David's; 1352–1361	Succeeded by Adam Houghton
