= Alexander Neville (bishop) =

Archbishop of York from 1374 to 1388

- Archbishop of York
- Elected: November 1373
- Installed: 18 December 1374
- Term ended: 30 April 1388
- Predecessor: John of Thoresby
- Successor: Thomas Arundel
- Other post: Bishop of St Andrews (Roman candidate) 1388–1392

Orders
- Consecration: 4 June 1374

Personal details
- Born: c. 1340
- Died: May 1392 (aged approximately 52) Leuven
- Buried: Church of the Carmelites, Leuven
- Denomination: Roman Catholic Church
- Parents: Ralph Neville, 2nd Baron Neville de Raby and Alice de Audley

Alexander Neville (c. 1340–1392) was a late medieval prelate who served as Archbishop of York from 1374 to 1388.

== Life ==
Born around 1340, Alexander Neville was a younger son of Ralph Neville, 2nd Baron Neville de Raby and Alice de Audley. He was a member of the Neville family, one of the most powerful families in the north of England.

Neville's first known ecclesiastical appointment was as a canon of York Minster, holding the prebendary of Bole from 1361 to 1373. He became a claimant to the Archdeaconry of Cornwall from 1361 until it was set aside in 1371, becoming instead Archdeacon of Durham from circa 1371 to 1373. He was appointed Archbishop of York on 3 or 14 April 1374, having been elected by the chapter of York in November 1373 and received royal assent on 1 January 1374. He was consecrated to the episcopate at Westminster on 4 June 1374 and enthroned at York Minster on 18 December 1374.

On the Lords Appellant rising against King Richard II in 1386, however, Neville was accused of treason and it was determined to imprison him for life in Rochester Castle.

Neville fled, and Pope Urban VI, pitying his case, translated him to the Scottish see of St. Andrews on 30 April 1388. However, he never took possession of the see because the Scots acknowledged the Avignon papacy with their own candidate, Walter Trail.

For the remainder of Neville's life he served as a parish priest in Leuven, where he died in May 1392 and was buried there in the Church of the Carmelites.

== Citations ==
Catholic Church titles
Preceded by John of Thoresby	Archbishop of York; 1374–1388	Succeeded by Thomas Arundel
