= Simon Langham =

Archbishop of Canterbury from 1366 to 1368

Simon Langham O.S.B.
- Cardinal, Archbishop of Canterbury; Primate of All England
- Church: Catholic Church
- Appointed: 24 July 1366
- Installed: unknown
- Term ended: 28 November 1368
- Predecessor: William Edington
- Successor: William Whittlesey
- Other posts: Cardinal-Bishop of Sabina; Bishop of Ely

Orders
- Consecration: 20 March 1362 by William Edington
- Created cardinal: 22 September 1368 by Pope Urban V
- Rank: Cardinal-Bishop

Personal details
- Born: 1310 Langham, Rutland, England
- Died: 22 July 1376 (aged 65–66) Avignon, France
- Buried: Westminster Abbey

Simon Langham (1310 – 22 July 1376) was an English clergyman who was Archbishop of Canterbury and a cardinal.

== Life ==
Langham was born at Langham in Rutland. The manor of Langham was a property of Westminster Abbey, and he had become a monk in the Benedictine Abbey of St Peter at Westminster by 1346, and later prior and then abbot of this house. He was the son of Thomas Langham who was buried in the abbey.

=== Treasurer of England ===
In November 1360, Langham was made Treasurer of England and on 10 January 1362 he became Bishop of Ely and was consecrated on 20 March 1362. During his time as Bishop of Ely he was a major benefactor of Peterhouse, Cambridge, giving them the rectory of Cherry Hinton. He resigned the treasurership before 20 February 1363, and was appointed Chancellor of England on 21 February 1363.

=== Archbishop of Canterbury ===
He was chosen Archbishop of Canterbury on 24 July 1366.

Perhaps the most interesting incident in Langham's primacy was when he drove the secular clergy from Canterbury College, Oxford and filled their places with monks or friars in 1366. The expelled head of the seculars was a certain John de Wiclif, who has been identified with the reformer John Wycliffe. In 1371 Wycliffe's appeal to Rome was decided and was unfavourable to him. The incident was typical of the ongoing rivalry between monks and secular clergy at Oxford University at this time.

Notwithstanding the part Langham as Chancellor had taken in the anti-papal measures of 1365 and 1366, he was made cardinal of San Sisto Vecchio by Pope Urban V in 1368. This lost him the favour of Edward III; two months later, he resigned his archbishopric and went to Avignon. He had already resigned the chancellorship on 18 July 1367. He was soon allowed to hold other although less exalted positions in England.

== Death ==
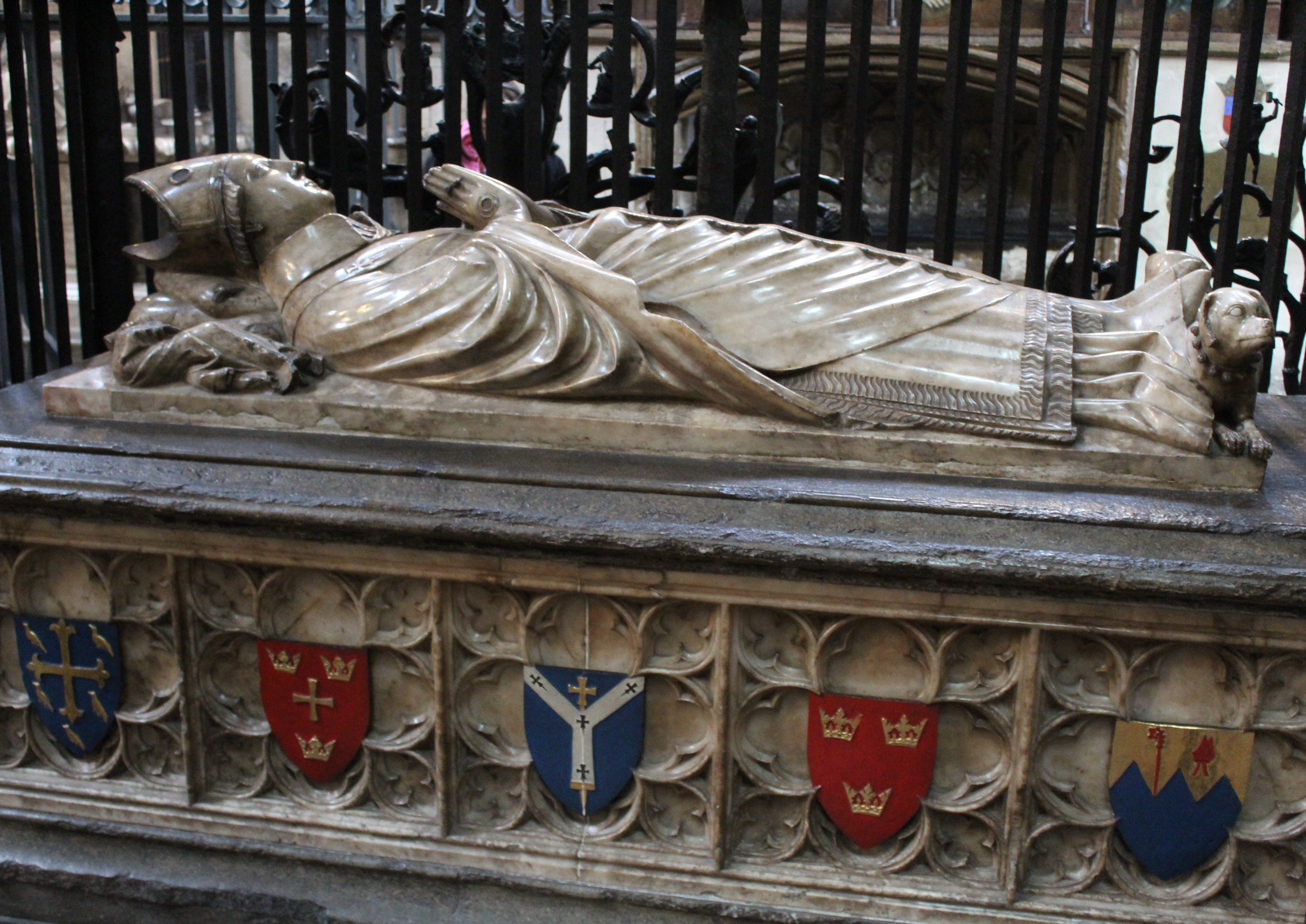
Tomb of Simon Langham in Westminster Abbey

In 1374, he was elected Archbishop of Canterbury for the second time, but he withdrew his claim and died at Avignon on 22 July 1376. He was buried in Avignon but his body was moved to Westminster Abbey in 1379. Langham's tomb, in the chapel of St Benedict, is the work of Henry Yevele and Stephen Lote, and dates from 1389-1395. It is the oldest monument to an ecclesiastic in the Abbey.

Langham left the residue of his large estate and his library to Westminster Abbey, and has been called its second founder. His bequest paid for the building of the western section of the nave. The books he gave are listed in The Manuscripts of Westminster Abbey (1909) by J. A. Robinson and M. R. James.

Political offices
| Preceded by John Sheppey | Lord High Treasurer; 1360–1363 | Succeeded by John Barnet |
| Preceded by William Edington | Lord Chancellor; 1363–1367 | Succeeded by William of Wykeham |
Catholic Church titles
| Preceded by Thomas de Lisle | Bishop of Ely; 1362–1366 | Succeeded by John Barnet |
| Preceded by William Edington | Archbishop of Canterbury; 1366–1368 | Succeeded by William Whittlesey |
