= Reginald Brian =

14th-century Bishop of Worcester and Bishop of St David's

- Bishop of Worcester
- Appointed: 22 October 1352
- Term ended: 10 December 1361
- Predecessor: John de Thoresby
- Successor: John Barnet
- Previous post: Bishop of St David's

Orders
- Consecration: 26 September 1350

Personal details
- Died: 10 December 1361
- Denomination: Catholic

Reginald Brian was a medieval Bishop of St David's and Bishop of Worcester. He was the son of Guy Bryan, 1st Baron Bryan, brother of Guy Brian the younger, and brother-in-law of Alice Brian, better known as Alice de Bryene.

Brian was consecrated Bishop of St David's on 26 September 1350 and translated to the see of Worcester on 22 October 1352.

Brian died on 10 December 1361.

== Citations ==
Catholic Church titles
Preceded by John de Thoresby	Bishop of St David's; 1350–1352	Succeeded by Thomas Fastolf
Preceded by John de Thoresby	Bishop of Worcester; 1352–1361	Succeeded by John Barnet
