= John Harewell =

14th-century Bishop of Bath and Wells

- Bishop of Bath and Wells
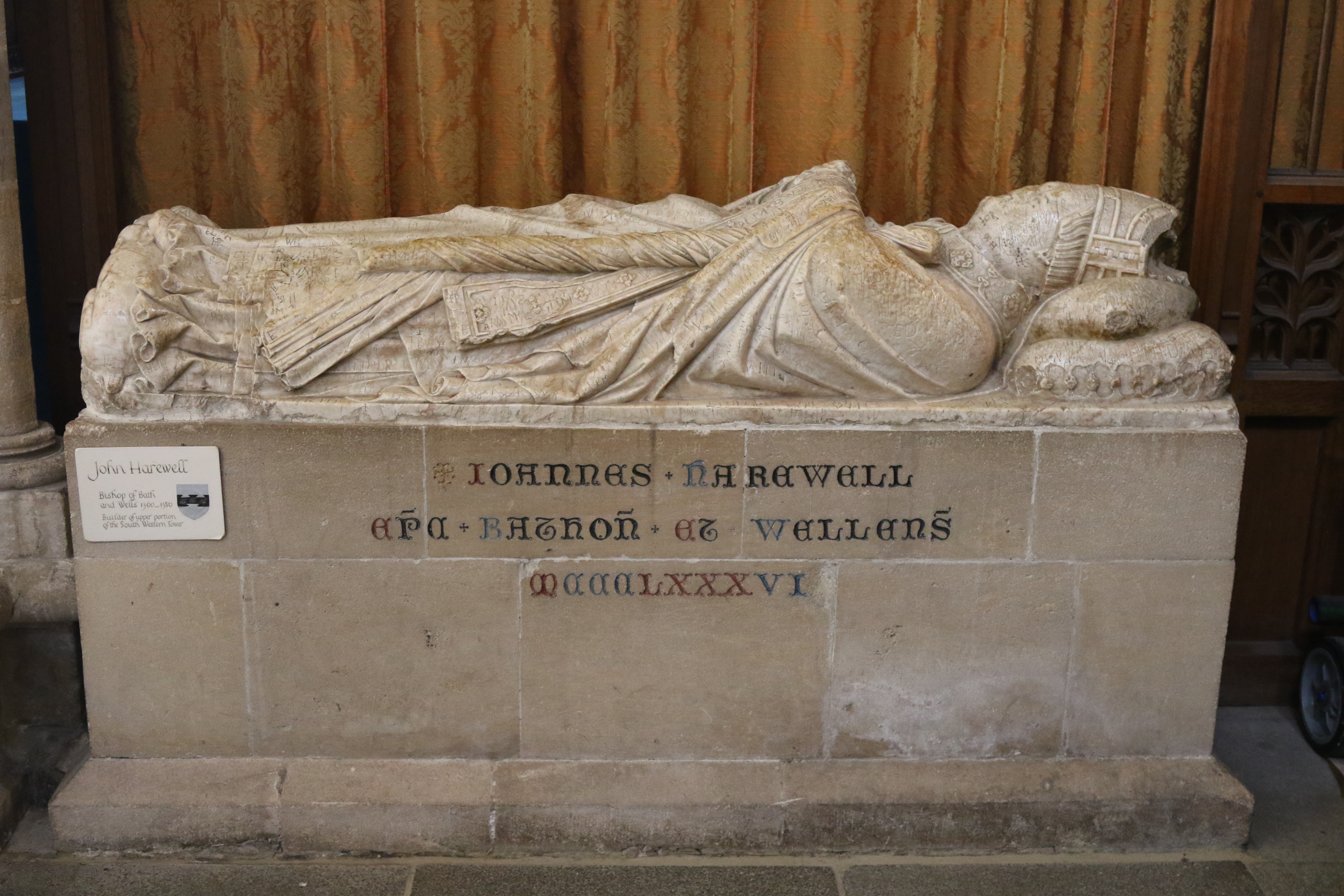
- Tomb in Wells Cathedral
- Appointed: 14 December 1366
- Term ended: c. 16 July 1386
- Predecessor: John Barnet
- Successor: Walter Skirlaw

Orders
- Consecration: 7 March 1367

Personal details
- Died: c. 16 July 1386
- Denomination: Catholic

John Harewell was a Bishop of Bath and Wells in medieval England.

Harewell came from Harwell in Berkshire (now in Oxfordshire). He was in the employ of the Black Prince. In 1353, he became the Archdeacon of Worcester before being collated Archdeacon of Berkshire in 1365 and then selected, on 14 December 1366, as Bishop of Bath and Wells. He was consecrated on 7 March 1367 and died around 16 July 1386. His executors are listed as John Harewell; John Bryngton; John Grene, of Welles, canon; John de Tuttebury, in 1399 (1 Henry IV).

== Citations ==
Catholic Church titles
Preceded by John Barnet	Bishop of Bath and Wells; 1366–1386	Succeeded by Walter Skirlaw
