= Simon Islip =

Archbishop of Canterbury from 1349 to 1366

- Archbishop of Canterbury
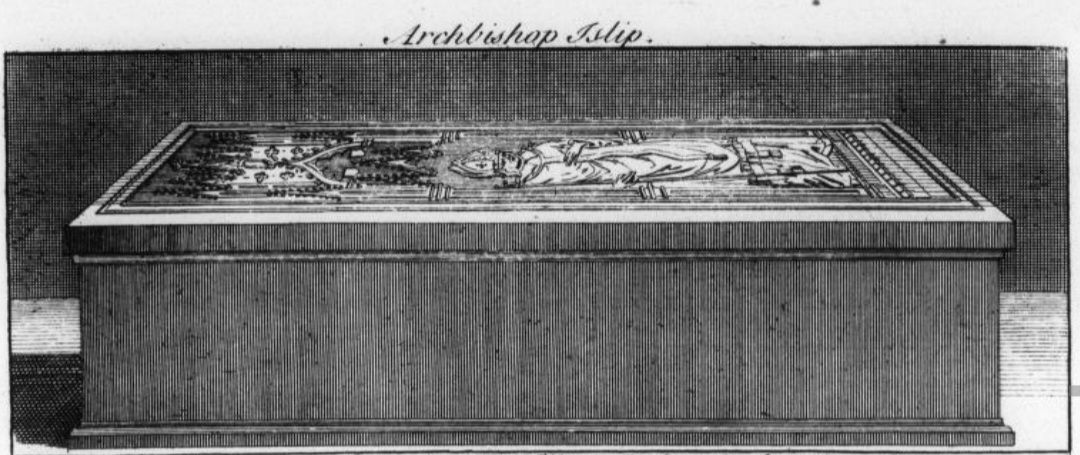
- The now lost tomb of Islip as drawn by John Dart in 1726.
- Appointed: 20 September 1349
- Installed: unknown
- Term ended: 26 April 1366
- Predecessor: Thomas Bradwardine
- Successor: William Edington

Orders
- Consecration: 20 December 1349

Personal details
- Died: 26 April 1366

Simon Islip (died 1366) was an English prelate. He served as Archbishop of Canterbury between 1349 and 1366.

== Early life ==
Islip was the uncle of William Whittlesey. He was a cousin of Walter de Islip, Chief Baron of the Irish Exchequer: both took their surname from their native village of Islip, Oxfordshire. Simon was educated at the University of Oxford where he took his doctorate in canon and civil law and became a fellow of Merton College in 1307. He was regarded as one off the outstanding ecclesiastical lawyers of his time.

== Career ==
Islip was rector of Easton, near Stamford, and of St. Mary's Church, Horncastle; he became Archdeacon of Stow in 1332. He held several prebendaries of which the most important was Prebendal of Aylesbury at Lincoln Cathedral and was Vicar-General of the Diocese of Lincoln. He became Archdeacon of Canterbury in 1343 and subsequently Dean of Arches.

== Lord Privy Seal ==
In 1347, possibly in September, Islip was appointed keeper of the Privy Seal. Previously he had held the seal of Lionel of Antwerp, the King's second son, who was the regent in England. He enjoyed the trust and confidence of Edward III, who relied on him in political and diplomatic as well as Church affairs, and gave him extensive powers during his absence in France. Though loyal to the King he did not hesitate to oppose him where the affairs of the Church were concerned, and later addressed a famous remonstrance, the Speculum Regis Edwardi, refusing the King's demand for a tenth of ecclesiastical income for six years. He vacated the office between 21 February and 1 May 1350.

== Archbishop of Canterbury ==
Islip was elected to the see of Canterbury on 20 September 1349, following the death in quick succession of his three predecessors from the Black Death; provided to the see on 7 October 1349, and entrusted with the temporalities of the diocese on 15 November 1349. His consecration took place on 20 December 1349.

As archbishop during the first two outbreaks of the Death, Islip took great pains to regulate clerical stipends, as the greatly reduced number of clerics had led them to charge increased fees for their services. He believed that the times required strict economy, and this combined with a naturally frugal character, gained him a reputation for meanness. He succeeded in settling a long dispute with the Archbishop of York as to the latter's right to carry his episcopal cross in the province of Canterbury.

== Death and afterward ==
Islip died on 26 April 1366 at Mayfield, Sussex, having for three years been unable to exercise his office due to a stroke which deprived him of the power of speech. He left generous endowments to the monks of Canterbury. He also left money for the establishment of a new college at Oxford, but it did not flourish and was finally absorbed by Cardinal Wolsey into Christ Church, Oxford.

== Citations ==
Political offices
Preceded by John Thoresby	Lord Privy Seal; 1347–1350	Succeeded by Michael Northburgh
Catholic Church titles
Preceded by Thomas Bradwardine	Archbishop of Canterbury; 1349–1366	Succeeded by William Edington
