= William Edington =

English bishop of Winchester and administrator (died 1366)

- Bishop of Winchester
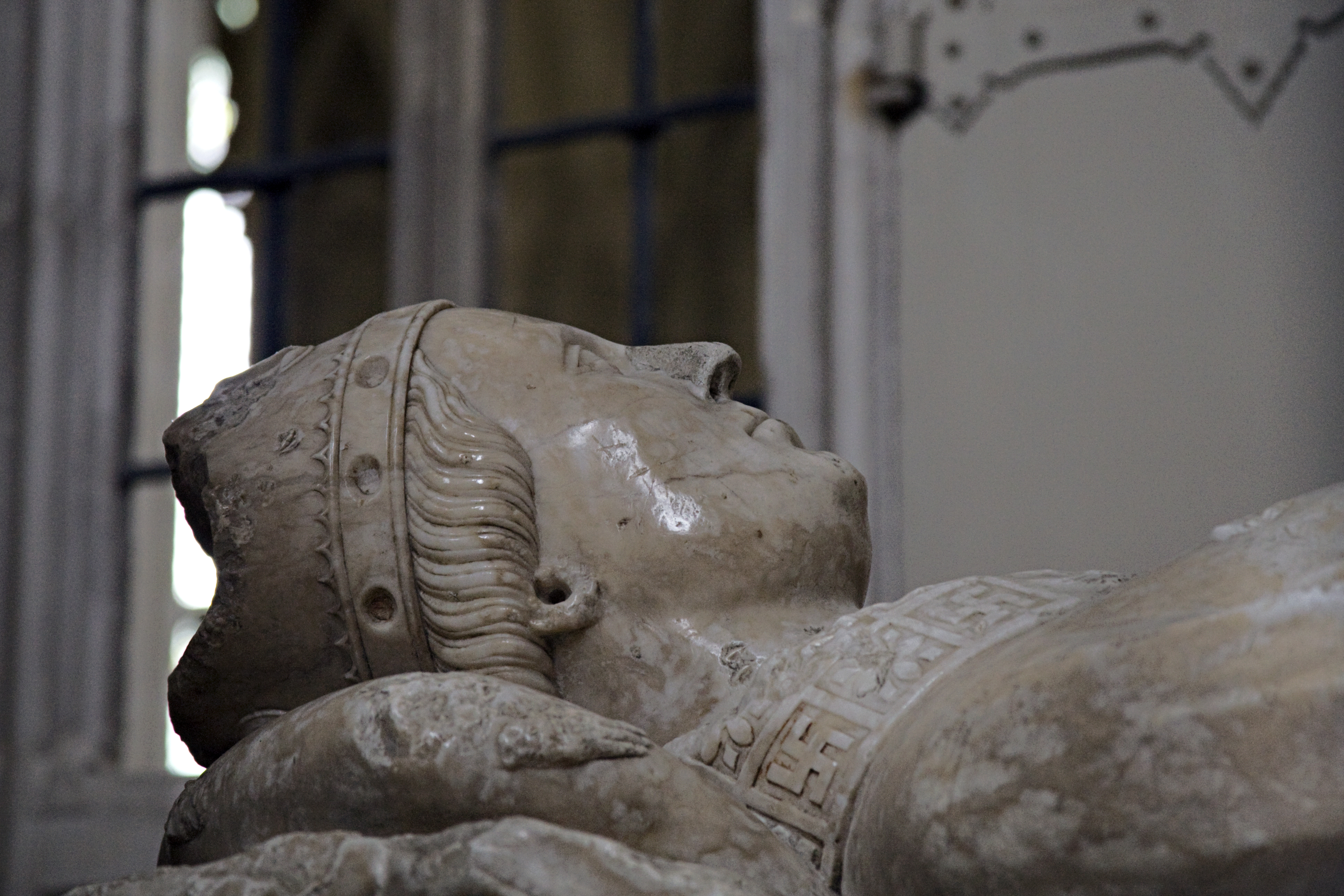
- Effigy of William Edington in Winchester Cathedral.
- Church: Catholic Church
- Province: Canterbury
- Appointed: 9 December 1345
- Term ended: 6 or 7 October 1366
- Predecessor: Adam Orleton
- Successor: William of Wykeham
- Other posts: Lord High Treasurer; Lord Chancellor; Archbishop-elect of Canterbury
- Previous post: Keeper of the wardrobe

Orders
- Consecration: 14 May 1346

Personal details
- Died: 6 or 7 October 1366 Bishop's Waltham
- Buried: Winchester Cathedral

William Edington (died 6 or 7 October 1366) was an English bishop and administrator. He served as Bishop of Winchester from 1346 until his death, Keeper of the wardrobe from 1341 to 1344, treasurer from 1344 to 1356, and finally as chancellor from 1356 until he retired from royal administration in 1363. Edington's reforms of the administration – in particular of royal finances – had wide-ranging consequences and contributed to the English military efficiency in the early stages of the Hundred Years' War. As Bishop of Winchester, he was responsible for starting an extensive rebuilding of Winchester Cathedral, and for founding Edington Priory, the church of which still stands today.

== Royal service ==
Edington's parents were Roger and Amice of Edington near Westbury, Wiltshire. Though it has been claimed that he was educated at Oxford, there seems to be no support for this. His first patron, however, was the Oxford chancellor Gilbert Middleton, who was also a royal counsellor. When Middleton died in 1331, Edington entered the service of Middleton's friend, Adam Orleton, Bishop of Winchester. Through Orleton, Edington's abilities were brought to the attention of King Edward III, and in 1341 the King named him keeper of the wardrobe. The position was an important one; the wardrobe functioned as the treasury while the King was on campaign, and Edward strongly resisted any attempts to limit this royal prerogative.

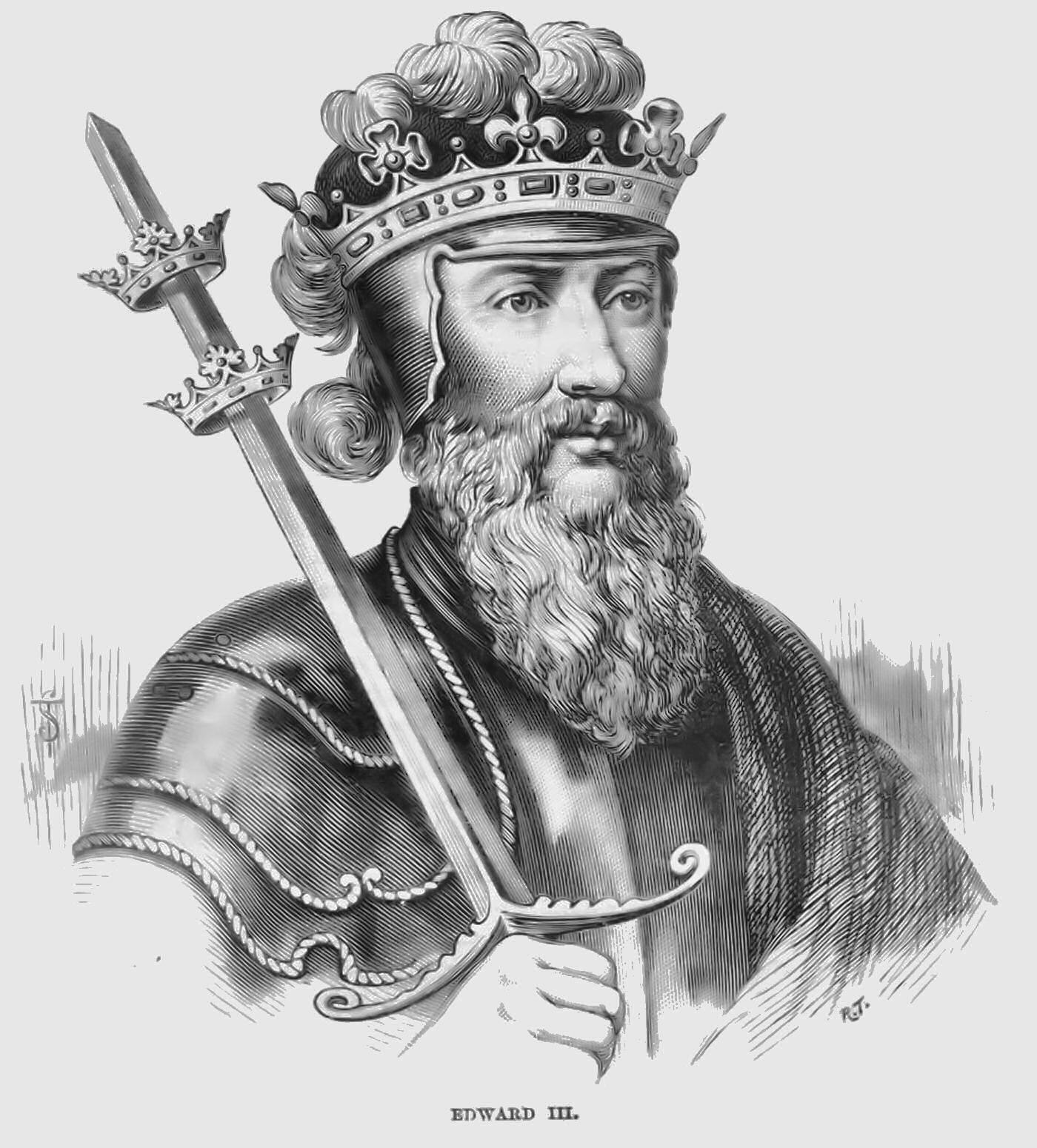
Edward III in Cassell's History of England (1902)

The King must have been impressed by Edington's performance, because in 1344 he made him treasurer of the realm, a position he held for the exceptionally long period of twelve years. This was a job fraught with problems, as the nation was in serious financial difficulties by the mid-1340s. The treasury was in great debt from the heavy demands of the early stages of the Hundred Years' War. By then reneging on his debts, the king had lost public confidence, and struggled to obtain new loans. Edington saw the need to bring all royal expenditure under the oversight of the exchequer. This did not entail controlling the King's use of his resources – a move Edward would have resented greatly – but simply attempting to budget all revenues and expenses. By the early 1360s, this was largely achieved; a testimony to the capabilities and energy of Edington as an administrator. In 1356, he was named chancellor, a post he held until his retirement from the national scene in 1363, possibly for health reasons.

== Ecclasiastical career ==
Edington also held ecclesiastical benefices. After his education, he held a succession of rectorates in Northamptonshire: first at Cottingham, then at Dallington, and finally from 1322 at Middleton Cheney.

In 1335 Orleton collated Edington to the rectory of Cheriton, Hampshire, and from 1335 to 1346 he was master of the Hospital of St Cross in Winchester. Also, the King was eager to reward his capable servant; in 1341 he was given the prebend of Leighton Manor (Lincoln), by 1344 he also held that of Netheravon (Salisbury), and by 1345 that of Putston (Hereford). This level of pluralism was not unusual at the time. His greatest preferment, however, came with his papal appointment – on the King's request – to the see of Winchester in 1345. This was the richest see in England, considered second only to the archbishopric of Milan.

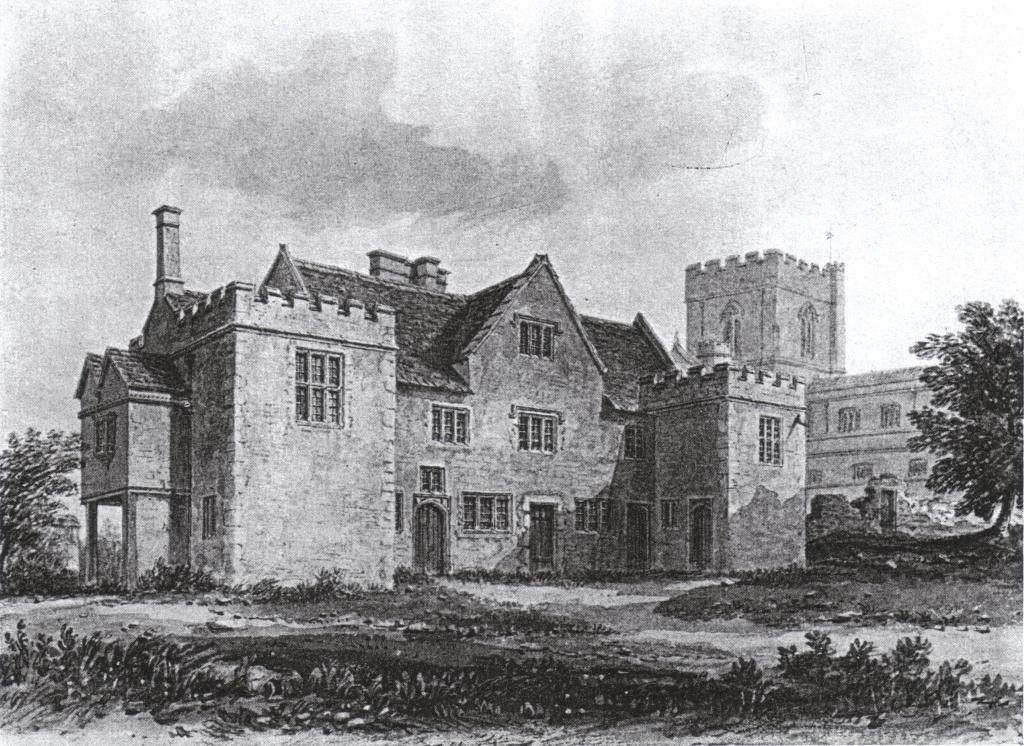
Edington Priory in 1826

The monks of Winchester had already elected one of their own number, but this was over-ruled, and Edington was consecrated in 1346. As a bishop, he was necessarily much absent, even with the relatively short distance between Westminster and Winchester. He was not entirely detached from his episcopal duties, however: he used the see as a source for extensive nepotism, yet he also initiated wide-ranging building works on the nave of the cathedral. Meanwhile, in 1351, he founded an Augustinian priory at his birthplace of Edington, to have prayers said for himself, his parents and his brother. Although most of the priory has been demolished, the church still stands, as a good example of the transition between the decorated and perpendicular style of church-building.

Edington was the first Prelate of the Order of the Garter on its foundation in 1348, and that office has ever since been held by his successors as Bishops of Winchester.

In May 1366, as a final sign of royal gratitude, King Edward had Edington elected Archbishop of Canterbury. Edington, however, declined on the grounds of failing health; or rather, he declined because, as he said, "Canterbury is the higher Rack, but Winchester is the better Manger," i.e., the former was the higher honour, but the second provided the higher income. Five months later, on 6 or 7 October 1366, he died at Bishop's Waltham. He is buried in Winchester Cathedral, where his effigy can be seen in the chantry chapel he himself had built in the nave.

== Citations ==
Political offices
| Preceded by William Cusance | Lord High Treasurer; 1344–1356 | Succeeded by John Sheppey |
| Preceded by John Thoresby | Lord Chancellor; 1356–1363 | Succeeded by Simon Langham |
Catholic Church titles
| Preceded by Adam Orleton | Bishop of Winchester; 1345–1366 | Succeeded by William of Wykeham |
| Preceded by Simon Islip (archbishop) | Archbishop-elect of Canterbury; 1366 | Succeeded by Simon Langham (archbishop) |
