= William Whittlesey =

Archbishop of Canterbury from 1368 to 1374

- Archbishop of Canterbury
- Church: Catholic Church
- Appointed: 11 October 1368
- Installed: unknown
- Term ended: 5 June 1374
- Predecessor: Simon Langham
- Successor: Simon Sudbury
- Other posts: Bishop of Rochester; Bishop of Worcester

Orders
- Consecration: 6 February 1362

Personal details
- Died: 5 June 1374 Lambeth

William Whittlesey (or Whittlesea) (died 5 June 1374) was a bishop of Rochester, then bishop of Worcester, then finally archbishop of Canterbury. He also served as master of Peterhouse, Cambridge.

== Life ==
Whittlesey was probably born in the Cambridgeshire village of Whittlesey, England.

Whittlesey was educated at Oxford, and owing principally to the fact that he was a nephew of Simon Islip, archbishop of Canterbury, he received numerous ecclesiastical preferments; he held prebends at Lichfield, Chichester and Lincoln, and livings at Ivychurch, Croydon and Cliffe.

Whittlesey was briefly appointed Master of Peterhouse on 10 September 1349 and resigned from that post in 1351. Later he was appointed vicar-general, and then dean of the court of arches by Islip. On 23 October 1360 he became Bishop of Rochester and was consecrated on 6 February 1362. Two years after his consecration he was transferred to the bishopric of Worcester on 6 March 1364. On 11 October 1368 Whittlesey was transferred to the archbishopric of Canterbury in succession to Simon Langham, but his term of office was very uneventful, a circumstance due partly, but not wholly, to his feeble health. He died at Lambeth on 5 or 6 June 1374.

== Notes ==
Catholic Church titles
Preceded by John Sheppey	Bishop of Rochester; 1360–1364	Succeeded by Thomas Trilleck
Preceded by John Barnet	Bishop of Worcester; 1364–1368	Succeeded by William Lenn
Preceded by Simon Langham	Archbishop of Canterbury; 1368–1374	Succeeded by Simon Sudbury
Academic offices
Preceded by Ralph de Holbeche	Master of Peterhouse, Cambridge; 1349–1351	Succeeded by Richard de Wisbeche
