= William Wynford =

English architect (flourished 1360–1405)

William Wynford or William of Wynford (flourished 1360–1405) was one of the most successful English master masons of the 14th century, using the new Perpendicular Gothic style.

== Life and career ==
He is first mentioned in 1360 when at work at Windsor Castle as warden of masons' work. He became master mason at Wells Cathedral on 1 February 1365 where he is believed to have designed the South West tower, it was probably here that he met William of Wykeham who was then a provost of the cathedral. He was made master of the works at Windsor Castle in 1364 under Wykeham, in 1372 Edward III granted Wynford a pension of £10 per annum.

In 1375–76 he was at work at Abingdon Abbey and working for the crown at Corfe Castle in 1377–78 making new rooms in the keep. In 1378 Wynford was working with Henry Yevele at Southampton.

With the death of Edward III the new king Richard II of England favoured Wykeham, with newfound wealth he founded in 1379 New College, Oxford, which was designed by Wynford, who also designed Winchester College founded by Wykeham in 1382.

In 1389–90 he was repairing Winchester Castle, from 1392 he designed Wardour Castle, and in the 1390s he commenced his last major work, the remodelling of the Norman nave of Winchester Cathedral in the latest Perpendicular Gothic style.

== Features of Wynford's works ==
Wynford used a distinctive plan of placing the chapel and great hall end to end; this occurred at Windsor Castle (the chapel and hall were united as a single hall by Sir Jeffry Wyatville for George IV), and at Winchester and New Colleges. The two colleges also have cloisters that are next to rather than surrounded by the main college buildings, which form a separate courtyard consisting of as well as the great hall and chapel, an entrance gate with tower above, sets of rooms for scholars and fellows opening off staircases, a library, accommodation for the Warden. The kitchen, bakery and other service buildings are in a separate wing at New College, but surround a second courtyard at Winchester College. New college also has a bell tower next to the cloister.

These were the very first educational buildings in England to be designed as a complete entity and, as such, they influenced later college buildings such as King's College, Cambridge, Eton College & Magdalen College, Oxford.

== Appearance ==
There is a portrait of Wynford in the stained glass in the east window of Winchester College; this shows an old man with thinning hair, a long nose and dropping moustache and forked beard with the words 'Willms Wynfort lathomus' below.

== Works ==
- New College, Oxford, Oxfordshire
- Old Wardour Castle, Wiltshire (probable)
- Wells Cathedral, Somerset: south-west tower
- Winchester Cathedral, Hampshire: remodelling of nave
- Winchester College, Hampshire
- Windsor Castle, Berkshire: work on royal lodgings in Upper Ward

== Gallery of architectural work ==
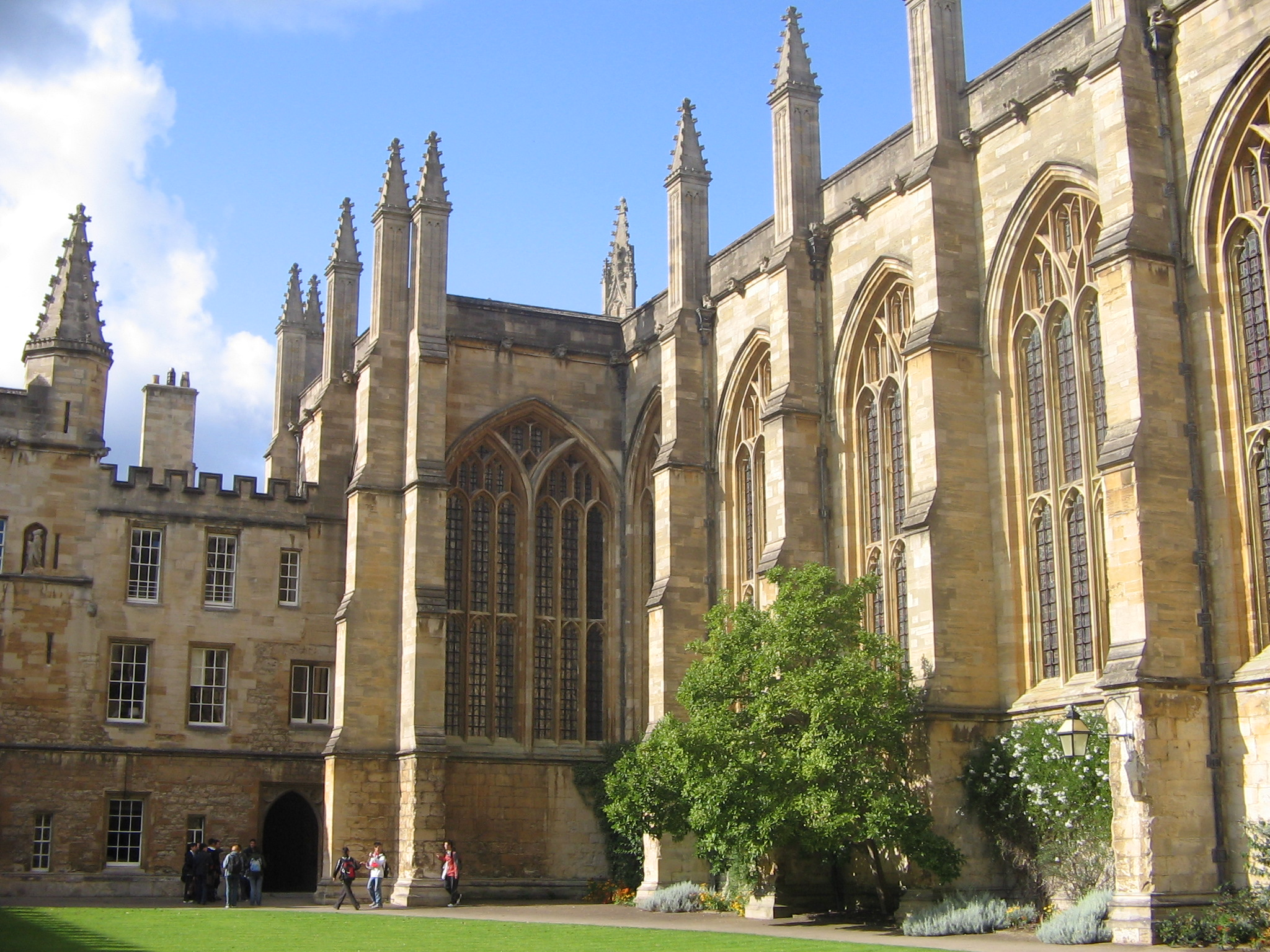
New College, Oxford, the chapel exterior looking north-west

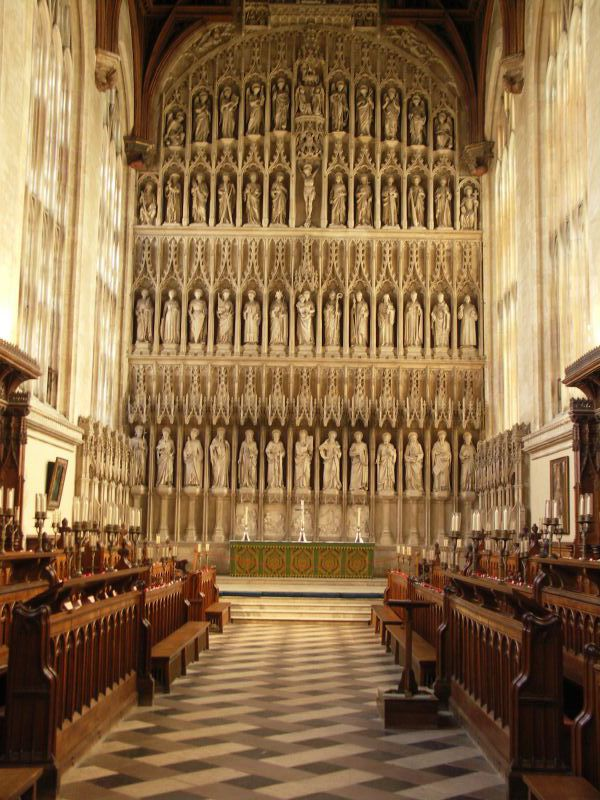
New College, Oxford, the chapel interior looking east

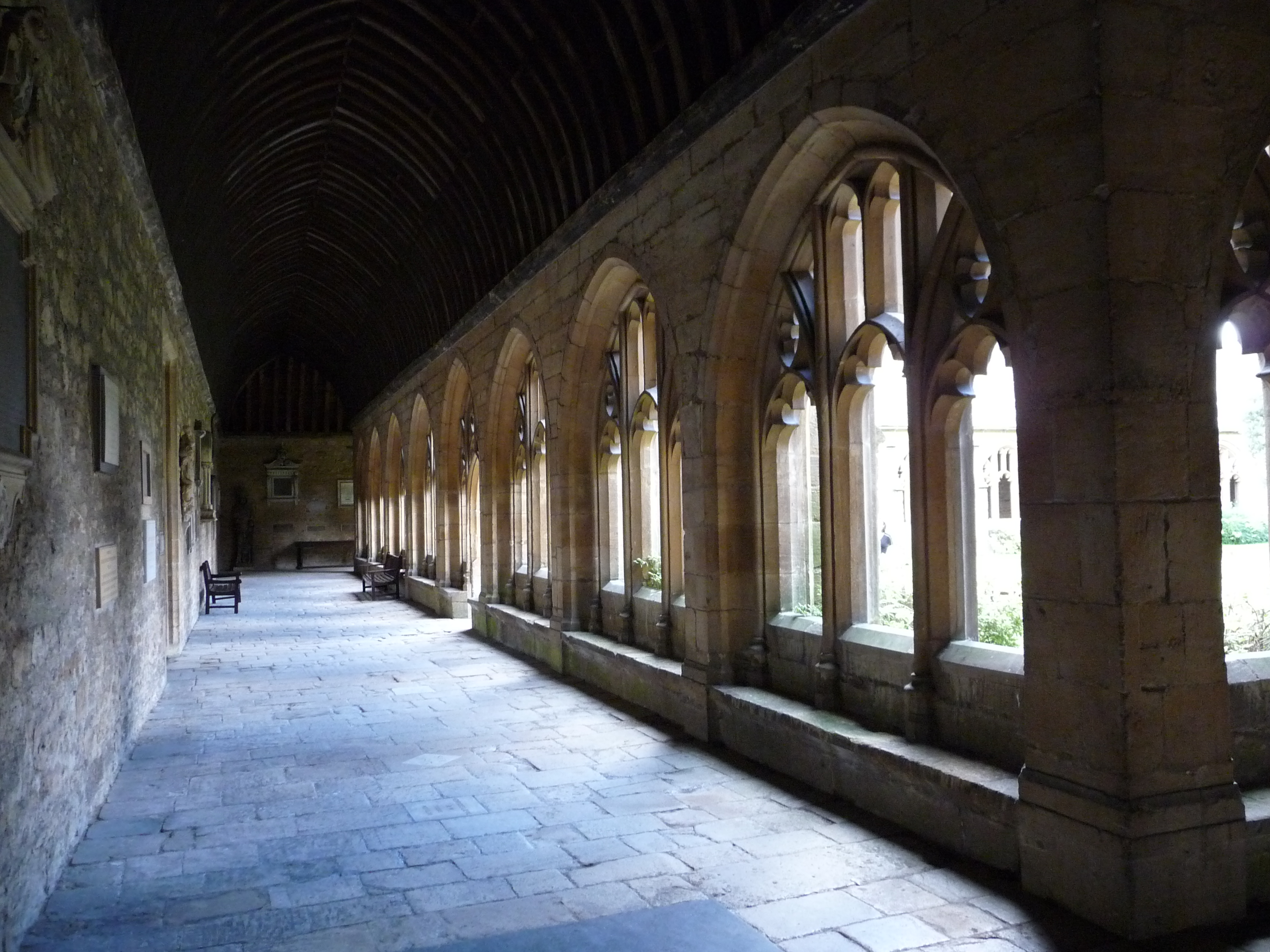
New College, Oxford, the cloisters

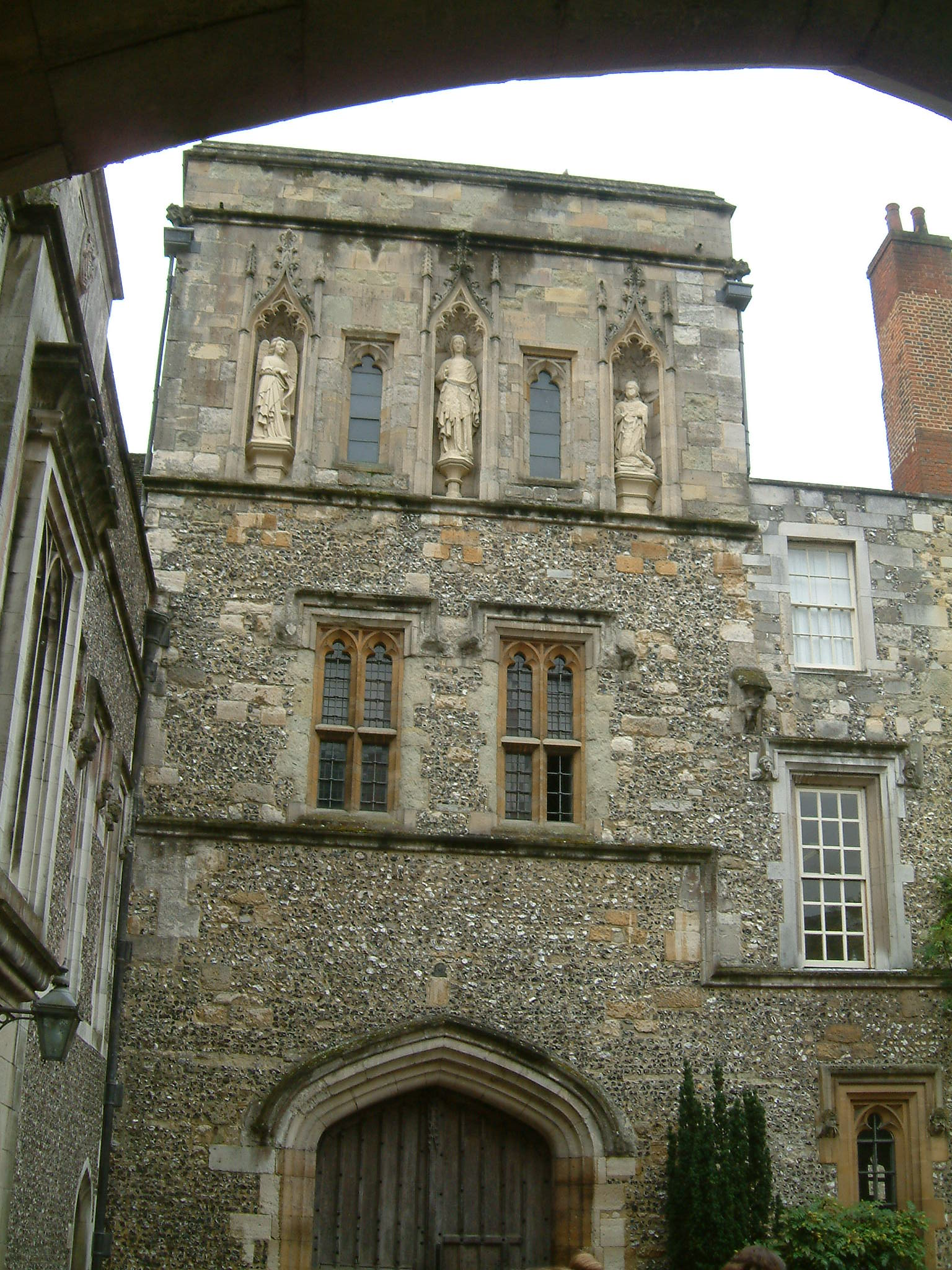
Winchester College, gateway

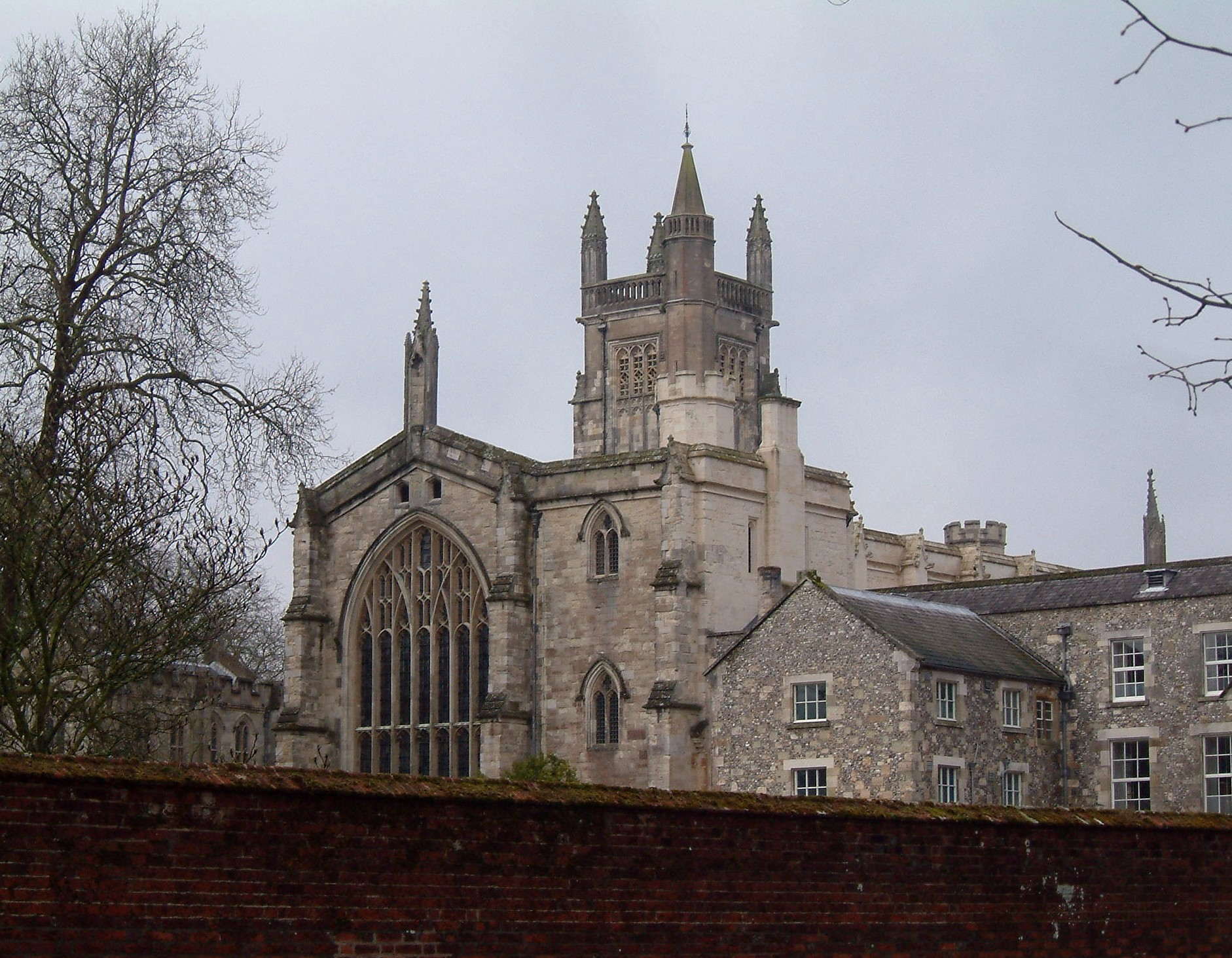
Winchester College, exterior of the chapel

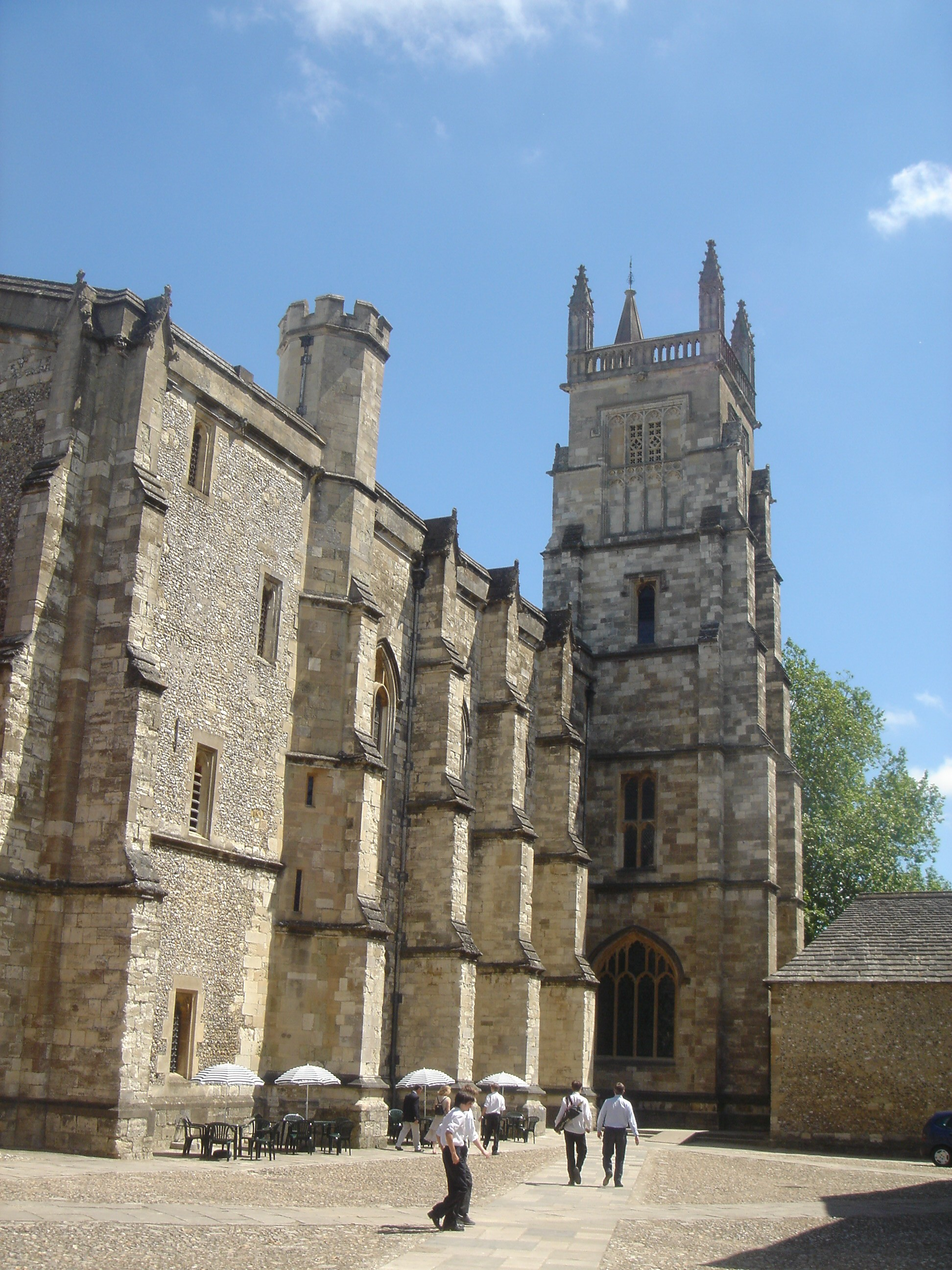
Winchester College, exterior of the chapel

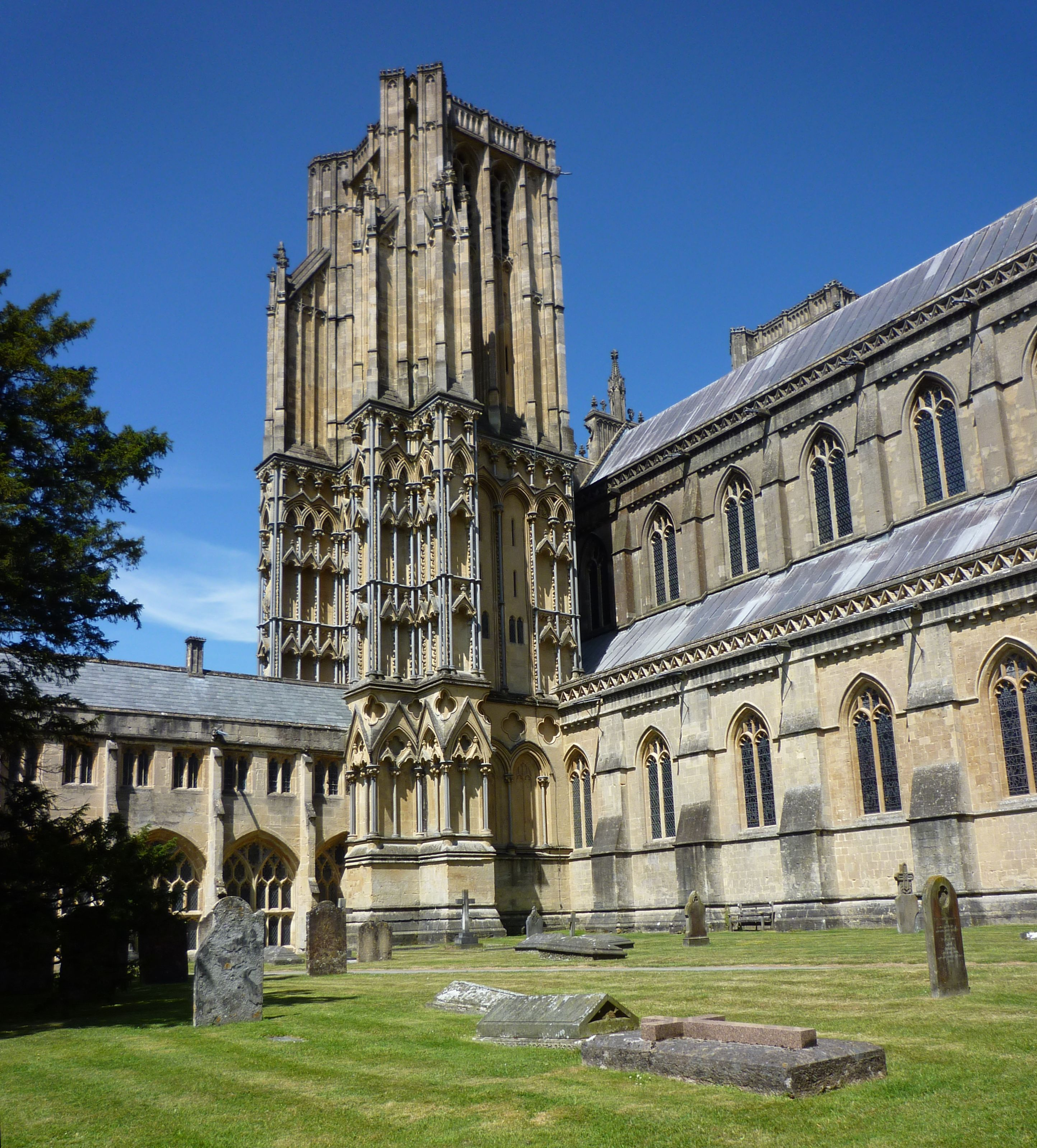
Wells Cathedral, the south-west tower

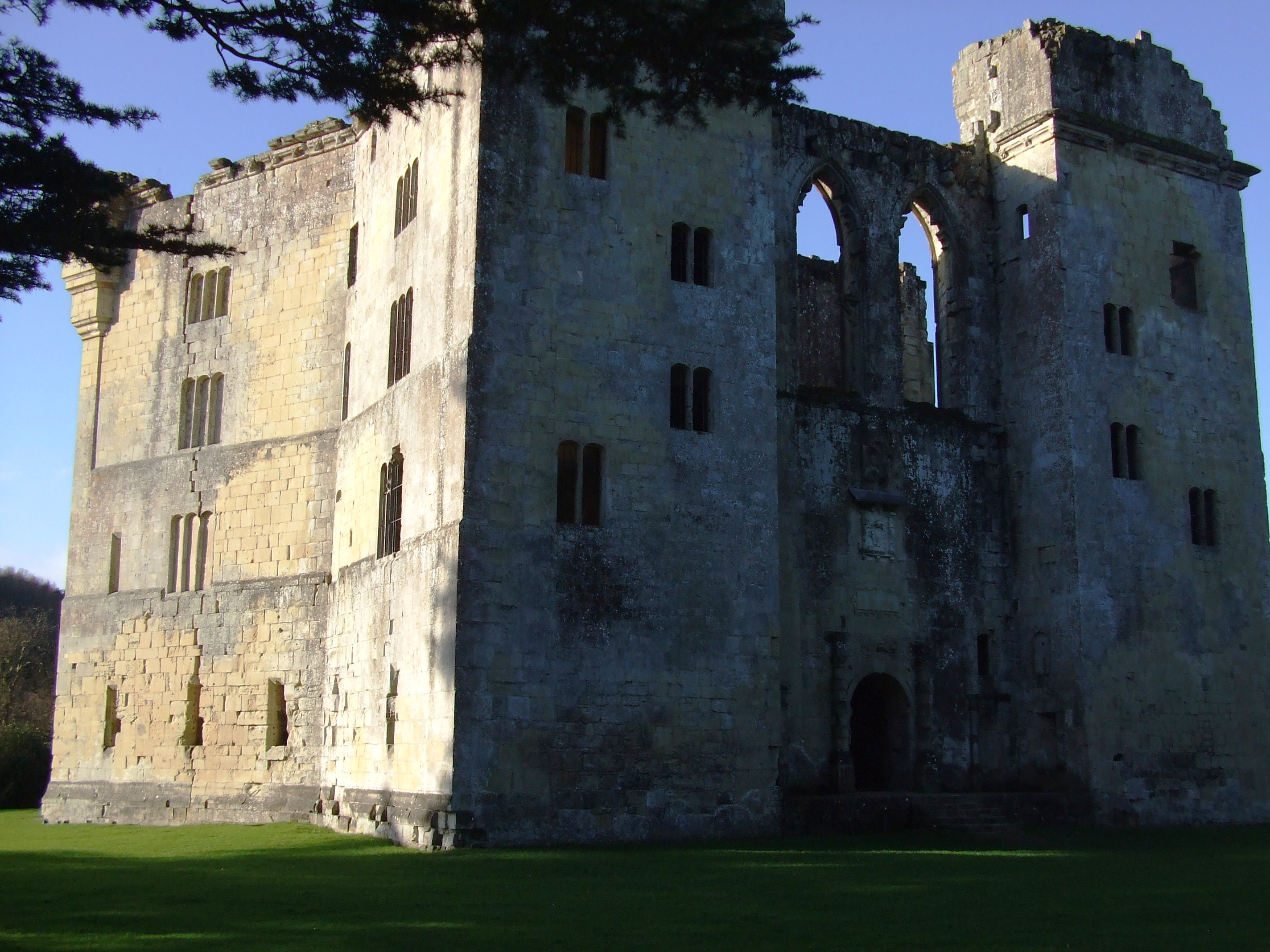
Wardour Castle

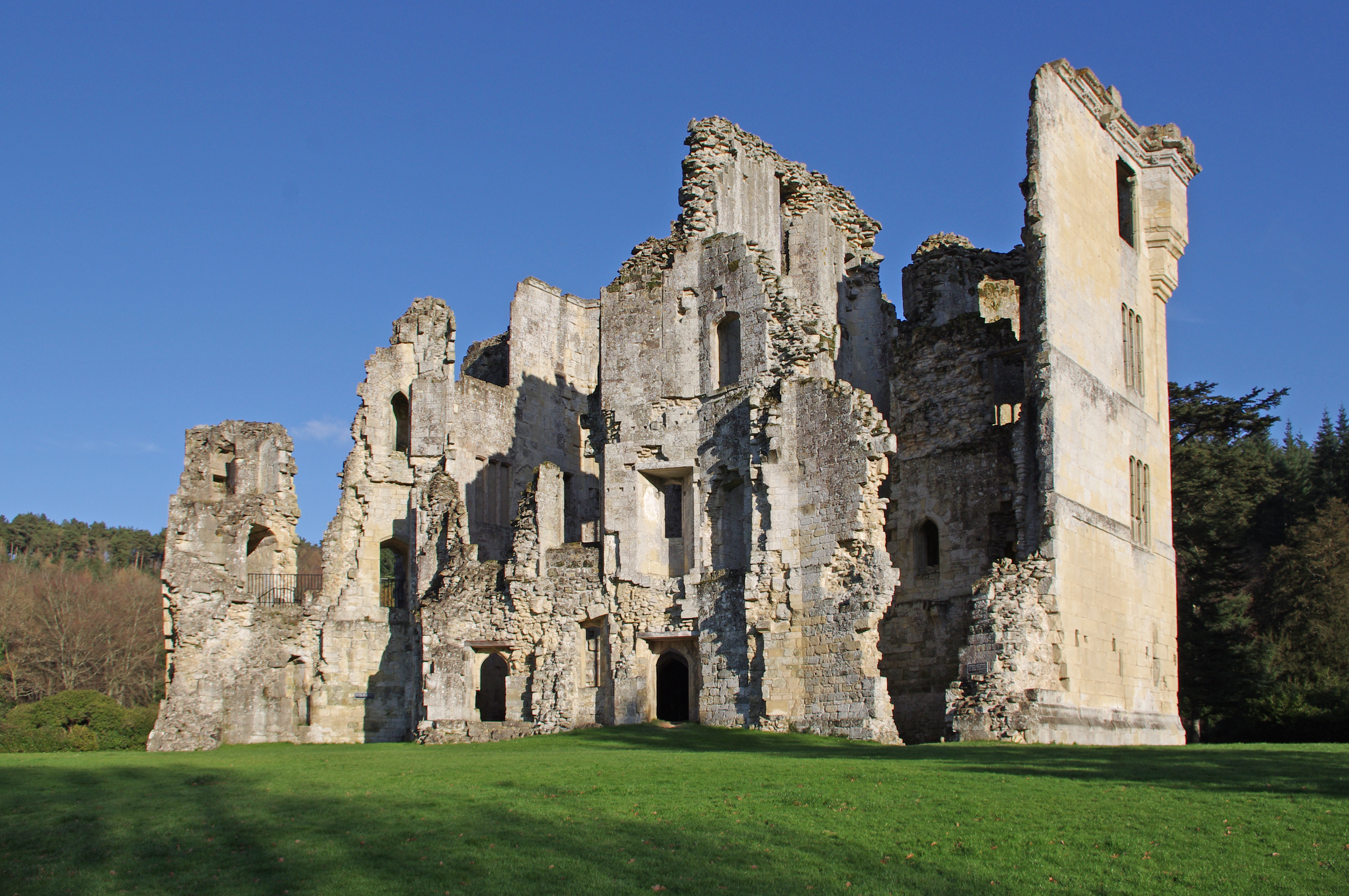
Wardour Castle

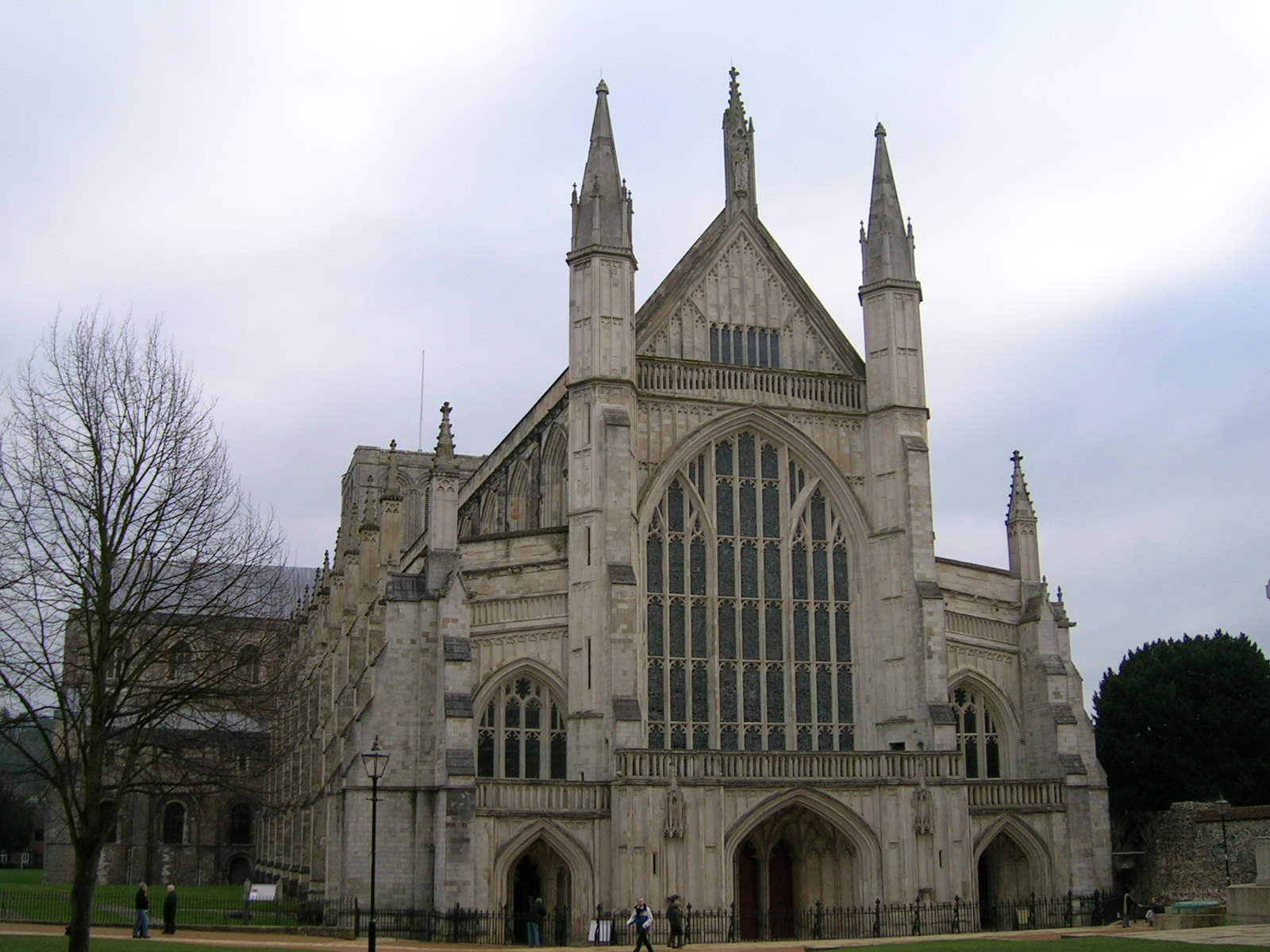
Winchester Cathedral, west front

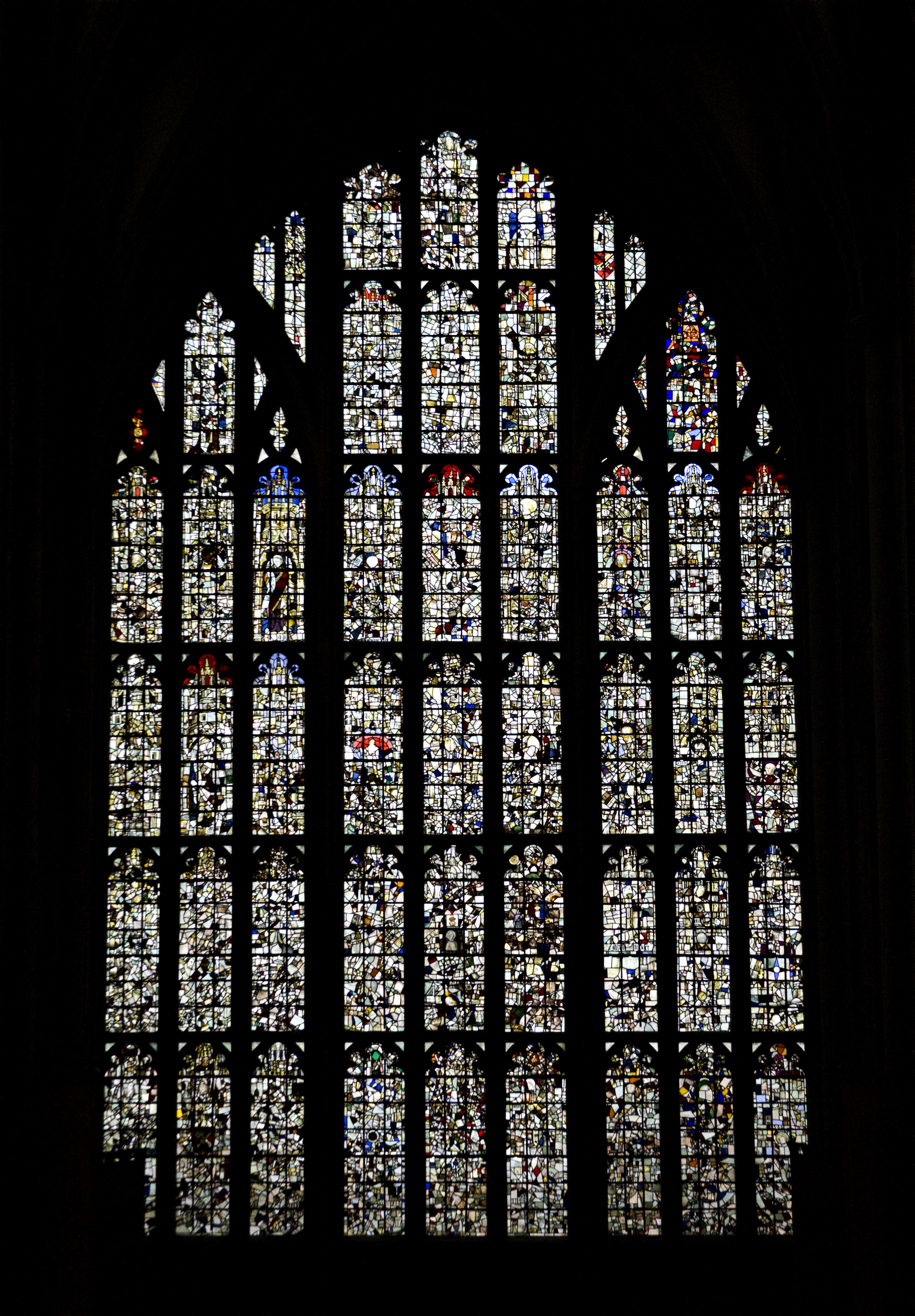
Winchester Cathedral, great west window in nave

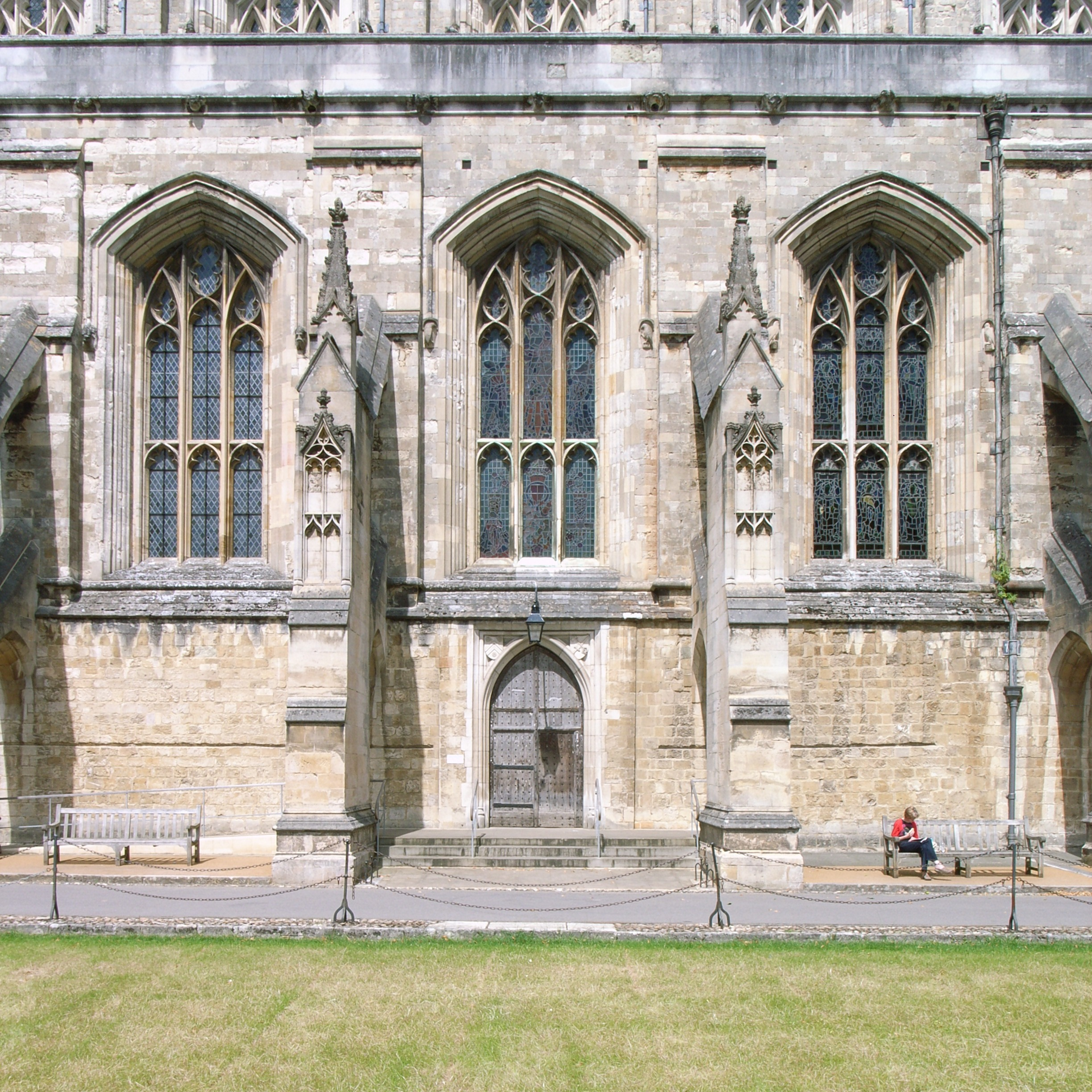
Winchester Cathedral, South nave aisle windows

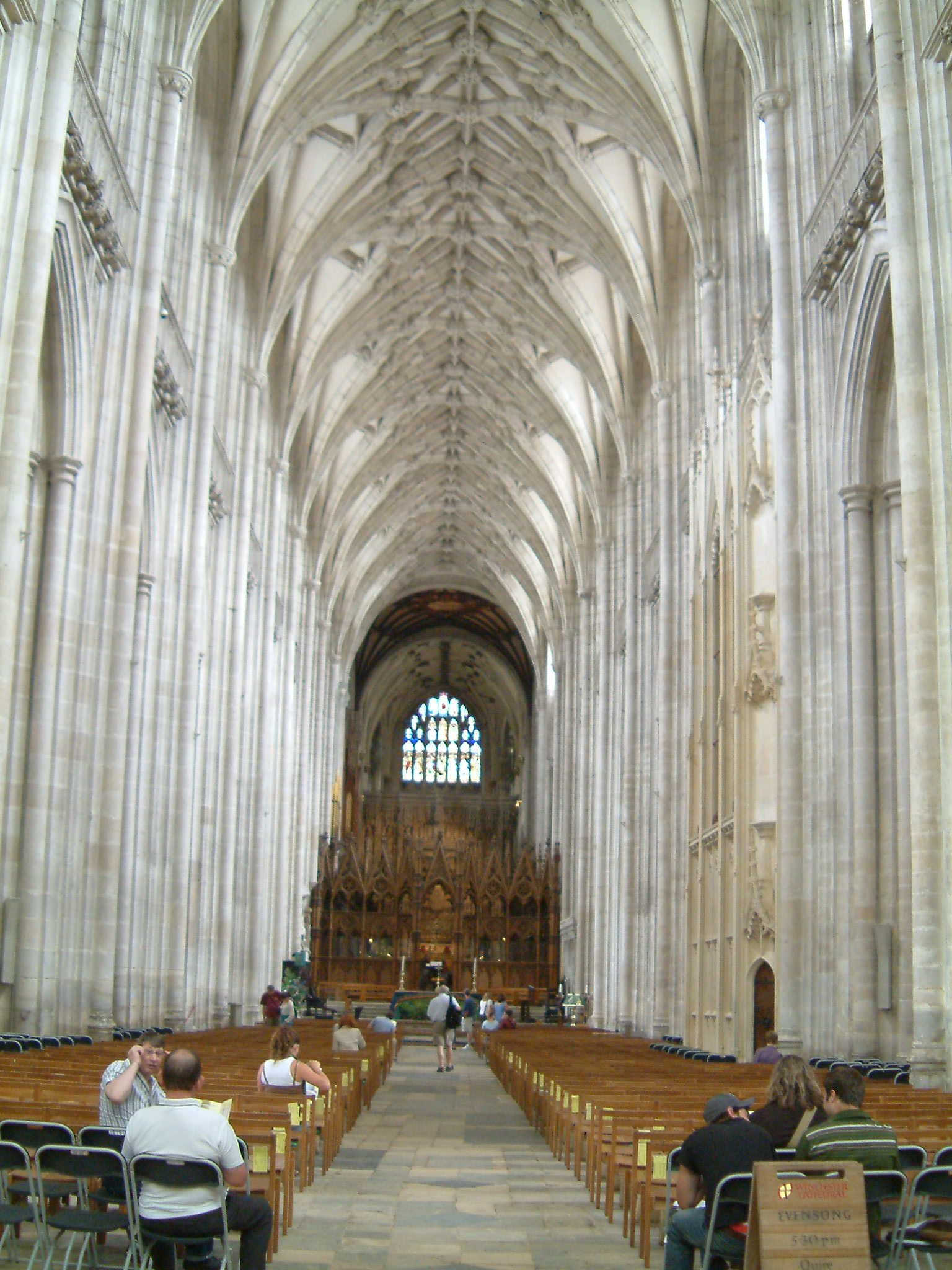
Winchester cathedral, nave looking east

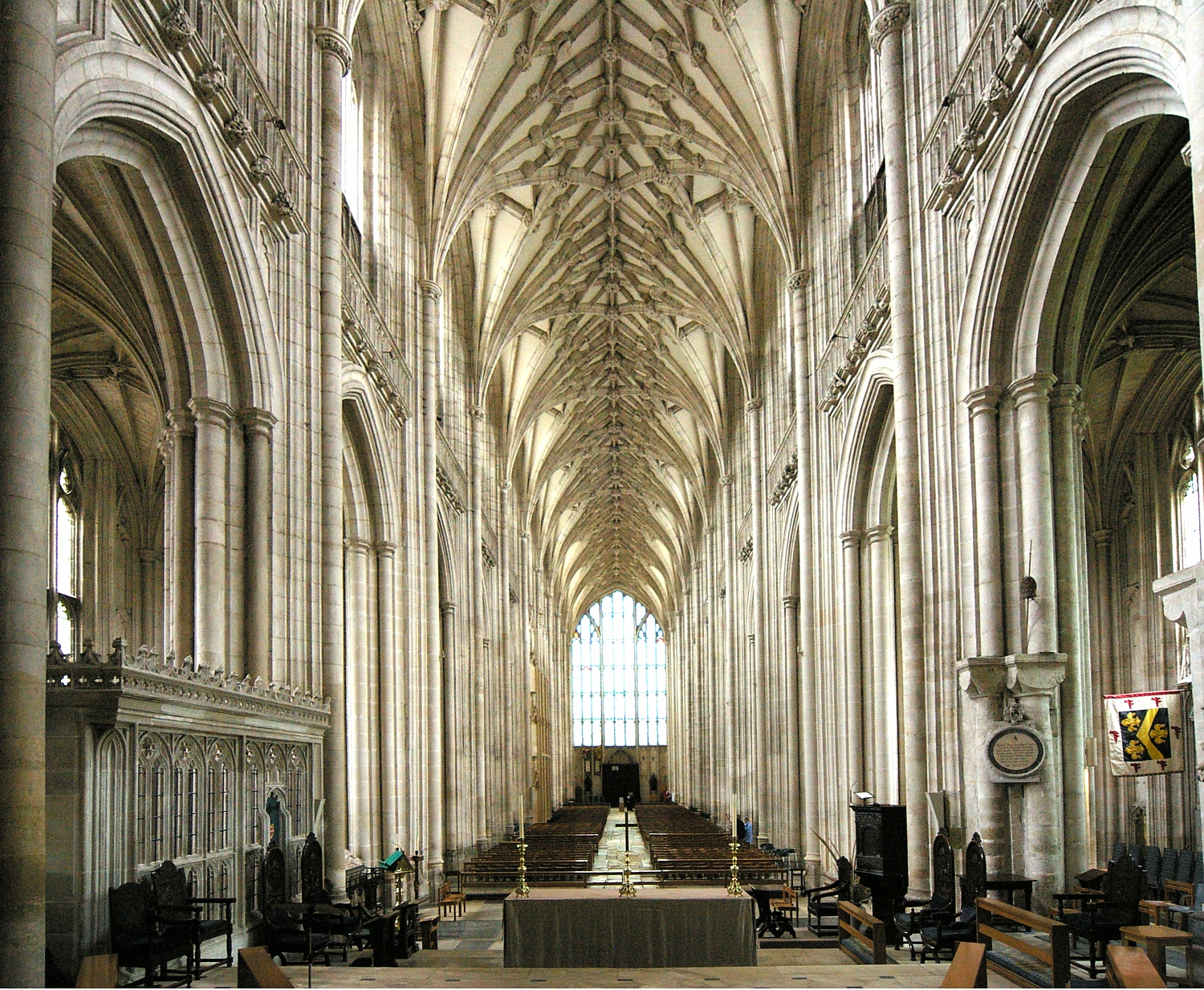
Winchester cathedral, nave looking west

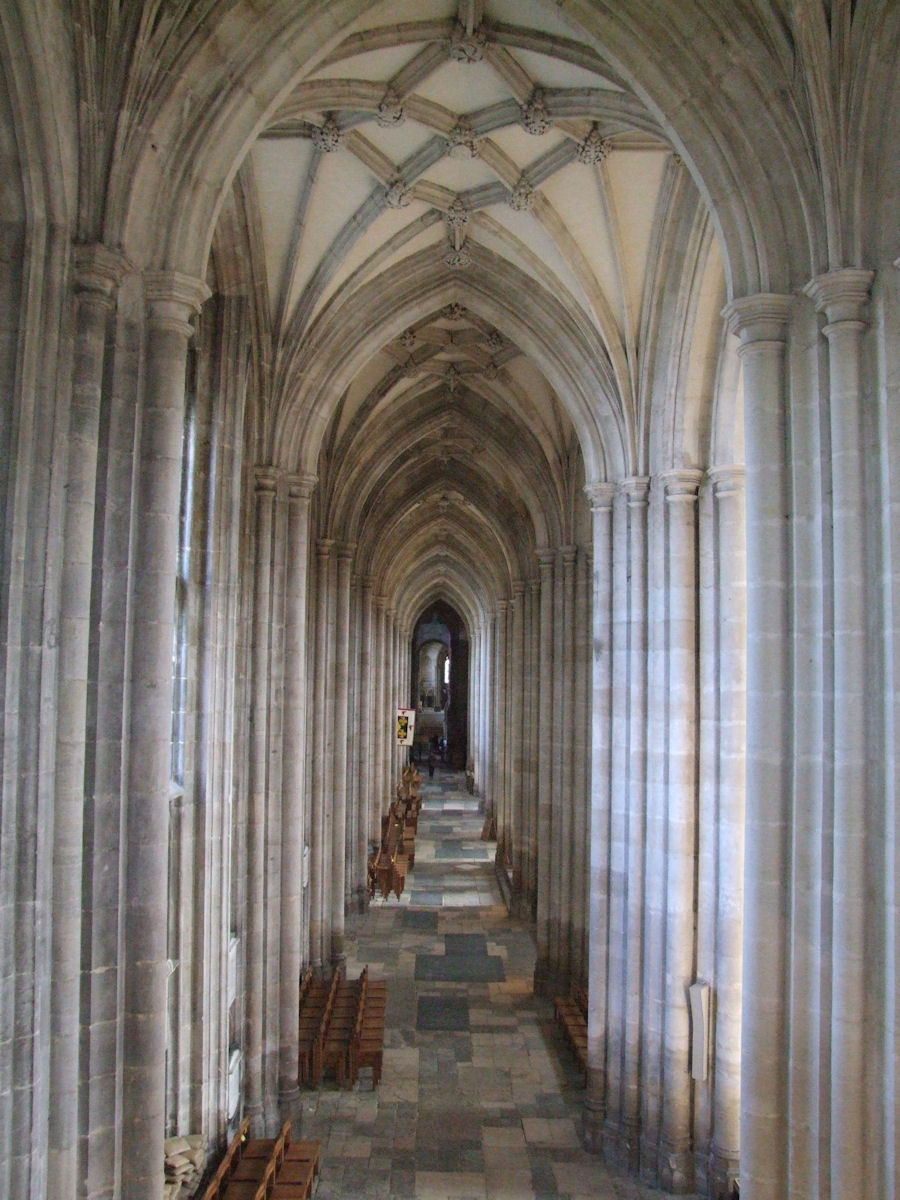
Winchester cathedral, south aisle looking east

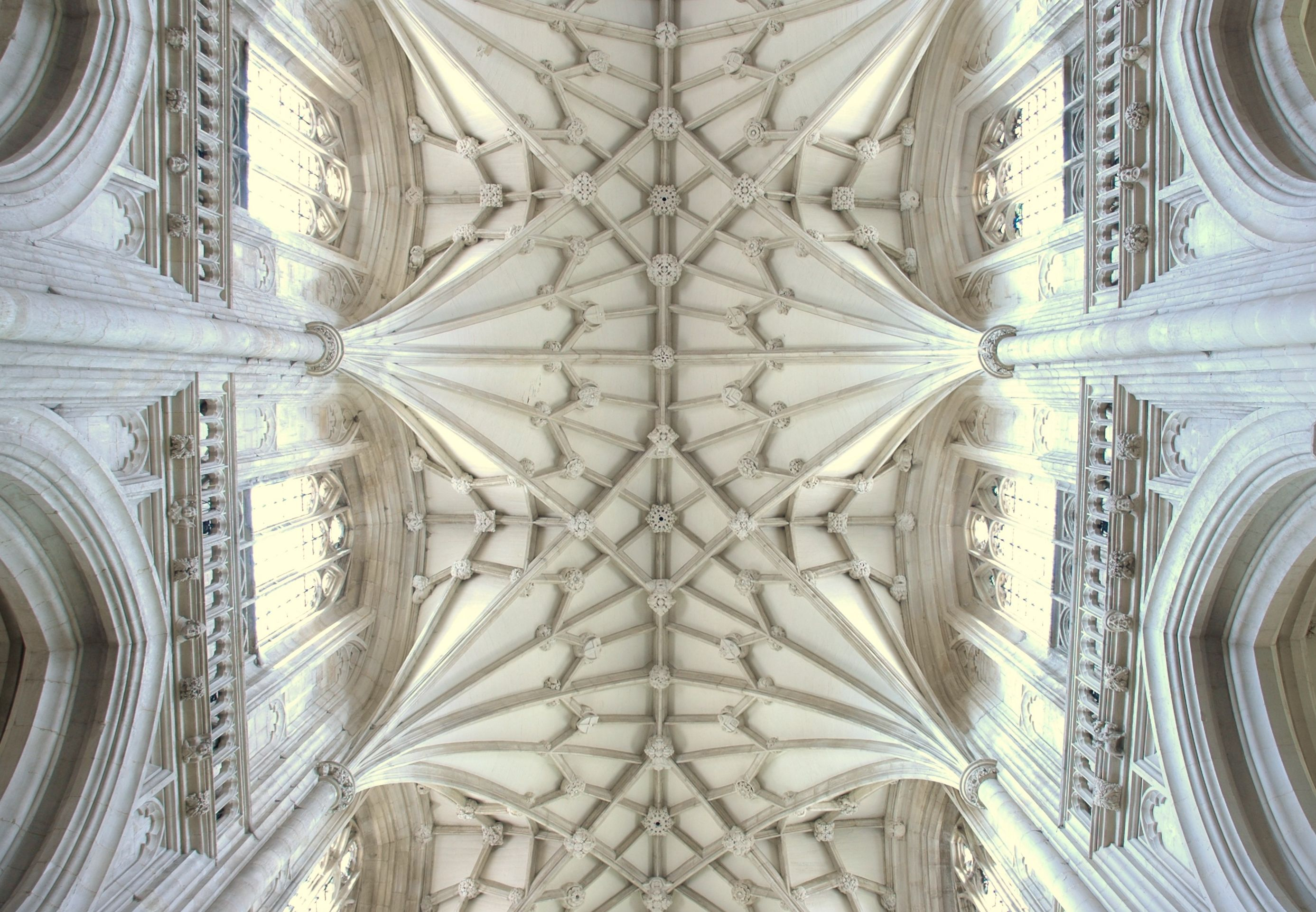
Winchester cathedral, nave vaulting
