= William of Wykeham =

14th-century Bishop of Winchester and Chancellor of England

- Bishop of Winchester
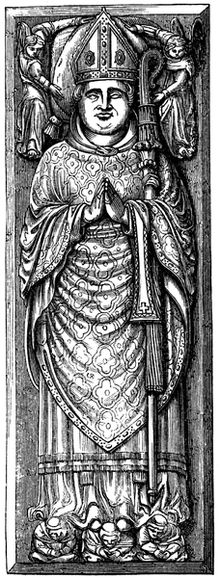
- William of Wykeham, Bishop of Winchester, 1367-1404: from his tomb at Winchester.
- Church: Roman Catholic
- Appointed: 12 July 1367
- Term ended: 27 September 1404
- Predecessor: William Edington
- Successor: Henry Beaufort

Orders
- Ordination: 1362
- Consecration: 10 October 1367 by Simon Langham

Personal details
- Born: 1320 or 1324
- Died: 27 September 1404 (aged c. 82)
- Coat of arms

William of Wykeham (/ˈwɪkəm/; 1320 or 1324 – 27 September 1404) was Bishop of Winchester and Chancellor of England. He founded New College, Oxford, and New College School in 1379, and founded Winchester College in 1382. He was also the clerk of works when much of Windsor Castle was built.

== Early life ==
William of Wykeham (born William Longe) was the son of John Longe, a freeman from Wickham in Hampshire. He was educated at a school in Winchester, and probably enjoyed early patronage from two local men, Sir Ralph Sutton, constable of Winchester Castle, and Sir John Scures, lord of the manor of Wickham, and then from Thomas Foxley, Constable of Windsor Castle. In 1349, Wykeham was described as a chaplain when he was appointed rector of Irstead in Norfolk, a position which was in the gift of the Crown.

== Builder ==
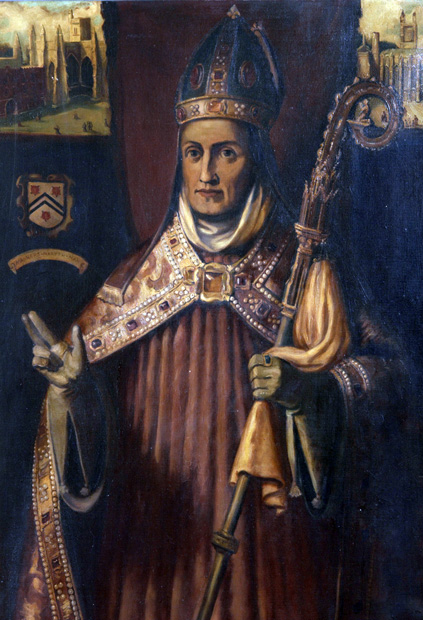
Portrait (posthumous), showing the two colleges he founded, and his coat of arms and motto

William became secretary to the constable of Winchester Castle and in that capacity learned about building. This led to architectural work for King Edward III, for whom he reconstructed Windsor Castle whilst residing at Bear's Rails in Old Windsor.

William developed a reputation for the administration and supervision of royal building works during the reign of Edward III. By May 1356, he was clerk of the works for houses being built for the Crown at Henley on the Heath in Surrey and Easthampstead in Berkshire, and he was appointed surveyor of the long-running works to develop Windsor Castle in October 1356. He rapidly rose in royal service, and in July 1359 he was appointed chief keeper and surveyor of Windsor Castle, Leeds Castle, Dover Castle, and Hadleigh Castle, and many royal manors, including Sheen, Eltham and Langley, effectively in the office later called clerk of the king's works. He also took charge of the building works at Queenborough on the Isle of Sheppey in Kent.

== State administrator under Edward III ==
William's career took a turn by 1361, when he became a royal secretary, part of the administration of the royal finances, and by 1363 he was a royal councillor. He was present when the Treaty of Brétigny was agreed in Calais in 1360. In January 1361, Edward III and John II of France jointly petitioned Pope Innocent VI to make William a canon at Lincoln Cathedral. He was appointed Justice in Eyre south of the Trent along with Peter Atte Wode in 1361, a position he held until about 1367. William was ordained in 1362 and paid for his services by being given the incomes of various churches. For instance, in April 1363, Edward III presented him to the archdeaconry of Lincoln, a move that was approved by Pope Urban V in November 1363 only after representations from Sir Nicholas de Loveyne, the king's ambassador to the papal court. By 1366, William held two benefices and eleven prebends, with an annual income exceeding £800.

William had shown considerable talent as an administrator and in June 1363 was appointed Lord Privy Seal and then in October 1366 he was elected Bishop of Winchester, Pope Urban V approved his appointment in July 1367, and he was consecrated at St Paul's Cathedral in London on 10 October 1367 and enthroned at Winchester Cathedral in July 1368. In 1367 he was appointed Chancellor of England. He struggled to find the funds necessary to pay the army fighting against France after conflict resumed in 1369. He lost the favour of the king, who turned to William Latimer, 4th Baron Latimer, and he resigned as Chancellor in 1371.

As Edward III aged and weakened, William maintained good relationships with Edmund Mortimer, 3rd Earl of March, John of Gaunt and Edward, the Black Prince. He remained politically important, and was one of four bishops appointed to the new royal council in May 1376 after Latimer was impeached during the Good Parliament. His friendship with the Earl of March led to a long conflict with John of Gaunt, who supported Latimer. Latimer was pardoned by king in October 1376, and William found himself charged with financial irregularities and mismanagement towards the end of the year. He was banished from court and the income from his church properties was seized in late 1376, but he was pardoned by the new king Richard II in July 1377, weeks after Edward III died. (Richard was the son of Edward, the Black Prince, who had died in June 1376, a year before his father.)

== Richard II ==
Under Richard II, William resumed his position as a royal councillor. Although he took the side of the Lords Appellant in their disputes with the king in 1388, he also managed to maintain good relations with the king, and served as Chancellor again from May 1389 to September 1391.

After years of supporting poor scholars at Oxford University, he founded New College, which was granted a royal charter in 1379. He also founded a school, Winchester College, to supply New College with students, obtaining a papal bull in 1378 and a royal licence in 1382. Construction work began in Oxford in 1380, and in Winchester in 1387, under the architect William Wynford. At both colleges, William stipulated daily prayers for Richard II and his queen, William and his parents, and his former patrons, Sir Ralph Sutton, Sir John Scures, and Thomas Foxley. The funds to endow the colleges, and pay for the building works, came from William's lucrative church positions, discounting of exchequer tallies (that is, speculation on tax revenues due to the king), exporting wool, and using his influence to obtain papal approval for the acquisition of the income of the "alien priories" that belonged to monasteries in France, which were confiscated by the crown during the Hundred Years' War. He also started the rebuilding of the nave of Winchester Cathedral in 1394.

William was concentrating on his foundation by the time Henry IV deposed Richard II in 1399, but he welcomed the new king in Winchester in 1400.

== Death and legacy ==
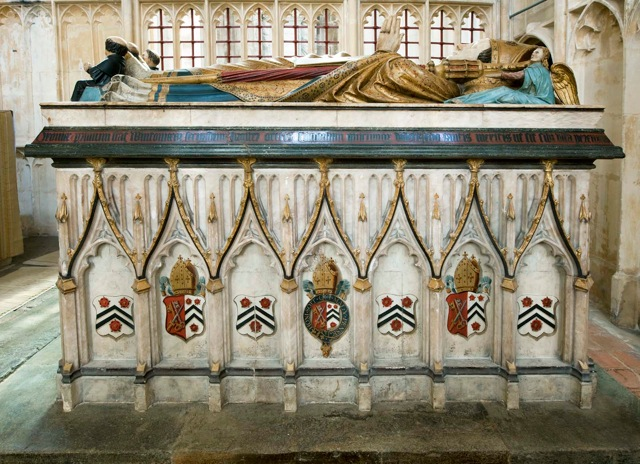
Funerary effigy of William of Wykeham in Winchester Cathedral

William died at Bishop's Waltham in Hampshire on 27 September 1404 and was buried in his chantry chapel on the south side of the nave in Winchester Cathedral. At the time of his death, he was one of the richest men in England. Much of his wealth went into the schools he patronised, but he also contrived to leave a fortune to a nephew, whose descendants include the Twisleton-Wykeham-Fiennes family and the Longe family.

William's motto was 'Manners makyth man'. This, along with a coat of arms, was assumed by him and not acquired by descent. His biography was written by Bishop Lowth. He was also written about by Lord Brougham in his 'Old England's Worthies' (1857) and by Froissart. 'Manners Makyth Man' is also the motto of the establishments Wykeham founded, Winchester College and New College, Oxford.

== Citations ==
Legal offices
Preceded by Thomas de Braose	Justice in Eyre south of the Trent with Peter atte Wood; 1361–1367	Succeeded by John de la Lee
Political offices
Preceded by John Buckingham	Lord Privy Seal; 1363–1367	Succeeded by Peter Lacy
Preceded by Simon Langham	Lord Chancellor; 1367–1371	Succeeded by Sir Robert Thorpe
Preceded by Thomas Arundel	Lord Chancellor; 1389–1391	Succeeded by Thomas Arundel
Catholic Church titles
Preceded by William Edington	Bishop of Winchester; 1366–1404	Succeeded by Henry Beaufort
