= William Brantingham (disambiguation) =

William Brantingham (died 1548) was seneschal of the prior of Durham in 1536–1537.

William Brantingham or William de Brantingham may also refer to:

- William de Brantingham, 14th-century knight
- William Brantingham, beneficiary of the will of Thomas Sparke, Bishop of Berwick
