= Brantingham family =

Arms of Brantingham family

The Brantinghams (or, formerly, the de Brantinghams or de Brantynghams) are an old noble family from North East England, originally from Brantingham in Yorkshire.

== Coat of arms ==
An early Brantingham coat of arms may be preserved in one of two seals attached to document WYL639/191 of the West Yorkshire Archive Services. The document is a grant of land, dated 18 September 1369, by Nicholas de Brantingham and Richard Bonefaunt to Robert Bonefaunt, vicar of Otley, and Nicholas, vicar of Weston. Two seals in red wax attached to the grant are (i) a design of five burs, with no legend, and (ii) a bird, with an indistinct legend. However, in the absence of distinct legends, it remains uncertain whether either of the seals belongs to Nicholas de Brantingham.

Later in the same century, Thomas de Brantingham, bishop of Exeter and Lord Treasurer, bore arms sable, a fess crenelle, between three Catherine wheels, or.

== Political influence ==
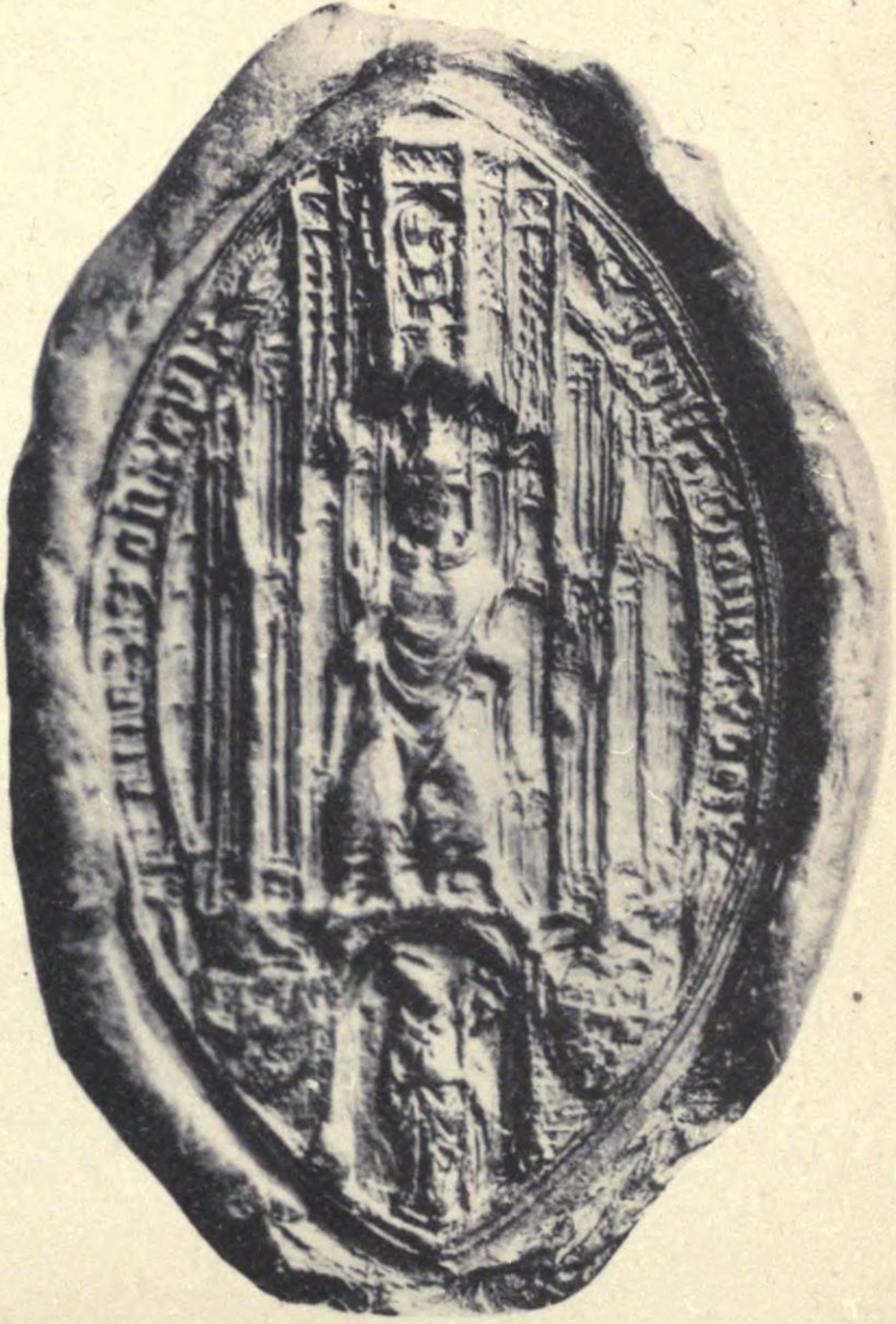
Seal of Thomas de Brantingham

During the fourteenth century, and in particular during the reign of Edward III, several de Brantinghams held great offices of the state, including Ralph de Brantingham, King's Chamberlain to Edward III from 1349, and Thomas de Brantingham (died 1394), Lord Treasurer from 1369 to 1371 and Bishop of Exeter from 1370 until his death.

The Brantinghams had close relationships with many of the leading families of the North East. Ralph de Brantingham was granted two shops in Penrith, Cumbria, by Ralph de Neville, second Baron Neville de Raby, and his daughter, Thomasina, married Thomas de Salcock of a noble family from Sawcock. Anne Fletame of Stockton, an ancestor of Sir Samuel Garth, in her will of 24 April 1562, bequeathed a linen kerchief, an apron and a pair of hose to Jane Brantingham. Nathaniel Brantingham married Anne, daughter of Matthew White of Redheugh, a gentleman connected to the Lambtons, later Earls of Durham, and was bequeathed 40 shillings in White's will of 29 December 1586.

== Scandals ==
The de Brantinghams were implicated in several scandals of the period: Sir William de Brantingham, a knight, was found to have used "chicaneries" to reassign property on the death of his ward; and Simon de Brantingham was dismissed as steward of the Hospital of St John the Baptist in Dorchester, Dorset, for having sold off the hospital's land and carried away linens and bedding from the hospital.

Several Brantinghams found themselves in brushes with the law:

- In 1341/1342, Randulph de Brantyngham, former rector of the church of Hotham, was the defendant in the Curia Ebor in an action brought against him for "violation of church rights" by Richard de Wath, his successor in the rectory.
- On 28 January 1365, Emma, wife of the late John de Brantingham of York, chaloner, was pardoned by Robert de Thorpe, Chief Justice of the Common Pleas, on her surrender to the Fleet Prison. The case, heard at Westminster, concerned Emma de Brantingham, executrix of her husband's will, for her waiver in the county of York for non-appearance before the justices of the Bench to answer William de Wederhale of York, pulter, touching a plea that she render to him 10l. 2s.
- On 10 September 1594, Richard Brantingham of St Helen Auckland was pardoned by Elizabeth I for burglary.

== Descent into penury ==
However, by the sixteenth century, at least one branch of the family seems to have fallen from grace. One John Brantingham is mentioned in the will of John Benley Prest, dated 20 December 1564, as having taken on William Prentis (a beneficiary of the will) as an indentured servant. From Prentis' second indenture, as an apprentice to a tailor, it may be that Brantingham was also in the same trade. Six years later, the will of one Margery Brantingham of the parish of St Andrew's, Auckland, dated 30 September 1570, states that she was working as a servant to John Robinson of Myddleston. The inventory of her possessions is not abundant, and that her presumed relations, Leonard and Edward Brantingham, owed her money suggests that the family as a whole had fallen on hard times.

This branch of the family seems to have continued to try several trades: the burial register of St Nicholas' Church, Durham records the burial of Elizabeth Brantingham, a daughter of Jarard Brantingham, a "rough mason".

== Influence in the clergy ==
The Brantinghams maintained a presence in the religious life of North East England. John de Brantingham was empowered by Pope John XXII himself in June 1318 to take up the rectory of Huggate in the diocese of York, in addition to the rectory of Askeby and a prebend of Derby Cathedral. He is later recorded as vicar of Otley in Yorkshire. Thomas Sparke, Bishop of Berwick, in his will of July 1572, records among his illustrious debtors (who also included Charles Neville, sixth Earl of Westmoreland) William Brantingham, "priest" (although not to be confused with William Brantingham, seneschal of the prior of Durham, who died in 1548).

== List of notable Brantinghams ==
- John de Brantingham, a clergyman of the early fourteenth century.
- Ralph de Brantingham, King's Chamberlain to Edward III from 1349.
- Thomas de Brantingham, Lord Treasurer from 1369 to 1371 and Bishop of Exeter from 1370 until his death.
- Sir William de Brantingham, a knight and executor of wills of the fourteenth century.
- Simon de Brantingham, disgraced steward of the Hospital of St John the Baptist in Dorchester, Dorset.
- Robert de Brantingham (d. c. 1400), of whom a half-effigy in brass is in St Martin's Church in East Horsley.
- William Brantingham, seneschal of the prior of Durham in 1536/1537.
- Richard Brantingham of Seaton, County Durham, buried at Stranton on 29 May 1657, having lived to the age of 106.
- Ashton Brantingham

== Bibliography ==
- Boynton, G. R., ed. (2003), "Membrane 36" (PDF), Calendar of patent rolls, University of Iowa Libraries.
- Burke, J. Bernard (1850), The St James's magazine and heraldic and historical register, vol. 2, London: E. Churton.
- Duchess of Cleveland (1889), Battle Abbey Roll, vol. 2, John Murray, archived from the original on 2011-08-10.
- Green, Mary Anne Everett, ed. (1867), Calendar of state papers, domestic series, of the reign of Elizabeth, 1591 - 1594, London: Longmans, Green, Reader and Dyer.
- Lyte, H. C. Maxwell, ed. (1894), "B. 2911", A descriptive catalogue of ancient deeds, vol. 2, British History Online, pp. 346–356.
- Oliver, George (1861), Lives of the bishops of Exeter, Exeter: William Roberts.
- Page, William, ed. (1908). "Hospitals: Dorchester". A History of the County of Dorset. Victoria County History. Vol. 2. pp. 101–103.
- Surrey Archaeological Society (1920), Surrey archaeological collections, vol. 33.
- Surtees Society (1891), "Sawcock", Guisborough Chartulary, Publications of the Surtees Society, vol. 89, Surtees Society.
- Surtees Society (1835), Wills and inventories illustrative of the history, manners, language, statistics, &c. of the northern counties of England from the eleventh century downwards, Publications of the Surtees Society, Surtees Society.
- Sykes, John (1833), Local records, vol. 1, Newcastle: John Sykes.
