= John de Brantingham =

- Died: Before 1365
- Offices held: Prebendary of Derby Cathedral; Rector of Askeby; Rector of Huggate; Vicar of Otley

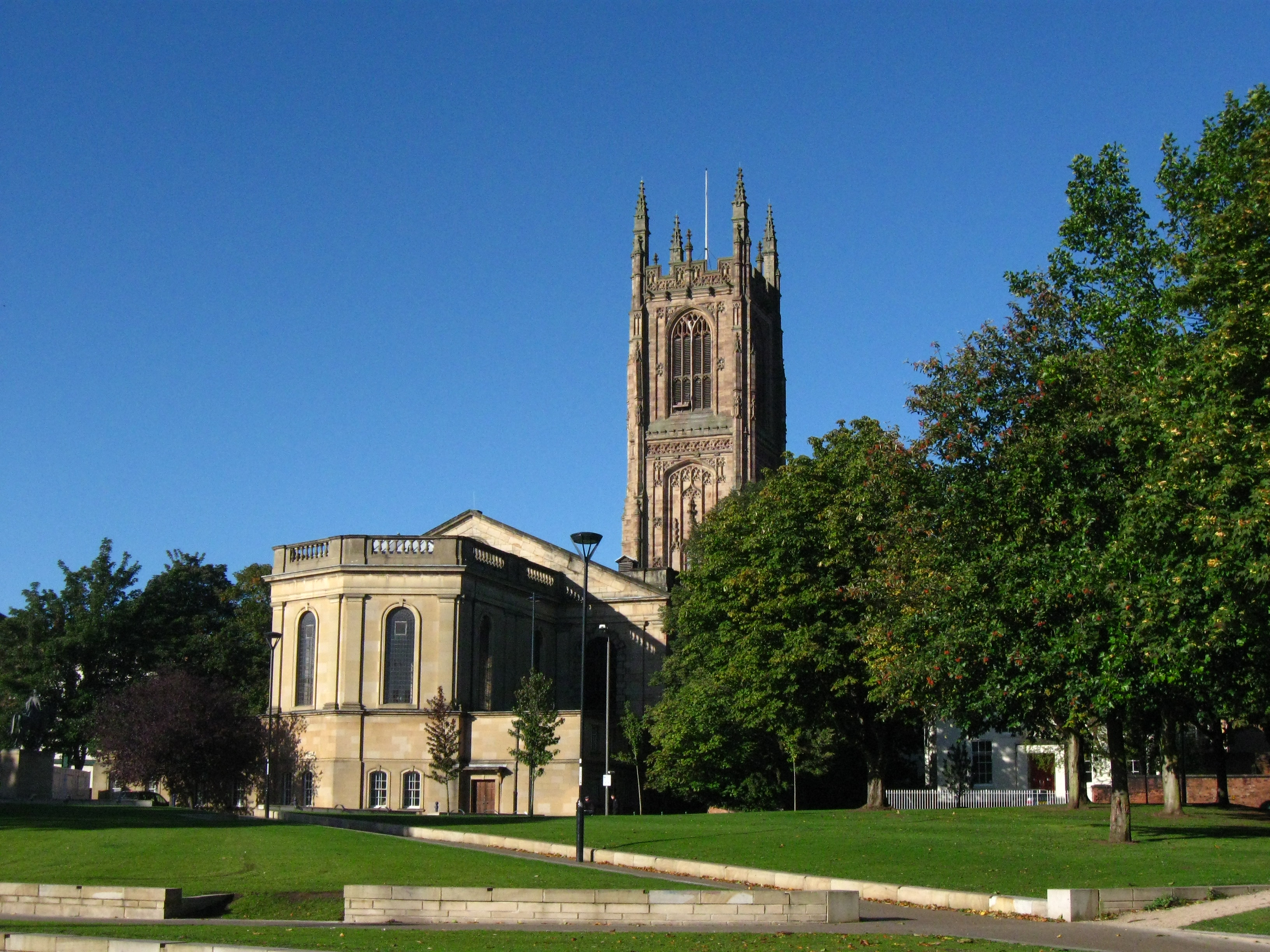
Derby Cathedral

John de Brantingham (died before 1365) was an English Christian clergyman of the early 14th century and a member of the Brantingham family. He held a prebend of Derby Cathedral, value five marks a year, and the rectory of Askeby, worth 20 marks annually. In June 1318, Pope John XXII empowered de Brantingham to hold, in addition to his existing posts, the rectory of Huggate in the diocese of York, worth 40 pounds per annum. Later, de Brantingham also served as vicar of Otley in Yorkshire. Clearly a prodigious clergyman, de Brantingham appeared at the Parliament of Carlisle in 1306/1307 as a proxy for the Archdeacon of Surrey and, later, as a substitute for Henry de Tychewell, who was a proxy for the archdeaconry of Surrey.

== Personal life ==
In 1325, William Melton, Archbishop of York, granted to de Brantingham, then vicar of Otley, the wardship and marriage of Agnes, daughter and heir of John Malebrank of Farnley.

De Brantingham is also recorded as a witness to the grant by William Peyle to William Mariot of a half-acre of land in the territory of Sileby in the field called Suzerenemers, for 22 shillings; rent a rose a year.

== Bibliography ==
- Boynton, G. R., ed. (2003), "Membrane 36" (PDF), Calendar of patent rolls, University of Iowa Libraries.
- Duchess of Cleveland (1889), Battle Abbey Roll, vol. 2, John Murray, archived from the original on 10 August 2011.
- Page, William, ed. (1907). A History of the County of Derby. Victoria County History. Vol. 2.
- Strachey, John; Pridden, John; Upham, Edward (1832), "Brantingham", Rolls of Parliament, London.
