= Brasbridge =

Brasbridge is a surname. Notable people with the surname include:

- Joseph Brasbridge (1743–1832), English silversmith and autobiographer
- Thomas Brasbridge (1536/37–1593), English divine and author
