= John Strachey =

John Strachey may refer to:

- John Strachey (geologist) (1671–1743), British geologist
- John Strachey (civil servant) (1823–1907), British civil servant in India
- John Strachey (journalist) (1860–1927), editor of The Spectator
- John Strachey (politician) (1901–1963), British Labour politician
- John Strachey (priest) (1737–1818), Archdeacon of Suffolk
- Jack Strachey (1894–1972), English composer and songwriter

== See also ==
- Strachey
