= William Bullein =

English physician and cleric (c. 1515–1576)

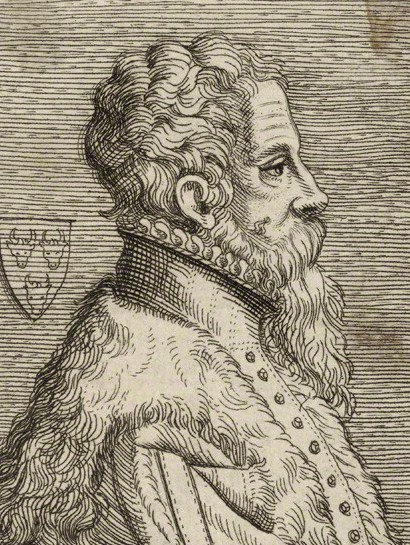
William Bullein, 1722 engraving

William Bullein (c.1515–1576) was an English physician and cleric.

== Life ==
On 9 June 1550 Bullein was instituted to the rectory of Blaxhall in Suffolk, where some of his relations lived. This preferment he resigned before 5 November 1554. He afterwards travelled on the continent to study medicine, and it is supposed that he took the degree of M.D. abroad. His name is not found on the roll of the Royal College of Physicians.

Bullein died on 7 January 1576, and was buried on 9 January at St. Giles's, Cripplegate. In the same grave were buried his brother Richard, another cleric and medical writer, and John Foxe. Over the tomb was a plated stone with a Latin inscription, commemorating the virtues of all three. Bullein's views were Puritan, and he has been compared to Thomas Brasbridge.

== Works ==
In 1558–59 Bullein published A newe booke entituled the Gouernement of Healthe. It was dedicated to Sir Thomas Hilton, knight, baron of Hilton and captain of Tynemouth Castle. A second edition appeared in 1595; it concludes with a new prose Epilogue, dated 1 March 1559.

In 1562–63 appeared Bullein's Bulwarke. The treatise is dedicated, from London, to Henry Carey, 1st Baron Hunsdon, and was written in prison. It is divided into four parts: (1) Booke of Simples, (2) Dialogue betwene Sorenes and Chyrurgi, (3) Booke of Compounds, (4) Booke of the Vse of sicke men and medicens. The Booke of Simples is one of the earliest of English herbals. In the Dialogue betwene Sorenes and Chyrurgi he inveighs against the race of quacksalvers; elsewhere in the same dialogue he gives a list of eminent English chirurgeons, mentioning the achievements of each. He relates, among other matters: a cure that he had worked on Sir Richard Alie, a knight known for skill in fortifications; some Suffolk witches that he had known; and that he was for some time under the patronage of Sir John Delaval (1498–1562). This work was under the influence of the Castell of Health of Thomas Elyot. The content was largely Galenist, but with early mentions of Paracelsian ideas.

In 1564–65 Bullein published A Dialogue bothe pleasaunte and pietifull. It combines eloquence with humorous anecdotes and satire. Bullein aimed to prescribe remedies against the sweating-sickness, imported from Le Havre in 1564, but to encourage his countrymen in their affliction. The Dialogue consists of a number of separate scenes: the second is between a rich usurer, Antonius, and Medicus, who in the 1564 edition is styled Antonius Capistrinus, but who in later editions bears the name Dr. Tocrub, probably intended for Dr. Burcot (Burchard Kranich), who is satirised in succeeding dialogues. Arthur Henry Bullen and Mark W. Bullen edited the Dialogue against the Fever Pestilence (1888).

Bullein also wrote:

- A comfortable Regiment and a very wholsome order against the moste perilous Pleurisie, whereof many doe daily die within this Citee of London and other places …, London, 1562, black letter. Dedicated to Sir Robert Wingfield of Letheringham, knight.
- A briefe and short discourse of the Vertue and Operation of Balsame. With an instruction for those that haue their health to preserue the same. Whereunto is added Doctor Bullin's Diet for Health, London, 1585, black letter.

Some verses by Bullein are prefixed to John Sadler's translation of Flavius Vegetius, 1572. An Almanack and Prognostication of Master Bulleins was licensed to Abraham Vele in 1563–64, and Serten prayers of Master Bullion were licensed to Christopher Barker in 1569–70.

== Family ==
Bullein married Sir Thomas Hilton's widow Agnes or Anne, and was in London with her in 1561. William Hilton, brother of Sir Thomas, accused Bullein of causing his death. Some legal actions followed, and while writing the Bulwarke Bullein was in prison for debt. A widower by 1566, Bullein married Anne Doffield as his second wife in that year.
