= List of shipwrecks in February 1844 =

The list of shipwrecks in February 1844 includes ships sunk, foundered, wrecked, grounded, or otherwise lost during February 1844.

== 1 February ==
List of shipwrecks: 1 February 1844
Ship	State	Description
Ann	United Kingdom	The ship was driven ashore at Donegal. She was on a voyage from Donegal to London. She was refloated on 5 February and resumed her voyage.
Choice	United Kingdom	The ship ran aground on the West Barrows Sandbank, in the North Sea off the coast of Essex.
Deveron	United Kingdom	The ship ran aground on the Kentish Knock. She was on a voyage from South Shields, County Durham to Almería, Spain. She was refloated and beached at Ramsgate, Kent. Deveron was refloated the next day and taken in to Ramsgate.
James	United Kingdom	The ship ran aground on the Herd Sand, in the North Sea off the coast of County Durham. She was on a voyage from South Shields to Cullen, Morayshire. She was refloated and beached at South Shields.
Jane	United Kingdom	The ship was wrecked on the Goodwin Sands, Kent. Her crew were rescued by the steamship Belfast (United Kingdom). Jane was on a voyage from Newcastle upon Tyne, Northumberland to Honfleur, Calvados, France.
Ligure	Kingdom of Sardinia	The ship was wrecked on the coast of Calabria, Kingdom of the Two Sicilies. Her crew were rescued. She was on a voyage from Constantinople, Ottoman Empire to Genoa.
Maria	United Kingdom	The ship was driven ashore south of Ramsey, Isle of Man. She was refloated.
Stirling	United Kingdom	The brig was wrecked on Scroby Sands, Norfolk with the loss of six of her eight crew. Survivors were rescued by the Great Yarmouth Lifeboat. She was on a voyage from London to South Shields.
Urchin	United Kingdom	The ship was wrecked near Brindisi, Kingdom of the Two Sicilies. Her crew were rescued. She was on a voyage from Trieste to London.

== 2 February ==
List of shipwrecks: 2 February 1844
Ship	State	Description
Caroline	(United Kingdom of Great Britain and Ireland) Jersey	The cutter was driven ashore and severely damaged in St. Brélades Bay. She was refloated on 4 February and was towed in to Saint Helier.
Cinq Sœurs	France	The ship was wrecked near Carloforte, Kingdom of Sardinia with the loss of her captain. She was on a voyage from Rio Hacha, Republic of New Granada to Marseille, Bouches-du-Rhône.
Daniel	United Kingdom	The flat sank off New Brighton, Cheshire. Her crew were rescued by the Magazines Lifeboat.
Finland	(Russian Empire) Grand Duchy of Finland	The ship was wrecked on the Fish Keys, off Crooked Island, Bahamas. She was on a voyage from Trieste to Havana, Cuba.
Johanna	Hamburg	The ship ran aground on the Inner Vogelsand, in the North Sea. She was on a voyage from Newcastle upon Tyne, Northumberland, United Kingdom to Hamburg. She was refloated and taken in to Cuxhaven in a leaky condition.
Penryn Castle	United Kingdom	The ship was driven ashore at Plymouth, Devon. She was on a voyage from Southampton, Hampshire to Dublin.
Rudolf Morgan	United Kingdom	The ship ran aground at Beaumaris, Anglesey. She was on a voyage from Runcorn, Cheshire to Dublin.
Woodland Castle	United Kingdom	The ship ran aground on the Red Sand, off the north Kent coast. She was on a voyage from Galway to London. She was refloated and resumed her voyage.

== 3 February ==
List of shipwrecks: 3 February 1844
Ship	State	Description
Anne	United Kingdom	The ship was driven ashore in the Dardanelles. She was on a voyage from Liverpool, Lancashire to Constantinople, Ottoman Empire. She was refloated on 14 February and taken in to Constantinople.
Intrepid	United Kingdom	The ship foundered in the Indian Ocean. She was on a voyage from Calcutta, india to London.
Josephine	France	The ship was driven ashore in the "St. Ware de la Hague River". Her crew were rescued. She was on a voyage from Cherbourg, Seine-Inférieure to Paimpol, Côtes du Nord.
Palestine	United Kingdom	The ship was destroyed by fire in the Indian Ocean. Twenty-one of her crew were rescued by Solway (United Kingdom), the other thirteen crew reached Île Bourbon in the ship's cutter. Palestine was on a voyage from Newcastle upon Tyne, Northumberland to Bombay, India.
Salome	United Kingdom	The ship was driven ashore in the Dardanelles. She was on a voyage from Newcastle upon Tyne, Northumberland to Constantinople. She was refloated on 14 February and taken in to Constantinople.

== 4 February ==
List of shipwrecks: 4 February 1844
Ship	State	Description
Harp	United Kingdom	The ship was abandoned in the Atlantic Ocean. All on board were rescued by Rialto (United Kingdom). Harp was on a voyage from Saint John, New Brunswick to Barbados.

== 5 February ==
List of shipwrecks: 5 February 1844
Ship	State	Description
Anne	United Kingdom	The ship was wrecked near Ailsa Craig. She was on a voyage from Cork to Glasgow, Renfrewshire.
Brodie	United Kingdom	The ship struck the Heaps, in the North Sea and was damaged. She was on a voyage from Kiel, Prussia to London. She was refloated and put in to Wivenhoe, Essex, in a leaky condition.
Carolina	United States	The ship was driven ashore in the Mississippi River. She was on a voyage from Rio de Janeiro, Brazil to New Orleans, Louisiana.
Halifax	(United Kingdom of Great Britain and Ireland) British North America.	The ship was abandoned in the Atlantic Ocean Her crew were rescued by Gleaner (United Kingdom). Halifax was on a voyage from Halifax, Nova Scotia to Antigua. She was subsequently towed in to Bermuda by Gleaner.
Julia	(United Kingdom of Great Britain and Ireland) Guernsey	The ship ran aground off Havre de Grâce, Seine-Inférieure, France. She was on a voyage from Caen, Calvados, France to London. She was refloated and taken in to Havre de Grâce in a sinking condition.
Margaret	United Kingdom	The brig was wrecked near Cape Farina, Beylik of Tunis. Her crew survived. She was on a voyage from Tunis to Hull, Yorkshire.
Octarara	United States	The ship was abandoned in the Atlantic Ocean (38°49′N 68°22′W). Her crew were rescued by Mary Frances (United States). Octarara was on a voyage from Hull, Yorkshire, United Kingdom to New York.
Paris	United Kingdom	The ship struck the West Barrows, in the North Sea off the coast of Essex. She was on a voyage from South Shields, County Durham to London. She was refloated and put in to Wivenhoe in a leaky condition.

== 6 February ==
List of shipwrecks: 6 February 1844
Ship	State	Description
Brothers	United Kingdom	The ship was driven ashore and severely damaged at Wells-next-the-Sea, Norfolk. She was refloated but was beached.
Caravan	Denmark	The brig was driven ashore on the coast of Rio Grande do Norte, Brazil.
Wanderer	United Kingdom	The ship was wrecked at Port Maria, Jamaica. Her crew were rescued.

== 7 February ==
List of shipwrecks: 7 February 1844
Ship	State	Description
Ann	United Kingdom	The ship ran aground on the Nore. She was refloated.
Ann and James	United Kingdom	The schooner collided with the brig Rosa (United Kingdom) and foundered in the North Sea off Aldeburgh, Suffolk. Her crew were rescued.
Java	Netherlands	The ship was driven ashore in the Gironde River. She was on a voyage from Batavia, Netherlands East Indies to Bordeaux, Gironde. She was refloated on 11 February and towed into Bordeaux by the steamship Duc d'Orleans (France).
Marsden	United Kingdom	The ship ran aground on the Nore. She was refloated.
Soleil d'Austerlitz	France	The ship was driven ashore near Messina, Sicily. She was on a voyage from Havre de Grâce, Seine-Inférieure to Venice, Kingdom of Lombardy–Venetia.
Velocity	United Kingdom	The ship was driven ashore at Bude, Cornwall.
Wanderer	United Kingdom	The ship foundered in the Irish Sea off Walney Island, Lancashire. Her crew were rescued.

== 8 February ==
List of shipwrecks: 8 February 1844
Ship	State	Description
Brisk	United Kingdom	The cutter was driven ashore near Castle Cornet, Guernsey, Channel Islands. She was refloated the next day.
Eagle	United Kingdom	The flat was driven ashore near Formby, Lancashire.
Eleanor Jane	(United Kingdom of Great Britain and Ireland) British North America	The ship was cut through by ice and sank on the Hollis Flat. She was on a voyage from Saint John, New Brunswick to Alexandria, Province of Canada.
Jane	United Kingdom	The ship was driven ashore at Ayr. She was on a voyage from Drogheda, County Louth to Ayr. She was refloated on 21 February and taken in to Ayr.
Java	Netherlands	The ship was driven ashore on the Grand Bank. She was on a voyage from Batavia, Netherlands East Indies to Bordeaux, Gironde, France.
Ino	United Kingdom	The ship struck rocks at Guernsey, Channel Islands and was severely damaged.
Seaforth	United Kingdom	The flat was driven ashore near Formby.
Velocity	United Kingdom	The ship was driven ashore at Bude, Cornwall and was damaged. She was on a voyage from Llanelly, Glamorgan to Bude.
HMS Wilberforce	Royal Navy	The paddle steamer ran aground on the Dog Island Rocks, in the Gambia River and was holed. She was condemned in February 1845.

== 9 February ==
List of shipwrecks: 9 February 1844
Ship	State	Description
Baronet	United Kingdom	The brig was wrecked on Galeta Island, Algeria. Her crew survived. She was on a voyage from Smyrna, Ottoman Empire to Liverpool, Lancashire.

== 10 February ==
List of shipwrecks: 10 February 1844
Ship	State	Description
Allioth	United States	The ship was driven ashore on Bermuda. She was on a voyage from Newcastle upon Tyne, Northumberland, United Kingdom to Boston, Massachusetts.
Cosmopolite	United Kingdom	The ship was wrecked on the Lillegrund, off the coast of Denmark. She was on a voyage from Memel, Prussia to Hull, Yorkshire.
Jane	United Kingdom	The ship ran aground on the Nore. She was refloated the next day and towed in to the River Thames.
Talbot	United Kingdom	The ship was wrecked on a reef off Cape Santa Maria, Ottoman Empire. She was on a voyage from Pernambuco, Brazil to Trieste.
Two Brothers	United Kingdom	The ship was driven ashore near Donna Nook, Lincolnshire. She was on a voyage from Wells-next-the-Sea, Norfolk to Wakefield, Yorkshire. She was refloated and put in to Grimsby, Lincolnshire.

== 11 February ==
List of shipwrecks: 11 February 1844
Ship	State	Description
Aurora	Kingdom of Sardinia	The ship was lost near Cape St Angelo, Greece. She was on a voyage from Alexandria, Egypt Eyalet to Genoa.
Franconian	United Kingdom	The ship was driven ashore near Formby, Lancashire. She was on a voyage from Liverpool, Lancashire to New York. She was refloated and put back to Liverpool.
Guden	Portugal	The ship was driven against the pier and severely damaged at Dieppe, Seine-Inférieure, France.
Jane	United Kingdom	The ship ran aground on the Nore and was damaged. She was refloated and taken in to Sheerness, Kent in a leaky condition.
Scothie	Ottoman Empire	The ship was wrecked near Gallipoli with the loss of over 300 lives. There were seven survivors. She was on a voyage from Alexandria, Egypt to Constantinople.

== 12 February ==
List of shipwrecks: 12 February 1844
Ship	State	Description
Jane Walker	United Kingdom	The ship was abandoned in the Atlantic Ocean. Her crew were rescued. She was on a voyage from Saint John, New Brunswick, British North America to Liverpool, Lancashire.
Jean	United Kingdom	The ship departed from Kirkcaldy, Fife for Hull, Yorkshire. No further trace, presumed foundered with the loss of all hands.
Ocean Queen	United Kingdom	The ship ran aground on the North Gar, in the North Sea off the coast of County Durham. She was refloated the next day.

== 13 February ==
List of shipwrecks: 13 February 1844
Ship	State	Description
Jupiter	United Kingdom	The ship was abandoned in the Atlantic Ocean with the loss of two of her crew. She was on a voyage from Glasgow, Renfrewshire to Boston, Massachusetts, United States.

== 14 February ==
List of shipwrecks: 14 February 1844
Ship	State	Description
Jean and Mary	United Kingdom	The ship ran aground off Wells-next-the-Sea, Norfolk. She was on a voyage from Wisbech, Cambridgeshire to London.
Lord Douglas	United Kingdom	The ship ran aground on Scroby Sands, Norfolk. She was on a voyage from Rotterdam, South Holland to Leith, Lothian. She was refloated and resumed her voyage.
Margaret	United Kingdom	The ship ran aground on the Whitby Rock. She was on a voyage from Stockton-on-Tees, County Durham to Scarborough, Yorkshire. She was refloated and resumed her voyage.
Neptune	United Kingdom	The ship struck the Whitby Rock and sank. Her crew were rescued. She drove ashore at Whitby on 17 February and was wrecked.
Rival	United Kingdom	The ship ran aground on the Whitby Rock. She was refloated.
Seine	France	The barque collided with Virginia (United States) and foundered in the English Channel off Start Point, Devon, United Kingdom. She was on a voyage from Havre de Grâce, Seine-Inférieure to Bordeaux, Gironde.
Simon Glover	United Kingdom	The ship was driven ashore near Penare, Cornwall. She was on a voyage from the Clyde to Gibraltar and Marseille, Bouches-du-Rhône, France. She was refloated on 17 February and taken in to Mevagissey, Cornwall.
Venezuela	Hamburg	The steamship ran aground on the Nore. She was on a voyage from Hamburg to London.

== 15 February ==
List of shipwrecks: 15 February 1844
Ship	State	Description
Auroy	France	The ship was wrecked on the Epinette Rock, off the Île d'Oléron, Charente-Maritime. Seven of her crew were rescued.
Brutus	United Kingdom	The ship ran aground in the River Moy. She was on a voyage from Ballina, County Mayo to London. Brutus was refloated on 19 February.
Coaxer	United Kingdom	The ship ran aground on the Great Reef, in the Rhio Strait. She was on a voyage from Singapore to London. She was later refloated and resumed her voyage.
Fontenoy	United Kingdom	The ship collided with Garland (United Kingdom and foundered in the North Sea 1.5 nautical miles (2.8 km) off Whitby, Yorkshire. Her crew were rescued.
Mary	United Kingdom	The ship was wrecked near "Pellier", Loire-Inférieure. Her crew were rescued.
Perseverance	(United Kingdom of Great Britain and Ireland) Van Diemen's Land	The schooner was wrecked in Moreton Bay. All on board were rescued.
Splendid	United Kingdom	The schooner was wrecked in the Monarch Islands, Outer Hebrides with the loss of one of her seven crew. She was on a voyage from Liverpool, Lancashire to Newcastle upon Tyne, Northumberland.

== 16 February ==
List of shipwrecks: 16 February 1844
Ship	State	Description
Defence	United Kingdom	The ship ran aground and was damaged at Portsmouth, Hampshire. She was on a voyage from Portsmouth to London. Defence was refloated the next day and resumed her voyage.
Gilmerton	United Kingdom	The ship struck the Neverston Rock, off the Farne Islands, Northumberland and sank. Her crew were rescued. She was on a voyage from Montrose, Forfarshire to London.
Marianne	Prussia	The ship was sunk by ice off Swinemünde. She was on a voyage from Swinemüne to Danzig.
Town of Dundee	United Kingdom	The steamship ran aground on the Gulbar Sand, off the coast of County Wexford.

== 17 February ==
List of shipwrecks: 17 February 1844
Ship	State	Description
Charles	Belgium	The brig ran aground in the Makassar Strait off the coast of Borneo and was abandoned by her crew.
Jeune Catherine	France	The ship was wrecked on the Caignard Rock, off Pleumeur-Bodou, Côtes-du-Nord with the loss of fifteen of her 21 crew.
Mentor	Bremen	The ship was driven ashore on Düne, Heligoland. Her crew were rescued, She was on a voyage from Trinidad de Cuba, Cuba to Bremen. Mentor was refloated on 19 May and taken in to Cuxhaven.

== 18 February ==
List of shipwrecks: 18 February 1844
Ship	State	Description
Aisthorpe	United Kingdom	The brig was driven ashore and damaged 2 nautical miles (3.7 km) south of Ravenglass, Cumberland.
Alecto	United Kingdom	The schooner ran aground in the River Thames at Cuckold's Point, Kent. She was subsequently run into by another vessel and was severely damaged.
Clipper	(United Kingdom of Great Britain and Ireland) British Guiana	The sloop capsized in the Demerara River with the loss of six lives.
Compte de Foi	France	The ship sprang a leak and was beached at Caen, Calvados.
Royalist	United Kingdom	The ship was driven ashore at "Calderfoot", Cumberland. Her crew were rescued. She was refloated on 21 February and towed in to Whitehaven, Cumberland.
Shannon	United Kingdom	The ship was driven ashore near Ravenglass. Her crew were rescued. She was on a voyage from Dublin to Whitehaven. She was refloated on 5 March and taken in to Whitehaven.
Skylark	United Kingdom	The ship was driven ashore at "Ebenfoot", Cumberland. Her crew were rescued.
Thomas Smith	United Kingdom	The ship sprang a leak and foundered off Guadeloupe. Her crew were rescued. She was on a voyage from Demerara, British Honduras to Liverpool, Lancashire.
Unity	United Kingdom	The ship sprang a leak and was abandoned in the English Channel off St. Alban's Head, Dorset. Her crew were rescued. She was on a voyage from St. Mawes, Cornwall to Rochester, Kent.

== 20 February ==
List of shipwrecks: 20 February 1844
Ship	State	Description
Arabian	United Kingdom	The ship ran aground at New Orleans, Louisiana, United States. She was on a voyage from New Orleans to Liverpool, Lancashire.
Asenath	United Kingdom	The ship was wrecked off Happisburgh, Norfolk with the loss of her captain.
Hannah Malvina	United Kingdom	The ship was wrecked on Scroby Sands, Norfolk. Her crew were rescued. She was on a voyage from South Shields, County Durham to London. Part of the wreck subsequently came ashore at Lowestoft, Suffolk on 22 February.
Harriet	United Kingdom	The flat sank near Rhyl, Denbighshire. Her crew were rescued.
Home	United Kingdom	The brig was destroyed by fire at North Shields, County Durham.
Industrie	France	The ship was driven ashore near Cherbourg, Seine-Inférieure. She was on a voyage from Rouen, Seine-Inférieure to Morlaix, Finistère.
Nickerie	Netherlands	The East Indiaman was wrecked on the Western Rocks, in the Isles of Scilly, United Kingdom with the loss of all but two of her nineteen crew. She was on a voyage from Samarang, Netherlands East Indies to Rotterdam, South Holland.
Thomas & Ann	United Kingdom	The flat was driven ashore near Rhyl. Her crew were rescued.
William and Nancy	United Kingdom	The ship ran aground on the South Sand, in the North Sea off the coast of Essex. She floated off but consequently sank. Her crew were rescued. She was on a voyage from Carlisle, Cumberland to Sheerness, Kent.

== 21 February ==
List of shipwrecks: 21 February 1844
Ship	State	Description
Ann	(United Kingdom of Great Britain and Ireland) Cape Colony	The schooner was wrecked at Mauritius.
Augustine	France	The brigantine was wrecked at Bois Rouge, Île Bourbon.
Favourite	United Kingdom	The schooner ran aground on the Spaniard Sand, in the North Sea off the coast of Kent and was damaged. She was refloated.
Gerdtjes	Bremen	The ship was wrecked on the Neutrack. She was on a voyage from Carolinensiel, Kingdom of Hanover to Bremen.
Gipsey	United Kingdom	The schooner was lost at Sainte-Marie, Île Bourbon. Her crew were rescued.
Jacques Cartier	France	The ship was wrecked at Bois Rouge.
Julie	United Kingdom	The ship was lost at Sainte-Marie. Her crew were rescued.
Orion	United Kingdom	The ship ran aground on "Parris Island", Anglesey. She was on a voyage from Chester, Cheshire to Rouen, Seine-Inférieure, France.
Primrose	United Kingdom	The ship ran aground off Savannah, Georgia, United States. She was on a voyage from Dublin to Savannah. She was later refloated.
Redcliff	United Kingdom	The galiot was in collision with a brig in the Atlantic Ocean and was abandoned by her crew. She was on a voyage from Gibraltar to Bristol, Gloucestershire. Redcliff came ashore on the Île de Quéménès, Finistère, France on 25 February and was wrecked.
Stavanger Packet	Norway	The ship capsized in the Gottefiord with the loss of her captain. She was on a voyage from Stavanger to Hamburg.
Surat Merchant	Flag unknown	The ship was wrecked on a reef off Mauritius during a hurricane.

== 22 February ==
List of shipwrecks: 22 February 1844
Ship	State	Description
Antelope	Bremen	The brig ran aground on the Krautsand, in the North Sea and was damaged. She was on a voyage from Rio de Janeiro, Brazil to Hamburg.
Appolon	France	The ship ran aground off Dieppe, Seine-Inférieure and was severely damaged. She was refloated but was consequently beached.
Brothers	United Kingdom	The ship was driven ashore on Mauritius and was severely damaged. She was on a voyage from Liverpool, Lancashire to Mauritius. She was later refloated.
Elberfeldt	Netherlands	The paddle steamer broke in two and foundered 35 nautical miles (65 km) east of North Foreland, Kent, United Kingdom with the loss of three of her sixteen crew. She was on a voyage from Brielle, South Holland to London, United Kingdom. Survivors were rescued by the galiot Charlotte (Netherlands).
Enigkeit	Denmark	The ship was driven ashore at Wittow, Prussia and was subsequently wrecked. All on board were rescued. She was on a voyage from Bornholm to Copenhagen.
Enterprise	United Kingdom	The flat was wrecked at Southport, Lancashire. Her crew were rescued.
Express	United Kingdom	The smack ran aground on the Stony Binks, off the mouth of the Humber. She was on a voyage from Gainsborough, Lincolnshire to London. She was refloated but had to be beached.
Gipsy	United Kingdom	The ship was driven ashore on The Naze, Essex. She was on a voyage from Spalding, Lincolnshire to London. She was refloated and taken in to Harwich, Essex.
Jean	United Kingdom	The ship departed from Kirkcaldy, Fife for Hull, Yorkshire. No further trace, presumed foundered in the North Sea with the loss of all hands.
Leslie	United Kingdom	The brig was wrecked at Johnshaven, Aberdeenshire with the loss of all hands.
Sarah	United Kingdom	The ship caught fire and sank between the Shipwash and Whiting sands, in the North Sea off the coast of Essex. Her crew were rescued by the brig Sussex and paddle steamer Ramona (both United Kingdom).

== 23 February ==
List of shipwrecks: 23 February 1844
Ship	State	Description
Elizabeth	United Kingdom	The ship was driven ashore in Stokes Bay. She was refloated.
Farmer	United Kingdom	The sloop was driven ashore and wrecked at Dundee, Forfarshire. Her crew were rescued.
John and Hannah's Endeavour	United Kingdom	The sloop was run down and sunk off Grimsby, Lincolnshire by the brig Prince Regent (United Kingdom). All on board were rescued by Prince Regent. John and Hannah's Endeavour was on a voyage from King's Lynn, Norfolk to Leeds or Wakefield, Yorkshire.
Leslie	United Kingdom	The schooner was driven ashore and wrecked at Johnshaven, Aberdeenshire with the loss of all hands.
Margaret	United States	The ship was wrecked on the Fish Reef Key. All on board were rescued. She was on a voyage from Savannah, Georgia to Nassau, Bahamas.
Mary and Margaret	United Kingdom	The ship was driven ashore near Aberdeen. She was refloated on 9 March and taken in to Aberdeen.
Mary Ann	United Kingdom	The ship was driven ashore north of Aberdeen with the loss of two of her crew. She was on a voyage from Stirling to Aberdeen.
Oswy	United Kingdom	The ship was driven ashore at Worthing, Sussex. She was refloated on 4 March and taken in to Littlehampton, Sussex.
Primrose	United Kingdom	The sloop was driven ashore north of Bridlington, Yorkshire. Her crew were rescued. She was refloated on 3 March and taken in to Bridlington.
Stour	United Kingdom	The ship was holed by her anchor and sank at Littlehampton, West Sussex. She was on a voyage from Newport, Monmouthshire to Shoreham-by-Sea, Sussex. She was later raised.
Sussex	United Kingdom	The ship was driven ashore east of Porthcawl, Glamorgan. She was on a voyage from Lisbon, Portugal to Bristol, Gloucestershire. She was refloated on 6 March.
Swan	United Kingdom	The sloop struck a sunken rock in the Strait of Lungha and sank. Her crew were rescued. She was on a voyage from Oban, Argyllshire to Liverpool, Lancashire.
Union	(United Kingdom of Great Britain and Ireland) Antigua	The drogher, a sloop, was wrecked at Montserrat.
Willing Maid	United Kingdom	The yawl capsized at Scarborough. Her crew survived.

== 24 February ==
List of shipwrecks: 24 February 1844
Ship	State	Description
Ann	United Kingdom	The schooner was driven ashore and wrecked 9 nautical miles (17 km) south of Whitby, Yorkshire with the loss of all hands. She was on a voyage from London to Perth.
Ann and Margaret	United Kingdom	The brig was driven ashore at Aberdeen with the loss of two of her crew. Survivors were rescued by the Aberdeen Lifeboat.
Arthur	United Kingdom	The ship was driven ashore at Havre de Grâce, Seine-Inférieure, France. She was on a voyage from Sunderland, County Durham to Caen, Calvados, France. She was later refloated and taken in to Havre de Grâce.
Caledonia	United Kingdom	The schooner was wrecked at Rosehearty, Aberdeenshire. Her crew were rescued. She was on a voyage from London to Inverness.
Dispatch	United Kingdom	The ship sank off Black Head. Her crew were rescued. She was on a voyage from Ayr to Strangford, County Antrim.
Emulous	United Kingdom	The yawl capsized and sank at Scarborough, Yorkshire with the loss of all hands.
Endeavour	United Kingdom	The ship was driven ashore and wrecked at Tynemouth, Northumberland. Her crew were rescued by a lifeboat. She was on a voyage from Middlesbrough, Yorkshire to Faversham, Kent.
Esperance	France	The ship was driven ashore near Gravelines, Nord. Her crew were rescued.
Evadne	United Kingdom	The schooner ran aground on the Herd Sand, in the North Sea off the coast of County Durham. Her crew were rescued by a lifeboat. She was on a voyage from North Shields, County Durham to London. Evadne was subsequently driven ashore and wrecked at Tynemouth Castle
Francis and Mary	United Kingdom	The sloop was driven ashore at Seaton, County Durham. She was on a voyage from Hartlepool, County Durham to Swanage, Dorset.
Frances Mary	United Kingdom	The brig foundered in the North Sea off Whitby.
Gillmerton	United Kingdom	The ship ran aground on the Navestone Rocks, off the Farne Islands, Northumberland and was abandoned by her crew. She floated off and consequently foundered. Gillmerton was on a voyage from Montrose, Forfarshire to London.
Jerome	United Kingdom	The yawl capsized and sank at Scarborough with the loss of all hands.
Magdalene	United Kingdom	The ship was driven ashore west of North Berwick, Berwickshire. Her crew were rescued. She was on a voyage from Dunbar, Lothian to the Clyde.
Mayflower	United Kingdom	The ship ran aground at Seaham, County Durham. She was on a voyage from Seaham to King's Lynn, Norfolk. She was refloated and put in to Hartlepool, County Durham.
Owen Glendower	United Kingdom	The ship was driven ashore at Schulau. Her crew were rescued. She was on a voyage from Hawrich, Essex to Hamburg. She was refloated on 23 February and taken into Schulau.
Pontefract	United Kingdom	The ship was driven ashore near Seaton, County Durham.
Ruby	United Kingdom	The sloop was driven ashore and wrecked at Freswick, Caithness with the loss of two of her six crew. She was on a voyage from Aberdeen to Ballachulish, Argyllshire.
Susan	United Kingdom	The ship was driven ashore and severely damaged in Oxwich Bay. Her crew were rescued. She was on a voyage from Bristol, Gloucestershire to Llanelly, Glamorgan. She was refloated on 6 March and taken in to Llanelly, Glamorgan for repairs.
Thomas and William	United Kingdom	The ship was driven ashore and wrecked at Wainfleet, Lincolnshire. Her crew were rescued.
Undine	United Kingdom	The ship was driven ashore at Seaton, County Durham.
Unicorn	United Kingdom	The schooner was driven ashore and wrecked at Tynemouth Castle with the loss of a crew member. She was on a voyage from South Shields, County Durham to Great Yarmouth, Norfolk.
William	United Kingdom	The brig ran aground on the Herd Sand. Her crew were rescued by rocket apparatus. She was on a voyage from Arbroath, Forfarshire to London. She became a wreck on 4 March.
Willing Mind	United Kingdom	The yawl was wrecked at Scarborough. Her crew survived.

== 25 February ==
List of shipwrecks: 25 February 1844
Ship	State	Description
Ann	United Kingdom	The brig was driven ashore and wrecked at Stainton, Yorkshire.
Ceres	United Kingdom	The ship was driven ashore near Newbiggin, Northumberland.
Charlotte Louise	Bremen	The brig ran aground on the Hammelwarden, in the North Sea. She was on a voyage from Bremen to Greenland. She was refloated on 3 March and taken into Brake, Kingdom of Hanover.
Echo	France	The brig ran aground on the Gadges and was damaged. She was on a voyage from Dunkerque, Nord to Cette, Hérault. She was refloated and put in to Falmouth, Cornwall, United Kingdom.
Estafette	Flag unknown	The ship was driven ashore on Bornholm, Denmark. She was refloated and taken in to Rønne.
Fulger	France	The ship was wrecked on the Square Handkerchief Reefs, off the coast of Haiti. Her crew were rescued.
Glengarry	United Kingdom	The smack was driven ashore and wrecked in Freshwater Bay, Pembrokeshire. Her crew were rescued.
Lady Harvey	United Kingdom	The ship was driven ashore north of Great Yarmouth, Norfolk. She was refloated on 5 March and taken into Great Yarmouth, where she sank. She was refloated on 7 March.
Margaret and Anna	United Kingdom	The ship was driven ashore and wrecked at Breaksea Point, Glamorgan.

== 26 February ==
List of shipwrecks: 26 February 1844
Ship	State	Description
Amity	United Kingdom	The ship was driven ashore near Sunderland, County Durham. She was refloated on 3 April and towed in to Sunderland.
Ann	United Kingdom	The schooner was driven ashore and damaged at Carrigart, County Donegal. She was on a voyage from Sligo to Glasgow, Renfrewshire. Ann was refloated on 3 March and taken in to Carrigart.
Constantia	United Kingdom	The brig was driven ashore and damaged near Ryhope, County Durham.
Enterprise	United Kingdom	The sloop was wrecked on the Salthouse Bank, in the Irish Sea 4 nautical miles (7.4 km) west of Lytham St. Annes, Lancashire. Her crew survived. She was on a voyage from Ulverston to Liverpool.
Fairy	United Kingdom	The ship was driven ashore at Overstrand, Norfolk. Her crew were rescued.
George	Hamburg	The ship was driven ashore on Scharhörn. She was on a voyage from La Guaira, Venezuela to Hamburg. She was refloated on 1 March and taken in to Cuxhaven.
Ionia	United Kingdom	The ship departed from Venice, Kingdom of Lombardy–Venetia for Falmouth, Cornwall. No further trace, presumed foundered with the loss of all hands.
Isis	United Kingdom	The ship was lost 12 nautical miles (22 km) from Wainfleet, Lincolnshire with the loss of all but her captain.
Jenny	United Kingdom	The ship foundered in the North Sea off Redcar, Yorkshire with the loss of all hands.
Newcastle	United Kingdom	The ship sank off Aberdeen. All on board were rescued by the paddle steamer Duke of Wellington (United Kingdom).
Spray	United Kingdom	The schooner was wrecked on the Gaa Sand, in the River Tay Estuary in a snow storm, with the loss of two of her seven crew. She was on a voyage from Hartlepool, County Durham to Dundee, Forfarshire with coals.
Symmetry	United Kingdom	The ship ran aground on a reef off the Isle of Pines, Cuba and was damaged. She was on a voyage from Liverpool, Lancashire to Mobile, Alabama, United States. She was refloated and completed her voyage, arriving on 8 March.
Thistle	United Kingdom	The ship was driven ashore at Rothesay, Bute and was abandoned by her crew. She was on a voyage from Leith, Lothian to Belfast, County Antrim.
York Union	United Kingdom	The ship was beached south of Winterton-on-Sea, Norfolk. She was on a voyage from London to Goole, Yorkshire. She was refloated on 1 March and taken in to Great Yarmouth, Norfolk.

== 27 February ==
List of shipwrecks: 27 February 1844
Ship	State	Description
Blackbird	United Kingdom	The brig was wrecked on the Wellheugh Rocks, on the coast of Northumberland with the loss of a crew member.
Brack	United Kingdom	The ship was driven ashore south of Hartlepool, County Durham.
Carlisle	United Kingdom	The ship was driven ashore south of Hartlepool. She was refloated on 2 March and taken in to Hartlepool.
Choice	United Kingdom	The ship was driven ashore south of Hartlepool. She was refloated on 4 March and towed in to South Shields, County Durham.
City of Carlisle	United Kingdom	The steamship was wrecked on the Dog Head Sand, in the North Sea off the coast of Lincolnshire. Her fourteen crew were rescued by the Skegness Lifeboat. She was on a voyage from Goole, Yorkshire to Honfleur, Calvados, France.
Deux Emilies	France	The ship was wrecked near Almería, Spain. She was on a voyage from "Gigon" to Adra, Spain.
Eliza	United Kingdom	The ship was driven ashore south of Hartlepool.
Elizabeth	United Kingdom	The ship was in collision with Tally-ho (United Kingdom) and was abandoned in Almería Bay with the loss of seven of her crew. Survivors were rescued by Tally-ho. Elisabeth subsequently came ashore and was wrecked between Almería and Cape de Gatt She was on a voyage from Cephalonia, United States of the Ionian Islands to Leith, Lothian.
Fancy	United Kingdom	The ship was wrecked between Almería and Cape de Gatt. Her crew were rescued. She was on a voyage from Livorno, Grand Duchy of Tuscany to Dublin.
Felicity	United Kingdom	The ship was driven ashore south of Hartlepool. She was refloated on 2 March and taken in to Hartlepool.
George	United Kingdom	The ship was driven ashore south of Hartlepool. She was refloated on 2 March and taken in to Hartlepool.
Giraffe	France	The ship was wrecked near Almería. She was on a voyage from Cette, Hérault to Nantes, Loire-Inférieure.
Hope	United Kingdom	The ship was driven ashore south of Hartlepool. She was refloated on 2 March and taken in to Hartlepool.
Isis	United Kingdom	The ship was wrecked at Mumby, Lincolnshire with the loss of all hands. She was on a voyage from Ipswich, Suffolk to "Fradrington Bridge".
Joven Clarita	Spain	The ship was wrecked near Almería.
Lark	United Kingdom	The ship was driven ashore and wrecked south of Hartlepool. Her four crew were rescued by the Seaton Carew Lifeboat.
Lime	United Kingdom	The ship was driven ashore south of Hartlepool.
Lord Howick	United Kingdom	The ship was driven ashore and severely damaged at Kessingland, Suffolk. She was refloated on 29 February and taken into Lowestoft, Suffolk.
Majestic	United Kingdom	The ship ran aground in Derbyhaven Bay and was severely damaged. She was on a voyage from Marseille, Bouches-du-Rhône, France to the Clyde. She was refloated and put in to Castletown, Isle of Man.
New Eagle	United Kingdom	The ship ran aground on the Newarp Sand, in the North Sea. She was on a voyage from Stockton-on-Tees, County Durham to Almería, Spain. She was refloated and put in to Ramsgate, Kent in a leaky condition.
Ninus	United Kingdom	The ship was driven ashore south of Hartlepool. She was refloated on 4 March and taken in to Stockton-on-Tees.
Noah's Ark	United Kingdom	The ship was driven ashore south of Hartlepool.
Ondine	United Kingdom	The ship was driven ashore south of Hartlepool.
Palermo	Kingdom of the Two Sicilies	The ship was wrecked near Almería. She was on a voyage from Palma di Montechiaro to Havana, Cuba.
Pontefract	United Kingdom	The ship was driven ashore at Seaton, County Durham. She was refloated on 4 March and taken in to Stockton-on-Tees.
Robert and William	United Kingdom	The ship was driven ashore at Hunstanton, Norfolk. She was refloated on 1 March and taken in to Wells-next-the-Sea.
Rosehaugh	United Kingdom	The ship was driven ashore south of Hartlepool. She was refloated on 2 March and taken in to Hartlepool.
Sarah	United Kingdom	The ship was driven ashore at Corton, Suffolk. She was on a voyage from Goole, Yorkshire to London.
Scipio	Flag unknown	The ship was driven ashore at Cartagena, Spain. She was refloated and put under repair.
Sisters	United Kingdom	The ship was driven ashore west of Burnham Overy Staithe, Norfolk. Her crew were rescued. She was refloated on 3 March.
Tito	Spain	The ship was driven ashore near Vigo. Her crew were rescued. She was on a voyage from Rio de Janeiro, Brazil to Cádiz.
Two Friends	United Kingdom	The ship was driven ashore west of Wells-next-the-Sea, Norfolk. Her crew were rescued. She was refloated on 3 March and resumed her voyage.
Union	United Kingdom	The ship was driven ashore and wrecked at Almería, Spain, Her crew were rescued.
Unity	United Kingdom	The ship was driven ashore south of Hartlepool.

== 28 February ==
List of shipwrecks: 28 February 1844
Ship	State	Description
Ann Jenny	United Kingdom	The sloop foundered in the North Sea with the loss of all seven crew.
Ayrshire	United Kingdom	The ship was driven ashore in Spruce Bay, Bahamas. She was on a voyage from Mobile, Alabama, United States to Liverpool, Lancashire. She was consequently condemned.
Mary	United Kingdom	The brig was driven ashore at St. Andrews, Fife. Her eight crew were rescued. She was on a voyage from South Shields, County Durham to London.
Reliance	United Kingdom	The ship was wrecked near "Manculla", 80 leagues (240 nautical miles (440 km) north east of Aden. She was on a voyage from Aden to Moulmein.
Two Friends	(United Kingdom of Great Britain and Ireland) Jersey	The ship ran aground on the Colorados, off the coast of Cuba. Her crew were rescued. She was on a voyage from Newport, Monmouthshire to Havana, Cuba. Two Friends was boarded on 6 March by the crew of John Blake (United Kingdom), which had also been wrecked on the Colorados. She was refloated and sailed to Dartmouth, Devon, where she arrived on 20 April.

== 29 February ==
List of shipwrecks: 29 February 1844
Ship	State	Description
HMS Creole	Royal Navy	The schooner was wrecked off Port Morant, Jamaica.
Enterprise	United Kingdom	The ship ran aground in the River Welland. She was on a voyage from Boston, Lincolnshire to London.
Huntington	United Kingdom	The ship ran aground at Westport, County Mayo.
Neptune	United Kingdom	The ship was driven ashore on Orcombe Point, Devon. She was on a voyage from Weymouth, Dorset to Plymouth, Devon. She was refloated and taken into Exmouth, Devon in a leaky condition.
Runcina	United Kingdom	The ship ran aground on the Barber Sand, in the North Sea off the coast of Norfolk. She was on a voyage from Portsoy, Aberdeenshire to London. She was refloated on 1 March and resumed her voyage.

== Unknown date ==
List of shipwrecks: Unknown date in February 1844
Ship	State	Description
Aquatic	United Kingdom	The schooner ran aground on the Cutler Sand, in the North Sea off the coast of Suffolk. She was on a voyage from Hull, Yorkshire to London.
Aurora	Netherlands	The ship was driven ashore near Workington, Cumberland, United Kingdom. She was refloated on 4 February and taken in to Maryport, Cumberland.
Bridget	United Kingdom	The ship was abandoned in the Atlantic Ocean. Her crew were rescued by Canton (United States). Bridget was on a voyage from Saint John, New Brunswick, British North America to Carmarthen.
Confidence	United States	The fishing schooner was lost on the Georges Bank, possibly on the 28th. Lost with all 7 hands.
Eunomica	Denmark	The schooner was driven ashore east of Calais, France. She was refloated on 8 February.
Farmer's Friend	United Kingdom	The ship was driven ashore on Selsey Bill, Sussex. She was refloated on 29 February and taken into Emsworth, Hampshire.
Father Mathew	(United Kingdom of Great Britain and Ireland) British North America	The ship ran aground off "Ceasar's Creek". She was on a voyage from St. Stephen, New Brunswick to Matanzas, Cuba. She was refloated and taken into Key West, Florida Territory.
Gleaner	United States	The brig was abandoned in the Atlantic Ocean before 22 February. She was on a voyage from Rotterdam, South Holland, Netherlands to Boston, Massachusetts.
Grace Darling	United Kingdom	The ship was lost at "Tobasco" in early February.
Joseph McCullogh	(United Kingdom of Great Britain and Ireland) British North America	The ship was wrecked at Martinique. She was on a voyage from Guadeloupe to Charleston, South Carolina, United States.
Maria	France	The ship was wrecked at St. Ubes, Portugal before 25 February. She was on a voyage from Dunkirk, Nord to St. Ubes.
Norval	United Kingdom	The ship was driven ashore and wrecked at Prampram, Gold Coast.
Premier	France	The ship was driven ashore on "Sapenze Island". She was on a voyage from Constantinople, Ottoman Empire to Marseille, Bouches-du-Rhône. She was refloated.
Semaphore	France	The ship departed from Dunkerque, Nord for Marseille. No further trace, presumed foundered with the loss of all hands.
Sophia	Flag unknown	The ship was driven ashore at Brindisi, Kingdom of the Two Sicilies before 18 February. She was on a voyage from Trieste to Smyrna, Ottoman Empire.
Victoria	United Kingdom	The steamship was destroyed by fire at Banagher, County Offaly before 14 February.
William and Nancy	United Kingdom	The ship ran aground on the Sunk Sand, in the North Sea off the coast of Essex. She floated off but consequently sank.
William Fulcher	United Kingdom	The ship was driven ashore and severely damaged at Negapatam, India. She was on a voyage from Bordeaux, Gironde, France to Madras, India. She was refloated but was consequently condemned.
