= Robert Mascall =

15th-century Bishop of Hereford

Robert Mascall, O.Carm
- Bishop of Hereford
- Appointed: 2 July 1404
- Term ended: 22 December 1416
- Predecessor: Thomas Trevenant
- Successor: Edmund Lacey

Orders
- Consecration: 6 July 1404

Personal details
- Born: Ludlow, Shropshire
- Died: 22 December 1416
- Denomination: Roman Catholic Church

Robert Mascall (or Maschal) (died 22 December 1416) was a medieval Carmelite friar who served as the Bishop of Hereford from 1404 to 1416.

Mascall was born at Ludlow, Shropshire, where at an early age he became a Carmelite friar. He was educated at the University of Oxford, gaining a distinction in philosophy and theology. Probably in 1400, King Henry IV appointed Mascall his confessor.

Mascall was appointed the Bishop of the Diocese of Hereford by papal provision on 2 July and consecrated on 6 July 1404. He received possession of the temporalities of the See of Hereford on 25 September 1404.

Mascall died in office on 22 December 1416.

== Citations ==
Catholic Church titles
Preceded by Thomas Trevenant	Bishop of Hereford; 1404–1416	Succeeded by Edmund Lacey
