= Simon de Brantingham =

English noble

Steward of the Hospital of St John the Baptist
- In office ? – 6 July 1360
- Monarch: Edward III
- Succeeded by: Thomas de Brantingham

Personal details
- Children: Walter

Simon de Brantingham was an English noble of the mid-fourteenth century. During the reign of Edward III, de Brantingham held the stewardship of the Hospital of St John the Baptist in Dorchester, Dorset, although his involvement in the embezzlement and wanton disposal of the hospital's assets resulted in his replacement by Thomas de Brantingham in 1360.

== Stewardship of the Hospital of St John the Baptist ==
De Brantingham was implicated in the wasteful and destructive administration of the Hospital of St John the Baptist in Dorchester, which had suffered the alienation of so much of its land that it was no longer capable of almsgiving. A royal inquiry, commissioned by writ of 18 November 1359, headed by the county escheator and with a jury empanelled to hear the findings, found that de Brantingham, then steward of the hospital, had not only alienated land but also carried off chattels from the hospital, including linens and bedding. Shortly after the commission reached its finding, de Brantingham appears to have been dismissed and, in any event, the following year, as recorded in the patent rolls for 6 June 1360, King Edward III granted the stewardship of the hospital to Thomas de Brantingham.

== Legal duties ==
De Brantingham and his son, Walter, appear as a witness to the grant, on 2 July 1324, of a messuage and appurtenances on the high street in Beverley, between Margaret, widow of Walter de Brychton of Beverley, and Roger Northiby of Walkington.

== Bibliography ==
- "BC/III/2/3", Beverley Borough Records, East Riding of Yorkshire County Council.
- Page, William, ed. (1908). "Hospitals: Dorchester". A History of the County of Dorset. Victoria County History. Vol. 2. pp. 101–103.
