= John Pridden =

John Pridden (3 January 1758–5 April 1825) was an English cleric and antiquary.

== Life ==
The eldest son of John Pridden, a bookseller of Ludgate Hill and friend of Joseph Brasbridge, by his wife Anne, daughter of Humphrey Gregory of Whitchurch, Shropshire, he was born in London on 3 January 1758. He entered St Paul's School, London on 3 August 1764, aged 7, and went on 15 April 1777 to The Queen's College, Oxford. He graduated B.A. in 1781, and was ordained soon after, and was incorporated M.A. at St. John's College, Cambridge.

Pridden was successively afternoon lecturer at Tavistock Chapel, London (1782), minor canon of St Paul's Cathedral (November 1782), and vicar of Heybridge, Essex (July 1783). He was curate (from 1783 to 1803) of St. Bride's, Fleet Street, where the rector was non-resident; vicar of Little Wakering, Essex (1788); chaplain to Earl Powlett (1789); priest in ordinary of his majesty's Chapel Royal (1795); and minor canon of Westminster Abbey. He was vicar of Caddington, Bedfordshire, from 1797, when he resigned his Essex livings; and finally was rector of the united parishes of St. George, Botolph Lane, and St. Botolph, Bishopsgate.

Excursions into architecture resulted in a design for the sea-bathing infirmary at Margate, of which Pridden was joint founder with John Coakley Lettsom, and for many years honorary secretary; a new vicarage at Caddington in 1812, and a plan for joining Snow Hill and Holborn Hill, which he submitted to the Corporation of London.

Pridden died on 5 April 1825, aged 67, at his house in Fleet Street, and was buried on 12 April at St Mary's, Islington, beside his first wife.

== Works ==
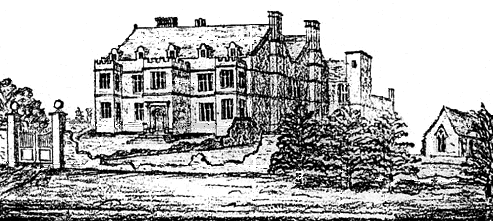
Cranham Hall, 1789 drawing by John Pridden, before it was rebuilt

Pridden was an antiquary and an amateur artist, as well as an architect. He was elected fellow of the Society of Antiquaries of London in 1785. To the Bibliotheca Topographica Britannica he contributed Appendix to the History of Reculver and Herne (1787) and drawings, particularly illustrating the Leicestershire collections of his father-in-law John Nichols. His major antiquarian achievement was the continuation of the index and glossary to the Rolls of Parliament, which had been started by John Strachey. On this he spent thirty years. It was completed by Edward Upham, and published in 1832, London.

== Family ==
His first wife, Anne, was daughter of John Nichols. His second wife, also Anne, daughter of Robert Pickwood of London, survived him. He had no issue.

== Notes ==
Attribution

This article incorporates text from a publication now in the public domain: Lee, Sidney, ed. (1896). "Pridden, John". Dictionary of National Biography. Vol. 46. London: Smith, Elder & Co.
