= List of shipwrecks in March 1844 =

The list of shipwrecks in March 1844 includes ships sunk, foundered, wrecked, grounded, or otherwise lost during March 1844.

== 1 March ==
List of shipwrecks: 1 March 1844
Ship	State	Description
Expedition	United Kingdom	The ship ran aground on the Polesand Bank, in the North Sea off the coast of Northumberland. She was on a voyage from Tynemouth, Northumberland to Gloucester. She was refloated and resumed her voyage.
Fama	United Kingdom	The ship was wrecked on the Pallister Reef, south east of Barbuda. Her crew were rescued.
Lucy	United Kingdom	The ship was driven ashore on Antigua. She was refloated on 5 March.
Marys	United Kingdom	The ship was driven ashore on Nevis. She was consequently condemned.
Petrel	United Kingdom	The ship was driven ashore on Antigua.
Success	United Kingdom	The sloop was driven ashore and wrecked on Gigha, Inner Hebrides.

== 2 March ==
List of shipwrecks: 2 March 1844
Ship	State	Description
Adonis	United Kingdom	The ship was wrecked at the mouth of the Rhône with some loss of life. She was on a voyage from Gibraltar to Marseille, Bouches-du-Rhône and Genoa, Kingdom of Sardinia.
Auguste	France	The ship departed from Calcutta, India for Havre de Grâce, Seine-Inférieure. No further trace, presumed foundered with the loss of all hands.
Ayrshire	United Kingdom	The ship was lost in the Hanover Sound. Her crew were rescued. She was on a voyage from Mobile, Alabama, United States to Liverpool, Lancashire.
Countess of Eglington	United Kingdom	The ship ran aground and was damaged at Saint Thomas, Virgin Islands. She was on a voyage from the Clyde to Saint Thomas. She was refloated the next day.
Deux Freres	France	The ship foundered in the North Sea between the mouths of the Elbe and Weser.
John	United Kingdom	The ship ran aground and was damaged at Shoreham-by-Sea, Sussex. She was refloated and taken in to Shoreham-by-Sea in a leaky condition.
Peace	United Kingdom	The ship ran aground on the Sunk Sand, in the North Sea off the coast of Essex. She was on a voyage from London to Sunderland, County Durham. She was refloated and put in to Harwich, Essex in a leaky condition.

== 3 March ==
List of shipwrecks: 3 March 1844
Ship	State	Description
Gabrielle	France	The ship was wrecked east of Calais. Her crew were rescued. She was on a voyage from Marseille, Bouches-du-Rhône to Dunkirk, Nord.
Martha and Mary	United Kingdom	The ship ran aground on the Oosterard, in the North Sea off the coast of Zeeland, Netherlands and was wrecked. Her crew were rescued. She was on a voyage from Liverpool, Lancashire to Rotterdam, South Holland, Netherlands.
Merlin	United Kingdom	The ship was wrecked in the English Channel off the coast of Seine-Inférieure, France.
Nautilus	(United Kingdom of Great Britain and Ireland) New South Wales	The ship was wrecked at the mouth of the Richmond River. She was on a voyage from the Richmond River to Sydney.
Rebecca and Elizabeth	United Kingdom	The ship ran aground on the Barber Sand, in the North Sea off the coast of Norfolk. She was on a voyage from South Shields, County Durham to London. Rebecca and Elizabeth was refloated and put in to Great Yarmouth, Norfolk.
Tadmor	United Kingdom	The ship was wrecked on Indian Point, Nova Scotia, British North America. Her crew were rescued.
Teresa	Spain	The ship ran aground on the Cebezuela. She was on a voyage from Cádiz to Havana, Cuba.

== 4 March ==
List of shipwrecks: 4 March 1844
Ship	State	Description
Alcide	France	The ship capsized 3 nautical miles (5.6 km) west of "Pointre au Nez".
Haldee	(United Kingdom of Great Britain and Ireland) British North America	The ship was wrecked at Saint-Pierre, Martinique.
Juno	Hamburg	The ship was driven ashore at Cuxhaven. She was on a voyage from Messina, Sicily to Hamburg. She was refloated the next day.
Mary	United Kingdom	The schooner was driven ashore in Algoa Bay.
Republic	Bremen	The ship was driven ashore at Charleston, South Carolina United States. She was on a voyage from Charleston to Bremen.

== 5 March ==
List of shipwrecks: 5 March 1844
Ship	State	Description
Countess Cassilis	United Kingdom	The ship was driven ashore at Rough Island, County Down. She was on a voyage from Newry, County Antrim to Workington, Cumberland.
Eole	France	The ship was driven ashore near the "Brecquet Lighthouse", Côtes-du-Nord. She was refloated.
Royal Oak	United Kingdom	The ship ran aground on the Shoots and was damaged. She was on a voyage from Chepstow, Monmouthshire to Neath, Glamorgan. She was later refloated and resumed her voyage.

== 6 March ==
List of shipwrecks: 6 March 1844
Ship	State	Description
Active	United Kingdom	The schooner ran aground on a reef 4 nautical miles (7.4 km) downstream of "Mulroy".
Courier	United Kingdom	The ship ran aground on the Chapman Sand, in Belfast Lough. She was on a voyage from Belfast, County Antrim to London. She was later refloated.
John Blake	United Kingdom	The ship was wrecked on the Colorados, off the coast of Cuba. Her crew survived. The took to the boats and reached the Two Friends ( (United Kingdom of Great Britain and Ireland) Jersey), which had run aground on 28 February. She was refloated and sailed to Dartmouth, Devon, where she arrived on 20 April.
Rosalie	France	The sloop was driven ashore near Schulau, Duchy of Schleswig.
Thisbe	United Kingdom	The ship ran aground on the Lafolle Reef. Her crew were rescued. She was on a voyage from London to Jamaica. She was subsequently set afire and burnt.

== 7 March ==
List of shipwrecks: 7 March 1844
Ship	State	Description
Jacobina	Belgium	The ship ran aground on the Zoutelande Bank, in the North Sea off the coast of Zeeland, Netherlands. She was on a voyage from Antwerp to Amsterdam, North Holland, Netherlands.
Margaretha	Netherlands	The ship departed from Cardiff, Glamorgan, United Kingdom for Dordrecht, South Holland. No further trace, presumed foundered with the loss of all hands.
Traveller	United Kingdom	The ship struck rocks at Penzance, Cornwall and was damaged. She was on a voyage from Padstow to Penzance.

== 8 March ==
List of shipwrecks: 8 March 1844
Ship	State	Description
Expert	United Kingdom	The ship was wrecked on the west coast of the Isle of Mull, Inner Hebrides. Her crew were rescued. She was on a voyage from Dublin to South Shields, County Durham.
Friends	United Kingdom	The ship departed from Sligo for Runcorn, Cheshire. No further trace, presumed foundered with the loss of all hands.
Henrietta	United Kingdom	The ship foundered in Liverpool Bay off the Crosby Lightship ( Trinity House). Her crew were rescued.
Industry	United Kingdom	The ship was driven ashore in Dundrum Bay. She was on a voyage from Aberdovey, Merionethshire to Strangford, County Antrim.
Onderneeming	(Denmark) Duchy of Schleswig	The ship departed from Texel, North Holland for Hull, Yorkshire, United Kingdom. No further trace, presumed foundered in the North Sea with the loss of all hands. She was on a voyage from Kampen to Hull.
Peace and Plenty	United Kingdom	The smack was driven ashore in Dundrum Bay. She was on a voyage from Drogheda, County Louth to a Scottish port.
Symmetry	United Kingdom	The ship collided with Elizabeth Adnett (United Kingdom) and was abandoned in the North Sea off Sunderland, County Durham. Her crew were rescued by Elizabeth Adnett.

== 9 March ==
List of shipwrecks: 9 March 1844
Ship	State	Description
Achieve	United Kingdom	The ship was driven ashore and wrecked at Drummond Point, Renfrewshire. Her crew were rescued She was on a voyage from Sligo to Glasgow, Renfrewshire.
Ann	United Kingdom	The ship foundered in the North Sea off Whitby, Yorkshire. Her crew were rescued by Vesta (United Kingdom. Ann was on a voyage from South Shields, County Durham to London.
Aurora	United Kingdom	The ship was driven ashore at Troon, Ayrshire. She was on a voyage from Amlwch, Anglesey to Troon.
Betty's Delight	United Kingdom	The ship was sighted off Robin Hoods Bay, Yorkshire. No further trace, presumed foundered with the loss of all hands. She was on a voyage from South Shields to Rouen, Seine-Inférieure, France.
Brake	Bremen	The pilot cutter was driven ashore at Bremerhaven.
Clitus	United Kingdom	The ship was driven ashore at Troon.
Eclipse	United Kingdom	The ship was driven ashore in the Clyde. She was on a voyage from Glasgow to Gibraltar. She was refloated and towed in to Greenock, Renfrewshire.
George Canning	United Kingdom	The ship sprang a leak in the North Sea and was beached at the Flamborough Head Lighthouse, Yorkshire, where she was wrecked. Her crew were rescued. She was on a voyage from South Shields to London.
Grace Gillespie	United Kingdom	The smack was driven ashore at Troon.
Greyhound	United Kingdom	The ship sank in the Islands of Fleet. Her crew were rescued. She was refloated on 15 March.
Hopewell	United Kingdom	The ship was driven ashore at Redcar, Yorkshire. Her crew were rescued. She was on a voyage from Whitby, Yorkshire to Stockton-on-Tees, County Durham. She was refloated on 25 March and taken in to Whitby.
Industry	United Kingdom	The smack was driven ashore at Troon.
Industry	United Kingdom	The brig was driven ashore at Irvine, Ayrshire.
Isabella; Preston	United Kingdom	The schooner Isabella was driven into the galiot Preston at Troon. Both vessels were then driven ashore.
James	United Kingdom	The brig was driven ashore at Irvine.
Reform	United Kingdom	The ship was foundered in the North Sea 30 nautical miles (56 km) off the coast of Norfolk. Her crew were rescued by the fishing smack Peerless (United Kingdom). Reform was on a voyage from Maldon, Essex to Leeds of Wakefield, Yorkshire.
Theresa	United Kingdom	The brig was destroyed by fire in Mutton Cove, Devon with the loss of two lives.
William and Betty	United Kingdom	The sloop was driven ashore at Troon.

== 10 March ==
List of shipwrecks: March 1844
Ship	State	Description
Frau Etta	Hamburg	The ship was wrecked at Ottendorf, Duchy of Schleswig. she was on a voyage from Bremen to Hamburg.
Geerdina	Bremen	The ship was driven ashore near Cuxhaven. She was on a voyage from Bremen to Hamburg. She was refloated and taken into Cuxhaven.
Giorgio	Kingdom of the Two Sicilies	The ship was driven ashore at Carn, Ireland. She was on a voyage from Liverpool, Lancashire, United Kingdom to Palermo. She had become a wreck by 17 March.
John	United Kingdom	The sloop was abandoned in the River Mersey.
Lune	United Kingdom	The ship foundered north east of the Isle of Man. Her four crew survived. She was on a voyage from Glasgow, Renfrewshire to Workington, Cumberland or from Greenock, Renfrewshire to Glasson Dock, Lancashire.
Magnet	United Kingdom	The sloop was driven ashore and wrecked near "Redness Point", Cumberland. Both crew were rescued. She was on a voyage from Douglas, Isle of Man to Workington, Cumberland.
Petit Rouennais	France	The steamship collided with another vessel and ran aground on the Tot Bank, in the English Channel. She was refloated with the assistance of the steamship Robert (France).
Placidia	United Kingdom	The ship ran aground at Scalby, Yorkshire and was damaged. She was on a voyage from Seaham, County Durham to London. She was refloated and taken in to Scarborough, Yorkshire.
Veloce	Kingdom of Sardinia	The ship was wrecked at the mouth of the Danube.

== 11 March ==
List of shipwrecks: 11 March 1844
Ship	State	Description
Active	United Kingdom	The ship was driven ashore north of Maryport, Cumberland. She was on a voyage from Belfast, County Antrim to Maryport.
Active	Flag unknown	The ship ran aground off the Belgian coast and was consequently beached at Knokke, West Flanders, where she was wrecked. Her crew were rescued. She was on a voyage from St Ubes, Portugal to Ostend, West Flanders.
Aimée Catherine	France	The ship ran aground on the Tot Bank, in the English Channel. She was refloated on 17 March.
Ann	United Kingdom	The ship was abandoned in the North Sea off the Newarp Lightship ( Trinity House). Her crew were rescued by the fishing smack Rising Sun (United Kingdom).
City of York	United Kingdom	The brig was abandoned in the Atlantic Ocean (50°38′N 10°25′W). Her crew were rescued by the brig Sarah Ann (United Kingdom).
Conception	Sweden	The ship was driven ashore and wrecked at Lillesand, Norway. Her crew were rescued. She was on a voyage from Bahia, Brazil to Stockholm.
Despatch	United Kingdom	The smack foundered at the mouth of the River Usk with the loss of a crew member.
Leonie	France	The ship ran aground on the Roque, in the English Channel. She was on a voyage from Bordeaux, Gironde to Rouen, Seine-Inférieure. She was refloated but then came ashore at Quillebeuf-sur-Seine, Eure. She was again refloated.
Lovely	United Kingdom	The sloop sprang a leak and was beached at Great Orme Head, Caernarfonshire. She was on a voyage from Liverpool, Lancashire to Youghal, County Cork.
Matilda	United Kingdom	The smack foundered at the mouth of the River Usk. Her crew were rescued. She was refloated on 17 March and towed in to Newport, Monmouthshire.
Ocean	United Kingdom	The ship was driven ashore in the "Sucker".
Pilot	United Kingdom	The smack foundered at the mouth of the River Usk. Her crew were rescued.

== 12 March ==
List of shipwrecks: 12 March 1844
Ship	State	Description
Aimable Société	France	The ship was driven ashore at De Panne, West Flanders, Belgium. Her crew were rescued.
Caroline	United Kingdom	The ship was driven ashore and wrecked on Saint Tuwal's Island West. At least sixteen of her 32 crew survived, with three confirmed dead. She was on a voyage from Liverpool, Lancashire to Africa. She was refloated on 16 April and taken in to Abersoch, Caernarfonshire for repairs.
Centaur	United Kingdom	The ship was driven ashore near "St. James's Castle". She was on a voyage from Smyrna, Ottoman Empire to Liverpool. She was refloated and resumed her voyage.
Charles	France	The ship was driven ashore east of Boulogne, Pas-de-Calais. Her crew were rescued. Charles was on a voyage from Rouen, Seine-Inférieure to Cette, Hérault. She became a wreck the next day.
Cosmopolite	Russia	The brig was capsized by ice in the Lillegrund, off the coast of Denmark.
Dispatch	United Kingdom	The smack foundered at the mouth of the River Usk. Her crew were rescued.
Jabez	United Kingdom	The smack was run ashore in the Solway Firth near the Southerness Lighthouse. She was on a voyage from Liverpool to Ballyshannon, County Donegal.
Jane Walker	United Kingdom	The ship sprang a leak and was abandoned in the Atlantic Ocean (38°00′N 64°40′W). Her 29 passengers and crew were rescued by Brothers (United Kingdom). Jane Walker was on a voyage from Saint John, New Brunswick, British North America to Liverpool.
John Denniston	United Kingdom	The barque was wrecked at Cape San Antonio, Cuba with the loss of four of her seventeen crew. She was on a voyage from Liverpool to Mobile, Alabama, United States.
Lark	United Kingdom	The ship sprang a leak and was run ashore at Ramsey, Isle of Man. She was on a voyage from Whitehaven, Cumberland to Dublin. She was refloated on 15 March and taken in to Ramsey.
Matilda	United Kingdom	The smack foundered at the mouth of the River Usk. Her crew were rescued.
Moriah	United Kingdom	The ship was run down and sunk in the North Sea by Evening Star (United Kingdom). Her crew were rescued. Moriah was on a voyage from Hull, Yorkshire to Sunderland, County Durham.
Nancy	United Kingdom	The ship sank in the River Mersey off Woodside, Cheshire. Her crew were rescued. She was on a voyage from Jersey, Channel Islands to Liverpool.
Petrel	United Kingdom	The ship was driven ashore at Antigua. She was on a voyage from the Clyde to Antigua. She was refloated on 26 March.
Pilot	United Kingdom	The smack foundered at the mouth of the River Usk. Her crew were rescued.
Raven	United Kingdom	The ship was holed by her anchor and sank at "Porthleidiog". She was on a voyage from Bangor, Caernarfonshire to Cardiff, Glamorgan. She was refloated on 16 March.
St. Joseph	France	The ship was driven ashore, capsized and sank at "Brekar Island". She was on a voyage from Paimpol, Côtes-du-Nord to Bordeaux, Gironde.

== 13 March ==
List of shipwrecks: 13 March 1844
Ship	State	Description
Abel Gower	United Kingdom	The ship was driven ashore at Corton, Suffolk. She was on a voyage from Berwick upon Tweed, Northumberland to Stockton-on-Tees, County Durham.
Amoy	United Kingdom	The ship was wrecked at the Sand Heads, India.
Ann	United Kingdom	The ship was driven ashore on Islay, Inner Hebrides. She was on a voyage from Inverness to Liverpool, Lancashire.
Commerce	United Kingdom	The ship was driven ashore on Islay.
Cygne	France	The ship ran aground off Aux Cayes, Haiti and was damaged. She was on a voyage from Aux Cayes to Marseille, Bouches-du-Rhône. She was refloated and taken in to Aux Cayes. She was consequently condemned.
Irene	France	The ship was wrecked at La Flotte, Charente-Maritime. Her crew survived. She was on a voyage from Bayonne, Basses-Pyrénées to Bordeaux, Gironde.
Lewisham	United Kingdom	The ship was driven ashore and wrecked at Holmen, Denmark. Her crew were rescued. She was on a voyage from Whitby, Yorkshire to a Baltic port. Lewisham had been refloated by 12 June.
Najade	Prussia	The brig was driven ashore at Provincetown, Massachusetts, United States. She was on a voyage from Boston, Massachusetts to New York. She was refloated on 15 March.
Roeffina Jettina	Hamburg	The ship was sunk by ice on the Kraut Sand. She was on a voyage from Ghent, East Flanders, Belgium to Hamburg.
Vigniron	France	The ship was wrecked at Figari, Corsica. She was on a voyage from Tunis, Beylik of Tunis to Marseille, Bouches-du-Rhône.

== 14 March ==
List of shipwrecks: 14 March 1844
Ship	State	Description
Bertha	United Kingdom	The ship was driven ashore at Hunstanton, Norfolk. She was on a voyage from Hartlepool, County Durham to King's Lynn, Norfolk.
Jessie Ritchie	United Kingdom	The ship was wrecked in the Canal de Rosario, off the coast of Cuba. She was on a voyage from Liverpool, Lancashire to Havana, Cuba.
Joseph and Mary	United Kingdom	The ship ran aground on the Spurn Sand, in the North Sea off the coast of Yorkshire. She was on a voyage from Woodbridge, Suffolk to Leeds, Yorkshire.
Susannah	United Kingdom	The ship was beached at Penzance, Cornwall. She was on a voyage from Charleston, South Carolina, United States to Bristol, Gloucestershire.
William and Mary	United Kingdom	The ship foundered at Kinsale, County Cork. She was on a voyage from Gloucester to city.

== 15 March ==
List of shipwrecks: 15 March 1844
Ship	State	Description
Alexander McNeel	United Kingdom	The sloop departed from Liverpool, Lancashire for Stranraer, Wigtownshire. Presumed subsequently foundered with the loss of all hands; a boat from the vessel was discovered between Maughold Head, Isle of Man and St Bees Head, Cumberland. Also reported as wrecked at Ramsey, Isle of Man in mid-March.
Chase	United Kingdom	The ship was driven ashore and wrecked in Cayton Bay. Her crew were rescued. She was on a voyage from London to Sunderland, County Durham. Chase was refloated on 4 April and taken in to Whitby, Yorkshire.
Elizabeth	United Kingdom	The smack was driven ashore at Magilligan, County Londonderry. She floated off and sank with the loss of one of her four crew. She was on a voyage from the River Clyde to Londonderry.
Emlyn; Friends	United Kingdom	The schooner Emlyn was in collision with Friends. Both vessels driven ashore together on the Stanton Sands, in the North Sea off the coast of County Durham. Their crews were rescued. Emlyn was refloated on 18 March and towed in to Hartlepool, County Durham. Friends was refloated on 20 March and put in to Whitby, Yorkshire for repairs.
Eston Nab	United Kingdom	The ship was driven ashore at Scarborough, Yorkshire. Her crew were rescued. She was on a voyage from London to Stockton-on-Tees, County Durham. She was refloated and taken in to Scarborough.
Johan Geraard	Netherlands	The ship ran aground on the Queens Sand. She was on a voyage from Rotterdam, South Holland to Belfast, County Antrim, United Kingdom. She was refloated and put into Ramsgate, Kent, United Kingdom in a leaky condition.
Margaret	United Kingdom	The smack was driven ashore at Greencastle, County Donegal. She was on a voyage from Wick, Caithness to Liverpool, Lancashire. She was refloated and taken in to Londonderry.
Petrel	United Kingdom	The ship was driven ashore in Caxton Bay. She was on a voyage from Montrose, Forfarshire to London.
Zeepferd	Netherlands	The ship foundered in the North Sea (52°00′N 3°23′W). Her crew were rescued. She was on a voyage from Dordrecht, South Holland to Liverpool, Lancashire, United Kingdom.

== 16 March ==
List of shipwrecks: March 1844
Ship	State	Description
Active	United Kingdom	The schooner was driven ashore 2 nautical miles (3.7 km) north of Drogheda, County Louth. Her crew were rescued. She was on a voyage from Belfast, County Antrim to Drogheda. She became a wreck on 18 March.
Agnes	United Kingdom	The schooner was driven ashore and wrecked at Kingstown, County Dublin. Her crew survived.
Ann and Sarah	United Kingdom	The ship was driven ashore at Port Penrhyn, Caernarfonshire.
Argo	United Kingdom	The brig ran aground at Schulau, Duchy of Schleswig.
Bedside	United Kingdom	The ship was driven ashore north of Newbiggin-by-the-Sea, Northumberland. She was on a voyage from Rouen, Seine-Inférieure, France to Blyth, Northumberland. Bedside was refloated on 18 March and towed in to Blyth.
Bee	United Kingdom	The ship ran aground on the Herd Sand, in the North Sea off the coast of County Durham. She was on a voyage from Rouen to South Shields, County Durham. She was refloated the next day.
Bellevue	United Kingdom	The schooner was driven ashore and wrecked at Kingstown. Her crew survived.
Bettles	United Kingdom	The schooner was driven ashore and sank at Kingstown. Her crew survived.
Brothers	United Kingdom	The schooner was driven ashore and wrecked at Arklow, County Wicklow with the loss of two of her crew.
Castle	United Kingdom	The ship was driven ashore at Pwllheli, Caernarfonshire. She was refloated on 20 March and taken in to Pwllheli.
Catherine	United Kingdom	The sloop was driven ashore and damaged at Kingstown. Her crew survived.
Chase	United Kingdom	The ship was driven ashore in Cayton Bay. She was on a voyage from London to Sunderland, County Durham. She was refloated and taken in to Whitby, Yorkshire.
Colonel Smith	United Kingdom	The sloop was driven ashore and damaged at Kingstown. Her crew survived.
Dorothy	United Kingdom	The ship was driven ashore at Port Penrhyn.
Edward Auld	United Kingdom	The ship ran aground at the mouth of the River Moy. She was refloated on 25 March and taken in to Ballina, County Mayo.
Elizabeth	United Kingdom	The ship was driven ashore at Pwllheli. She was on a voyage from Barrow-in-Furness, Cumberland to Swansea, Glamorgan.
Ellen	United Kingdom	The ship was driven ashore at Pwllheli. She was on a voyage from Portmadoc to Swansea. She was refloated on 20 March and resumed her voyage.
Gelaert	United Kingdom	The ship was driven ashore at Pwllheli. She was on a voyage from Portmadoc, Caernarfonshire to Bridgwater, Somerset.
Homer	United Kingdom	The brig was driven ashore and wrecked at Kingstown. Her crew survived.
Hope	United Kingdom	The ship was driven ashore at Pwllheli. She was on a voyage from Bangor to Exeter, Devon. She was refloated on 20 March and resumed her voyage.
Hopewell	United Kingdom	The ship was driven ashore at Pwllheli. She was refloated on 20 March and resumed her voyage.
Jane and Frances	United Kingdom	The schooner was driven ashore and severely damaged at Kingstown. Her crew survived.
John	(United Kingdom of Great Britain and Ireland) Jersey	The ship was driven ashore and wrecked on Great Saltee Island, County Wexford.
Julia	United Kingdom	The schooner was driven ashore and scuttled at Brixham, Devon.
Lady of the Lake	United Kingdom	The ship was driven ashore at Pwllheli.
Majestic	(United Kingdom of Great Britain and Ireland) Isle of Man	The ship was driven ashore at "Ballydoyle", County Dublin. Her crew were rescued. She was refloated on 26 March and taken in to Dublin.
Margaret	United Kingdom	The ship ran aground off South Shields. She was on a voyage from South Shields to Venice, Kingdom of Lombardy–Venetia. She was refloated and put back to South Shields in a leaky condition.
Maria	United Kingdom	The ship was driven ashore and damaged at Kingstown. Her crew survived.
Mary	United Kingdom	The brig was driven ashore and sank at Kingstown. Her crew survived.
Mary Ann	United Kingdom	The ship was driven ashore and sank at Pwllheli. She was on a voyage from Portmadoc to London. Mary Ann was refloated on 13 May.
Nereid	United Kingdom	The ship was driven ashore and damaged at Elbury Cove, Devon. She was on a voyage from South Shields to Malta. She was refloated on 21 March and taken in to Brixham.
Nimble	United Kingdom	The ship was driven ashore at Port Penrhyn.
Pandora	United Kingdom	The brig was driven ashore and damaged at Kingstown. Her crew survived.
Penrhyn Castle	United Kingdom	The flat was driven ashore at Arklow. Her crew were rescued.
Penryn Castle	United Kingdom	The ship was driven ashore at Port Penrhyn.
Seymour	United Kingdom	The schooner was wrecked on the Kish Bank, in the Irish Sea off the coast of County Dublin with the loss of all hands.
Thomas	United Kingdom	The ship was driven ashore at Pwllheli.
Thomas Agnes	United Kingdom	The ship was driven ashore and sank at Kingstown. Her crew survived.
Tom	United Kingdom	The schooner was driven ashore and sank at Kingstown. Her crew survived.
Twenty-ninth of May	United Kingdom	The ship was driven ashore and severely damaged at Guernsey, Channel Islands. She had been refloated by 18 March and taken in to Guernsey.
Union	United Kingdom	The ship was driven ashore at Port Penrhyn.
Union el Fraternite	Austrian Empire	The ship was wrecked on the Fourmies, in the Mediterranean Sea off Montecristo, Grand Duchy of Tuscany. Her crew were rescued.
Unity	United Kingdom	The ship was driven ashore at Pwllheli. She was refloated on 20 March and resumed her voyage.
William	United Kingdom	The sloop was run down and sunk in the River Thames at Erith, Kent by Royal Adelaide (United Kingdom). Her crew survived.
William and Richard	United Kingdom	The smack was driven ashore at Pwllheli. She was refloated on 20 March and resumed her voyage.
William Sefton	United Kingdom	The ship was wrecked off Saltfleet, Lincolnshire with the loss of two of her three crew. She was on a voyage from Maldon, Essex to Goole, Yorkshire.

== 17 March ==
List of shipwrecks: 17 March 1844
Ship	State	Description
Abeona	United Kingdom	The ship was driven ashore at the Mumbles, Glamorgan. She was refloated on 20 March.
Ann Elliott	United Kingdom	The ship was driven ashore at Elbury Cove, between Brixham and Paignton, Devon. She was on a voyage from Sunderland, County Durham to Paimbœuf, Loire-Inférieure, France. She was refloated on 21 March and taken in to Brixham.
Back Spring	United Kingdom	The ship was driven ashore at Brixham.
Balak	United Kingdom	The schooner was driven ashore and wrecked at Lamlash, Isle of Arran.
Brothers	United Kingdom	The Penzance-registered ship was driven ashore at the Mumbles. She was refloated on 20 March.
Brothers	United Kingdom	The Swansea-registered ship was driven ashore at the Mumbles. She was on a voyage from Swansea to Bridgwater, Somerset. She was refloated on 19 March and taken in to Swansea.
Bulwark; Charles, and Experience	United Kingdom	The schooners Bulwark and Experience and the smack Charles were all in collision and then driven ashore on the Isle of Arran, Inner Hebrides. Experience was severely damaged, the others suffered less damage.
Charles	United Kingdom	The smack was driven ashore at the Mumbles. She was on a voyage from Swansea to Port Talbot, Glamorgan. She was refloated on 19 March.
Cognac	United Kingdom	The ship was in collision with a brig and foundered in the English Channel 35 nautical miles (65 km) off Beachy Head, Sussex. Her six crew were rescued by the schooner Gother ( Sweden). Cognac was on a voyage from South Shields, County Durham to Jersey, Channel Islands.
Diligence	United Kingdom	The ship was driven ashore at the Mumbles. She was refloated on 19 March.
Elizabeth Ann	United Kingdom	The ship was driven ashore and wrecked at Beaumaris, Anglesey. She was on a voyage from Liverpool, Lancashire to South Shields, County Durham.
Fame	United Kingdom	The ship was driven ashore at the Mumbles. She was refloated on 19 March.
Forrester	United Kingdom	The schooner was driven ashore and wrecked at Youghal, County Cork. Her crew were rescued. She was on a voyage from Newport, Monmouthshire to Kinsale, County Cork. She was refloated on 23 March.
Fortune	United Kingdom	The ship was driven ashore and wrecked at Broadsands, Devon.
Georgina	United Kingdom	The barque was wrecked on the Blackwater Bank, in the Irish Sea off the coast of County Wexford with the loss of twelve of her fourteen crew. She was on a voyage from Liverpool to Arica, Chile.
Gratitude	United Kingdom	The ship was driven ashore at the Mumbles. She was refloated on 19 March.
Hannah	United Kingdom	The ship was driven ashore at the Mumbles. She was refloated on 19 March.
Hero	United Kingdom	The ship was driven ashore at the Mumbles. She was refloated on 19 March.
Hibernia	United Kingdom	The ship was driven ashore at Paignton. Her crew were rescued.
Index	United States	The ship was wrecked near Cape Pine, Newfoundland, British North America. She was on a voyage from New York to Saint John's, Newfoundland.
Jane	United Kingdom	The ship was severely damaged by fire at Maryport, Cumberland.
Rebecca	United Kingdom	The ship was driven ashore and wrecked at the Mumbles.
Superior	United Kingdom	The ship was driven ashore at the Mumbles. She was refloated on 20 March.
Tagus	United Kingdom	The ship was driven ashore at Brixham. She was on a voyage from South Shields to Naples, Kingdom of the Two Sicilies. She was refloated and taken in to Brixham.
Thomas Kenyon	United Kingdom	The ship was driven ashore at Sunderland, County Durham. She was refloated and taken in to Sunderland.
Union	United Kingdom	The ship was driven ashore at the Mumbles. She was refloated on 19 March.
Vrouw Hendrika	Hamburg	The ship ran aground on the Steilsund, in the North Sea. She was on a voyage from Bremen to Hamburg. She was refloated the next day and towed in to Cuxhaven.
William Harrington	United Kingdom	The ship was driven ashore at Brixham. She was on a voyage from South Shields to Cartagena, Spain.

== 18 March ==
List of shipwrecks: 18 March 1844
Ship	State	Description
Charlotte	United Kingdom	The ship was driven ashore at Freiston Main, Lincolnshire. Her crew were rescued. She was refloated on 20 March and resumed her voyage.
Cognac	United Kingdom	The ship was in collision with a brig and foundered in the English Channel. Her crew were rescued by Gotha (United Kingdom). Cognac was on a voyage from South Shields, County Durham to Jersey, Channel Islands.
David Duffell	United States	The ship was driven ashore in the Buttermilk Channel. She was later refloated.
Hibernia	United Kingdom	The ship ran aground, capsized and was destroyed by fire at Middlesbrough, Yorkshire. Her crew were rescued.
Louise	United Kingdom	The ship was wrecked on the north east coast of Læsø, Denmark.
Mary	United Kingdom	The ship ran aground and was severely damaged at Wicklow. She was on a voyage from Killala, County Louth to London.
Marys	United Kingdom	The ship was wrecked on Læsø. Her crew were rescued. She was on a voyage from Newcastle upon Tyne, Northumberland to Königsberg, Prussia.
Perseverance	United Kingdom	The ship was beached at Clee Ness, Lincolnshire. She was on a voyage from Barton upon Humber, Lincolnshire to London. She was refloated and taken in to Grimsby, Lincolnshire.
Tynemouth Castle	United Kingdom	The ship ran aground on the Lappegrund, off the coast of Denmark. She was refloated the next day and taken in to Helsingør, Denmark.

== 19 March ==
List of shipwrecks: 19 March 1844
Ship	State	Description
Betties	United Kingdom	The schooner was driven ashore at Kingstown, County Dublin.
Don Quixote	Spain	The ship was wrecked on the Hogsties. Her crew were rescued. She was on a voyage from St. Jago de Cuba, Cuba to Antwerp, Belgium.
Fama	Hamburg	The ship ran aground off Havana, Cuba and was wrecked. Her crew were rescued.
Industry	United Kingdom	The ship was wrecked on the East Barrows Sand, in the North Sea off the coast of Essex. She was on a voyage from Spalding, Lincolnshire to London.
Rapid	United Kingdom	The ship was driven ashore by ice in Køge Bay.
Stad Schiedam	Netherlands	The ship ran aground on the Hompelvelt Bank, in the North Sea. She was on a voyage from Batavia, Netherlands East Indies to Rotterdam, South Holland.
Sultan	United Kingdom	The ship was wrecked on the Gunfleet Sand, in the North Sea off the coast of Essex. She was on a voyage from Sunderland, County Durham to a Mediterranean port.
Wetherall	United Kingdom	The ship was sighted in the Strait of Sunda whilst on a voyage from Batavia to Amsterdam, North Holland, Netherlands. No further trace, presumed foundered with the loss of all hands.

== 20 March ==
List of shipwrecks: 20 March 1844
Ship	State	Description
Ivy	United Kingdom	The schooner was driven ashore at Hayle, Cornwall.
Plough	United Kingdom	The schooner was in collision with the smack Mary Balfour (United Kingdom) and foundered in the North Sea. Three of the twelve people on board were rescued by Mary Balfour. Plough was on a voyage form Portmahomack, Ross-shire to London.
Scotia	United Kingdom	The schooner was driven ashore at Pile Foundry, Lancashire.
Trusty	United Kingdom	The ship was driven ashore and wrecked at Thisted, Denmark. Her ten crew were rescued. She was on a voyage from Newcastle upon Tyne, Northumberland to Copenhagen, Denmark.

== 21 March ==
List of shipwrecks: 21 March 1844
Ship	State	Description
Clio	United Kingdom	The ship capsized and sank at Cork. She was on a voyage from Bridgwater, Somerset to Savannah, Georgia, United States.
Gazelle	United Kingdom	The smack was wrecked on Breaksea Point, Glamorgan. She was on a voyage from Milford Haven, Pembrokeshire to Newport, Monmouthshire.
Ornen	Norway	The ship was driven ashore at the mouth of the Orne. Her crew were rescued.
Partisan	United Kingdom	The ship ran aground on the Scroby Sands, Norfolk. She was on a voyage from Hartlepool, County Durham to London. She was refloated and resumed her voyage.
William	United Kingdom	The sloop was wrecked on the Noose Sand, in the Bristol Channel. She was on a voyage from Cardiff, Glamorgan to Bullo Pill, Gloucestershire.

== 22 March ==
List of shipwrecks: 22 March 1844
Ship	State	Description
Daisey	United Kingdom	The ship was wrecked on the north side of the "Romer". Her crew were rescued. She was on a voyage from Dundee, Forfarshire to Memel, Prussia.
Johannes	Bremen	The ship departed from Bremen for Baltimore, Maryland. No further trace, presumed foundered with the loss of all fourteen crew and 156 passengers.
Magnet	United Kingdom	The schooner ran aground and capsized in the Humber at Whitton, Lincolnshire. Her crew were rescued. She was on a voyage from Goole, Yorkshire to London.
Partisan	United Kingdom	The ship ran aground on Scroby Sands, Norfolk. She was on a voyage from Hartlepool, County Durham to London. She was refloated the next day and resumed her voyage.
Undine	United Kingdom	The ship ran aground on the Scheelhoek, off the Dutch coast. She was on a voyage from Newcastle upon Tyne, Northumberland to Amsterdam, North Holland, Netherlands. She was refloated and resumed her voyage.

== 23 March ==
List of shipwrecks: 23 March 1844
Ship	State	Description
Benjamin Alexander	United Kingdom	The ship was driven ashore and wrecked on Mew Island, County Down. She was on a voyage from Inverness to Liverpool, Lancashire.
Corsair	(United Kingdom of Great Britain and Ireland) British North America	The barque ran aground on the Goodwin Sands, Kent. She was on a voyage from New York City, United States to London.
Hannah	United Kingdom	The ship ran aground on the Holm Sand, in the North Sea off the coast of Suffolk. She was refloated.
Hannah	United Kingdom	The ship ran aground on the Scheehoeck. She was on a voyage from Newcastle upon Tyne, Northumberland to Rotterdam, South Holland, Netherlands. She was refloated.
Magnet	Hamburg	The ship driven ashore on the north coast of Minorca, Spain. She was on a voyage from New Orleans, Louisiana, United States to Marseille, Bouches-du-Rhône, France.
Ocean Child	United Kingdom	The ship was driven ashore at Ballyferris Point, County Down. She was on a voyage from Sligo to London. She was refloated on 24 March.

== 24 March ==
List of shipwrecks: 24 March 1844
Ship	State	Description
Anivina	Norway	The ship was driven ashore and wrecked near "Nytrelleswind". Her crew were rescued. She was on a voyage from Delfzijl, South Holland, Netherlands to Larvik.
Arab	United Kingdom	The ship departed from Rio de Janeiro, Brazil for Launceston, Van Diemen's Land. No further trace, presumed foundered with the loss of all hands.
Mona's Queen	(United Kingdom of Great Britain and Ireland) Isle of Man	The ship ran aground on the Conmell Rock, off the coast of Argyllshire.
Mount's Bay	United Kingdom	The sloop was driven ashore at Battery Point, Devon. She was refloated.
Sir Walter Scott	United Kingdom	The brigantine was wrecked on the Morant Keys, off the coast of Jamaica. Her crew were rescued. She was on a voyage from La Guaira, Venezuela to Jamaica.
Thomas	United Kingdom	The ship was run down and sunk in Liverpool Bay off the Crosby Lightship ( Trinity House) by Nithsdale (United Kingdom) with the loss of three of her six crew. Thomas was on a voyage from Liverpool, Lancashire to Belfast, County Antrim.

== 25 March ==
List of shipwrecks: 25 March 1844
Ship	State	Description
Amo	Ottoman Empire	The ship was driven ashore and damaged at Malta. She was refloated but found to be very leaky.
Annunciata Inglisi	United States of the Ionian Islands	The brig was driven ashore and damaged at Malta.
Clio	United Kingdom	The ship capsized at Cork. She was on a voyage from Bridgwater, Somerset to Savannah, Georgia, United States.
Hamilton	United Kingdom	The ship was wrecked on Saint Vincent.
Lycergue	France	The steamship was driven ashore at Malta. She was refloated with assistance from HMS Queen (Royal Navy).
Patria Monte	Russia	The brig was driven ashore on Malta. She was on a voyage from Odesa to Marseille, Bouches-du-Rhône, France. She was refloated.
Thomas	United Kingdom	The ship was run down and sunk off the Crosby Lighthouse, Lancashire by Nithsdale (United Kingdom) with the loss of all but three of her crew. Thomas was on a voyage from Liverpool, Lancashire to Belfast, County Antrim.
San Michele Arcangelo	Kingdom of the Two Sicilies	The brig was driven ashore and wrecked at Malta.
William	Sweden	The brig was wrecked on the Île du Planier, Bouches-du-Rhône, France. Her crew were rescued.
Zephyr	United Kingdom	The brigantine was wrecked at Peniche, Portugal. Her nine crew were rescued. She was on a voyage from Troon, Ayrshire to Málaga, Spain.

== 26 March ==
List of shipwrecks: 26 March 1844
Ship	State	Description
Augustus	(United Kingdom of Great Britain and Ireland) New South Wales	The ship ran aground in Holdfast Bay. She had been refloated by 29 March.
Benjamin and Alexander	United Kingdom	The ship was driven ashore in the Copeland Islands, County Down. She was on a voyage from Loch Orr to Liverpool, Lancashire.
Hamilton	(United Kingdom of Great Britain and Ireland) Saint Vincent	The drogher, a schooner was driven ashore and wrecked on Saint Vincent.
Henry and William	United Kingdom	The ship was wrecked near Lindisfarne, Northumberland. Her crew were rescued. She was on a voyage from Middlesbrough, Yorkshire to Leith, Lothian.
Mercure	France	The ship foundered at Dunkirk, Nord.

== 28 March ==
List of shipwrecks: 28 March 1844
Ship	State	Description
Kara	United Kingdom	The ship was wrecked at the mouth of the Loire. Her crew were rescued. She was on a voyage from Newcastle upon Tyne, Northumberland to Nantes, Loire-Inférieure, France.
Myngenoegen	Denmark	The ship struck a rock and sank in the North Sea of the coast of Groningen, Netherlands. Her crew were rescued. She was on a voyage from Mellerup to "Louvain".
Sirion	United Kingdom	The ship was driven ashore near "Porthleichog". She was on a voyage from Caernarvon to Boston.

== 29 March ==
List of shipwrecks: 29 March 1844
Ship	State	Description
Betty Frederika	Hamburg	The ship was driven ashore and wrecked on Skagen Denmark. Her crew were rescued. She was on a voyage from Altona to Landskrona, Sweden.
Lima	United Kingdom	The ship was wrecked on the Tadder, off the coast of Norway. Her crew were rescued.
Marida	Prussia	The ship ran aground at Memel. She was on a voyage from Memel to Liverpool, Lancashire, United Kingdom. She was refloated on 2 April and taken in to Memel.
Quiz	United Kingdom	The ship was driven ashore at the Red Noses. She was on a voyage from Zakynthos, United States of the Ionian Islands to Liverpool, Lancashire. She was refloated the next day and taken in to Liverpool.

== 30 March ==
List of shipwrecks: 30 March 1844
Ship	State	Description
Dolphin	Prussia	The ship ran aground on the Domsteen, off the coast of Denmark. She was on a voyage from Hull, Yorkshire, United Kingdom to Liebau. She was later refloated and resumed her voyage.
Emma	Netherlands	The ship was wrecked on the Plaza de Chivas, off Havana, Cuba. She was on a voyage from Amsterdam, North Holland to Havana.
Enterprise	(United Kingdom of Great Britain and Ireland) New Zealand	The cutter was wrecked in Howland's Bay, Queen Charlotte Sound, where she had sought shelter during a voyage from Wellington to Nelson. Her anchor cable parted and the ship was driven onto rocks. All hands were saved.
Najaden	Denmark	The ship was driven ashore by ice near "Hajanas". She was on a voyage from Liverpool, Lancashire, United Kingdom to Copenhagen. She was refloated on 2 April and taken in to Helsingør.
Thyabie	United Kingdom	The ship was wrecked on the Lafolle Reef. Her crew were rescued. She was subsequently set afire and burnt. Thyabie was on a voyage from London to Jamaica.

== 31 March ==
List of shipwrecks: 31 March 1844
Ship	State	Description
Reward	United Kingdom	The ship ran aground off Faro, Portugal. She was on a voyage from Messina, Sicily to London. She was refloated the next day and taken into Faro in a leaky condition.
Wellington	United Kingdom	The ship was wrecked in the Dry Tortugas. She was on a voyage from New Orleans, Louisiana to London.

== Unknown date ==
List of shipwrecks: Unknown date in March 1844
Ship	State	Description
Anne Catherine	France	The ship was driven ashore at Quillebeuf-sur-Seine, Eure. She was refloated on 17 March.
Aurora	United Kingdom	The ship ran aground and was severely damaged off Troon, Ayrshire before 14 March. She was refloated on 25 March.
Betsey & Jenny	United Kingdom	The ship was wrecked at Port Rush, County Antrim with the loss of three of her crew.
Bob the Ranter	United Kingdom	The ship was driven ashore at Ardrossan, Ayrshire. She was on a voyage from Glasgow, Renfrewshire to Liverpool, Lancashire. She was refloated on 21 March and taken into Ardrossan.
Chimera	United Kingdom	The ship ran aground near Formby, Lancashire. She was on a voyage from Liverpool to Mauritius. She was refloated on 24 March and resumed her voyage.
Clitus	United Kingdom	The ship was driven ashore at Troon. She was refloated on 25 March.
Eclipse	United Kingdom	The ship was driven ashore at Rosneath, Argyllshire. She was on a voyage from Glasgow to Gibraltar. She was refloated on 9 March and towed in to Glasgow for repairs.
Experience	United Kingdom	The ship was driven ashore on the Isle of Arran. She was refloated on 20 March and towed in to Ardrossan.
Fenella	(United Kingdom of Great Britain and Ireland) British North America	The ship was abandoned in the English Channel on or before 14 March with the loss of all hands. She came ashore at Saint-Valery-sur-Somme, France and was wrecked. She was on a voyage from Liverpool, Lancashire to Hamburg.
Frances Mary	United Kingdom	The ship was driven ashore at Whitby, Yorkshire. She was refloated on 25 March and taken into Whitby.
Georgio	Kingdom of the Two Sicilies	The ship was wrecked at Wexford, United Kingdom before 17 March.
Harriet, Rose	(United Kingdom of Great Britain and Ireland) New South Wales	Rose collided with the schooner Harriet and both vessels were driven ashore at Broulee. Harriet was later refloated, Rose was wrecked.
Hopewell	United Kingdom	The ship was driven ashore at Redcar, Yorkshire. She was refloated on 25 March and taken into Whitby.
Industry	United Kingdom	The ship struck the Skate Rock and sank. She had been refloated by 20 March and sailed for Maryport, Cumberland.
Isabella	United Kingdom	The ship was driven ashore at Troon. She was refloated on 25 March.
James	United Kingdom	The ship was driven ashore at Ardrossan. She was refloated on 21 March and taken in to Ardrossan.
Owen	United Kingdom	The ship ran aground on the Colorados, off the coast of Cuba before 22 March and was abandoned.
President	France	The ship foundered in the Baltic Sea before 1 April. She was on a voyage from Stettin to Nantes, Loire-Inférieure, France.
Preston	United Kingdom	The ship was driven ashore at Troon. She was refloated on 25 March.
Quebec	United Kingdom	The brig was abandoned in the Atlantic Ocean before 21 March. She was taken in tow by two French luggers on 7 April and taken into Penzance, Cornwall, where she arrived on 11 April.
Queen	United Kingdom	The brig was abandoned in the Atlantic Ocean before 15 March.
Susan	United Kingdom	The ship was driven ashore at The Mumbles, Glamorgan. She was refloated on 6 March and taken in to Llanelly, Glamorgan for repairs.
Three Sodskende	Norway	The ship was run down and sunk, allegedly by the schooner Harmony (United Kingdom).
Vierge Marie	Belgium	The ship was wrecked near Cape Mallina, Lesbos, Greece. She was on a voyage from Smyrna, Ottoman Empire to New York, United States.
Westall	United Kingdom	The barque was wrecked in the Mediterranean Sea. Her crew survived. She was on a voyage from London to Corfu, Greece.
William and Betty	United Kingdom	The ship was driven ashore at Troon.
