= John Trevenant =

14th and 15th-century Bishop of Hereford

- Bishop of Hereford
- Appointed: 5 May 1389
- Term ended: 29 March 1404
- Predecessor: John Gilbert
- Successor: Robert Mascall

Orders
- Consecration: 29 June 1389

Personal details
- Died: 29 March 1404
- Denomination: Catholic

John Trevenant (alternatively Trefnant or Tresnant; in some sources named Thomas Trevenant; died 29 March 1404) was a medieval Bishop of Hereford of Welsh descent. He was nominated on 5 May 1389 and consecrated on 20 June 1389.

Trevenant was from the village Trefnant in North Wales. According to R. G. Davies in the Oxford Dictionary of National Biography, Richard II of England "told the pope that Trefnant was related 'in a close degree' to certain nobles 'assisting at our side'", presumed to refer to the Lords Appellant and specifically the earls of Arundel.

In the deposition of Richard II, Trevenant and Richard Scrope played a central part.

== Citations ==
Catholic Church titles
Preceded by John Gilbert	Bishop of Hereford; 1389–1404	Succeeded by Robert Mascall
