= John Gilbert (bishop of St Davids) =

14th-century English Bishop and Treasurer of England

- Bishop of St. David's
- Appointed: 5 May 1389
- In office: 28 July 1397
- Predecessor: Richard Metford
- Successor: Guy Mone
- Previous posts: Bishop of Bangor; Bishop of Hereford

Personal details
- Died: 28 July 1397
- Denomination: Catholic

John Gilbert (died 1397) was a medieval Bishop of Bangor, Bishop of Hereford and Bishop of St. David's.

Gilbert was nominated to Bangor on 17 March 1372.

Gilbert was translated to Hereford on 12 September 1375.

Gilbert was Lord High Treasurer from 1386 to 1389 and then again from late 1389 to 1391.

Gilbert was translated to St. David's on 5 May 1389 and died on 28 July 1397.

== Citations ==
Political offices
Preceded by John Fordham	Lord High Treasurer; 1386–1389	Succeeded by Thomas Brantingham
Preceded by Thomas Brantingham	Lord High Treasurer; 1389–1391	Succeeded by John Waltham
Catholic Church titles
Preceded by Hywel ab Goronwy	Bishop of Bangor; 1372–1375	Succeeded by John Swaffham
Preceded by William Courtenay	Bishop of Hereford; 1375–1389	Succeeded by Thomas Trevenant
Preceded by Adam Houghton	Bishop of St David's; 1389–1394	Succeeded by Guy Mone
