= William de Brantingham =

Sir William de Brantingham was an English noble of the late fourteenth century, of the Brantingham family. He was the brother of Thomas de Brantingham, bishop of Exeter and Lord Treasurer.

== Legal duties ==
On the death of John de Henley, who was without issue, Sir William acted as feoffee of de Henley's estate, granting the manor of Henley to the Crown, then worn by Edward III (1327–1377).

Sir William also stood as legal guardian to the last male heir of the de Cahaignes (or Keynes) family, high sheriffs of Dorset and Somerset and lords of Dodford in Northamptonshire, and his sister Wentiliana. Following the death in boyhood of the heir in 1337 and, shortly afterwards, Wentiliana without issue, Sir William used "artful chicaneries" to transfer the estate of Dodford to John Cressy, a grandson of Lettice Ayote, herself great-aunt of the late heir and Wentiliana, instead of to one Alice, in whom "the right of inheritance clearly vested". The "chicaneries" were as follows:

That after the death of Wentiliana, he excited (incited) a woman to present herself before persons unknown, and personate Elizabeth Keynes, as late coming from the Holy Land, 'in white clothyn as it were in an estate of innocencye;' when on discreet examination she was found to be 'a beest envenymed through the covetye of the said Brantingham.'

In a notarial instrument dated 13 February 1373/1374 and given in St. Mary Magdalen, Milk Street, London, Sir William, together with Sir Hugh de Westwyck, also of the diocese of Durham, William Wyntryngham, a clerk, John Kyllynghale and John de Rome, all three of the diocese of York, were appointed as attorneys by Sir John Werenham, chaplain, canon of Auckland, Durham, and prebendary of "Fichynache", Durham, to take possession of the prebend, to let it and collect rents.

He served as the Member of Parliament for Northamptonshire in 1379, and for Surrey in the two parliaments of 1404.

== Bibliography ==
- Duchess of Cleveland (1889), Battle Abbey Roll, vol. 2, John Murray, archived from the original on 10 August 2011.
- Nottinghamshire Archives, "DD/FJ/10/7/8", Foljambe of Osberton: Deeds and Estate Papers, National Archives.
- Lysons, Daniel (1796), "Eltham", The Environs of London, vol. 4, British History Online, pp. 394–421.
