= Robert de Brantingham =

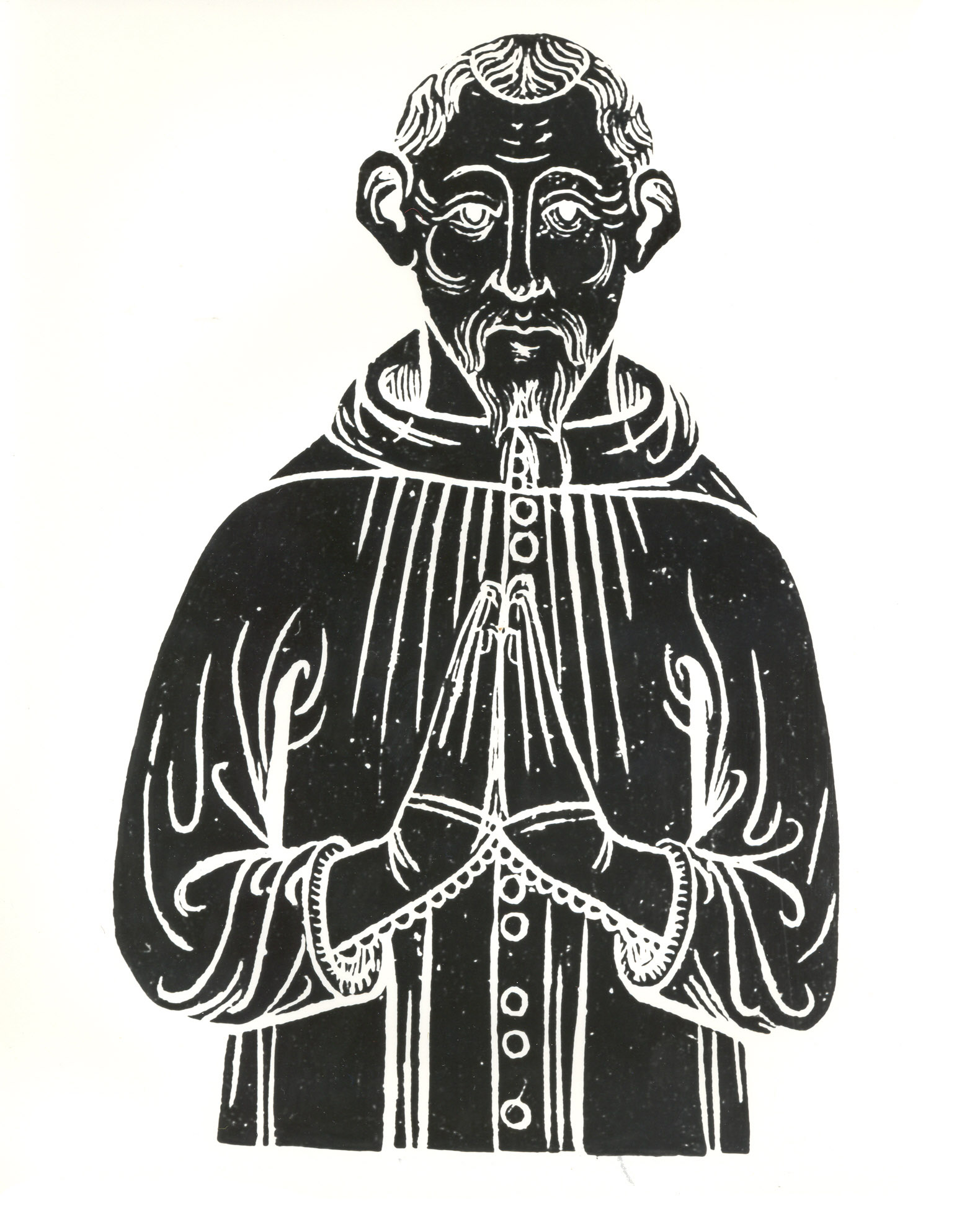
Brass half-effigy of Robert de Brantingham in St Martin's Church, East Horsley, Surrey

Robert de Brantingham (died c. 1400) was an English noble of the late fourteenth century. He lived in southern England, although the Brantingham family traditionally came from Brantingham in Yorkshire, and his half-effigy in brass may be found in St Martin's Church, East Horsley, Surrey.

== Legal involvement ==
On 18 November 1381, in a case tried at Westminster, de Brantingham stood alongside Alexander Marley and two clerks, Thomas de Staindrop and Thomas de Barton, as plaintiff against Sir John and Gwenllian de Raleigh. The action was a plea of covenant concerning Drewsteignton, Devon, for which de Brantingham and his fellow plaintiffs paid 100 marks, and in return were granted the manor of Drewsteignton.

De Brantingham also stood as a witness to the grant by Sir John de Segrave to John de Denton of Sileby, his wife, Emma, and his son, William, of a messuage in the vill of Sileby with five acres of land and three roods of meadow, which one Reginald Robinet formerly held, for their lives, rent 10 shillings a year.

== Bibliography ==
- Surrey Archaeological Society (1920), Surrey archaeological collections, vol. 33.
