= William Brantingham =

- Seneschal of the Prior of Durham
- Church: Durham Priory
- Appointed: 1536/1537
- Other post: Gospeller

Personal details
- Died: 1548
- Denomination: Anglican
- Residence: Dun Cow Lane, Lydgate, from 1540

William Brantingham was an English clergyman of the sixteenth century and a member of the Brantingham family. He held various posts, including seneschal of the prior of Durham in 1536–1537, and was a gospeller from 1541 until his death in 1548. Brantingham lived in Dun Cow Lane, Lydgate, from 1540.

== Bibliography ==
- The Durham University journal, vol. 39–41, Durham: University of Durham, 1946.
