= Edward Upham =

English bookseller, antiquarian and orientalist

Edward Upham (1776–1834) was an English bookseller, antiquarian and orientalist.

== Life ==
The third son of Charles Upham (1739–1807), mayor of Exeter in 1796, he was born at Exeter. He began life as a bookseller there; his brother John carried on a similar business in Bath, Somerset. Upham became a member of the corporation, was sheriff in 1807, and mayor of Exeter in 1809. He retired and spent time writing.

Upham was a member of the Royal Asiatic Society, and a fellow of the Society of Antiquaries of London. Towards the end of his life he resided at Dawlish, where he was one of the charity trustees. He died at Bath on 24 January 1834.

== Works ==
Upham wrote:

- Rameses: an Egyptian Tale, with Historical Notes of the Era of the Pharaohs, London, 1824, 3 vols. (anonymous).
- Karmath: an Arabian Tale, London, 1827, (anonymous).
- The History and Doctrine of Buddhism, popularly illustrated with Notices of the Kappooism or Demon Worship, and of the Bali, or Planetary Incantations of Ceylon, with 43 lithographic prints from original Singalese designs, London, 1829.
- History of the Ottoman Empire from its Establishment till the year 1828, Edinburgh, 1829, 2 vols. (Constable's Miscellany vols. xl. and xli.).
- Historical and Descriptive Notices of China and its North-Western Dependencies, London, 1832 (from Gentleman's Magazine October 1832).
- The Mahávansi, the Rájá-Ratnácari, and the Rájá-vali, forming the Sacred and Historical Books of Ceylon; also a Collection of Tracts illustrative of the Doctrines and Literature of Buddhism, translated from the Singhalese, London, 1833, 3 vols. (edited by Upham).

Upham also finished the Index to the Rolls of Parliament, comprising the Petitions, Pleas, and Proceedings of Parliament (A.D. 1278–A.D. 1503), begun by John Strachey and John Pridden, and published London, 1832.

== Family ==
Upham married, 25 August 1801, Mary (died 19 October 1829), daughter of John Hoblyn, vicar of Newton St. Cyres and Padstow.

== Notes ==
Attribution

This article incorporates text from a publication now in the public domain: Lee, Sidney, ed. (1899). "Upham, Edward". Dictionary of National Biography. Vol. 58. London: Smith, Elder & Co.
