= John Strachey (priest) =

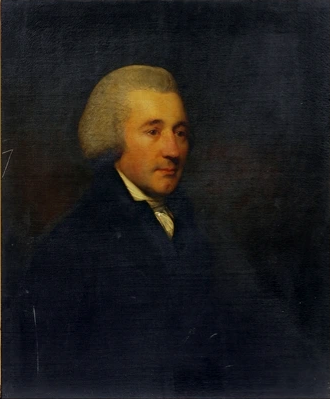
John Strachey

John Strachey (1737–1818) was Archdeacon of Suffolk from 5 March 1781 until his death on 17 December 1818.

== Life ==
Strachey was born in Edinburgh on 30 July 1737, the second son of Henry Strachey of Sutton Court, and younger brother of Sir Henry Strachey, 1st Baronet. He was educated at Trinity College, Cambridge. He was ordained in 1760 and became Chaplain to Philip Yonge, Bishop of Norwich of Erwarton from 1801 to 1835. He held livings at Erpingham and Thwaite.

Strachey was an Honorary Chaplain to the King from 1774 until his death at Ramsgate. He was the preacher of the Rolls Chapel, from 1783 to 1817.

== Antiquarian ==
Strachey was a Fellow of the Society of Antiquaries of London. He saw through the press the 1777 edition of the Rolls of Parliament (Edward I to Henry VII, partial). He also began an index and glossary to the Rolls. It was continued by John Pridden, with John Calder; and completed by Edward Upham, with publication in 1832.

== Family ==
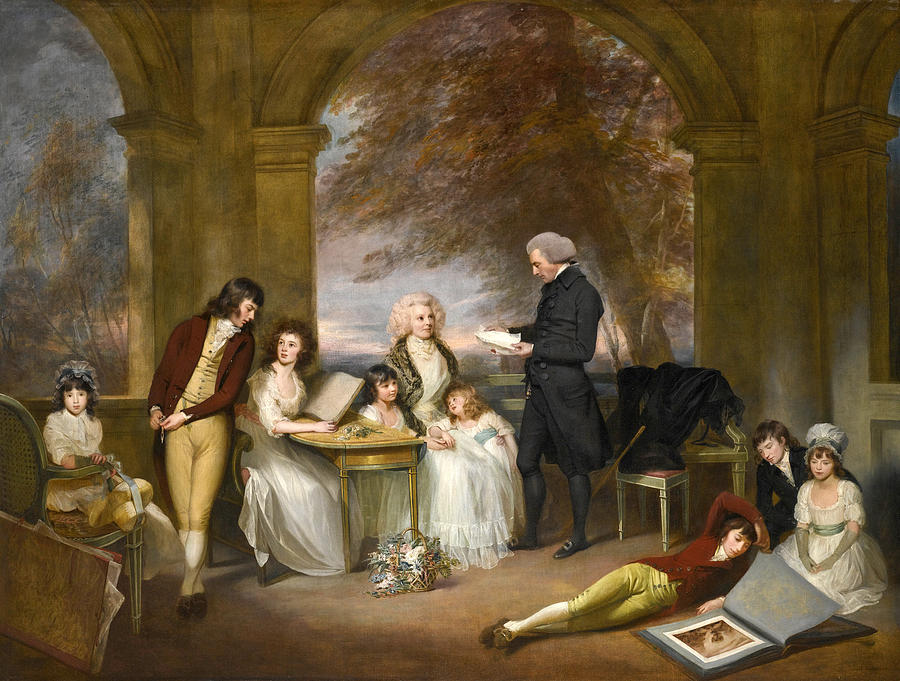
Portrait of Archdeacon Strachey and his Family, by William Beechey, with his wife Anne and eight children

Strachey married Anne Wombwell (died 1836), daughter of George Wombwell. They had five sons, two of whom died young, and five daughters. The sons included John Strachey (1773–1808) and George Strachey (1776–1849), both judges in India. The third son to reach adulthood, Christopher Strachey (1778–1855), was a naval captain.

Of the daughters, Eliza married in 1814 Barlow Trecothick, of Addington Place. He was the son of James Ivers Trecothick and his wife Susanna Edmondstone, and great-nephew of Barlow Trecothick the Lord Mayor of London. Elizabeth (died 1875), a diarist, married Thomas Henry Ernst of Westcombe; Ernst (1774–1855) was in the East India Company service from 1792 to 1811, and bought the Westcombe estate at the end of the 1810s.
