= Seaton, County Durham =

Village in County Durham, England

Coordinates: 54.843°N 1.379°W

Seaton
- Location within County Durham
- Population: 1,271
- OS grid reference: NZ399499
- Civil parish: Seaton with Slingley
- Unitary authority: County Durham
- Ceremonial county: County Durham
- Region: North East
- Country: England
- Sovereign state: United Kingdom
- Post town: SEAHAM
- Postcode district: SR7
- Police: Durham
- Fire: County Durham and Darlington
- Ambulance: North East

Seaton is a village in County Durham, in England. It is on the A19 road south of Sunderland. It is located approximately 2 miles west of Seaham

The village has two pubs.
