= Joseph Brasbridge =

British silversmith (1743 – 1832)

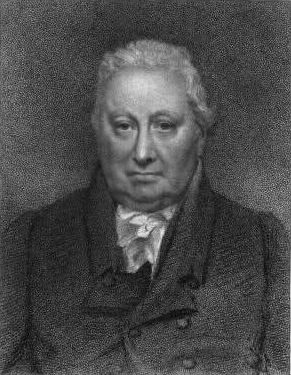
- Born: 1743
- Died: 28 February 1832 (aged 88–89); Highgate, England
- Occupation: Silversmith

Joseph Brasbridge (1743 – 28 February 1832), was a silversmith and autobiographer.

== Life ==
Brasbridge began business as a silversmith, with a good capital, in Fleet Street, London. Pleasure continually seduced him from his shop, and bankruptcy followed as a matter of course; but eventually he was re-established in business through the kindness of friends. In his eightieth year, hoping that his own indiscretions might prove a warning to others, he had published, at his own expense, his memoirs under the title of The Fruits of Experience. His book went through two printings in 1824. It has not been reprinted since. His portrait is prefixed.

He married firstly, Ann Slade at St Bride's Church, London in 1772. Secondly, Elizabeth Greenhill at St Albans Abbey in 1788.

He died at Southwood Lane, Highgate on 28 February 1832 and was buried at St Mary's, Hornsey beside his wife Elizabeth (1757 - 1839).
