= Thomas Sparke (bishop) =

Thomas Sparke was the only medieval incumbent of the office of Bishop of Berwick in England. Previously Prior of Lindisfarne and Prebendary at Durham Cathedral, he was consecrated by Edward Lee, Archbishop of York, in 1536 and continued in post until his death in 1572.
