= Thomas Brasbridge =

English divine and author

Thomas Brasbridge (1536/7–1593) was an English divine and author.

== Life ==
Brasbridge was born in 1536–7, of a Northamptonshire family, but lived at Banbury in his childhood. He was elected a demy of Magdalen College, Oxford, in 1553, a probationer fellow of All Souls' in 1558, when he graduated B.A. (18 November), and a fellow of Magdalen in 1562. He proceeded M.A. on 20 October 1564. At Oxford he studied both divinity and medicine, and remained to tend the plague-stricken during the severe epidemic of 1563–64. He supplicated for the degree of B.D. on 27 May 1574, but does not appear to have been granted it. About 1578 he resigned his fellowship. He describes himself as an inhabitant of London in that year, and engaged in tuition there. He subsequently obtained a living at Banbury, where he also opened a school and practised medicine. At Christmas-time 1558 he was seriously assaulted by a number of his parishioners belonging to the hamlet of Wickham (Note: in Neithrop, 2 miles SSW of Banbury) who refused to come to church. His assailants, who preferred "dancing, or some other like pastime" to church-going, were charged with recusancy before the privy council in March 1588–89.

== Writings ==
Brasbridge was the author of:

- Abdias the Prophet. Interpreted by T. B., Fellow of Magdalen College in Oxford London, 1574, dedicated to Henry Hastings, earl of Huntingdon;
- The Poore Man's Ievvel, that is to say, a Treatise of the Pestilence. Unto the which is annexed a declaration of the Vertues of the Heart's Carduus Benedictus and Angelica; which are very medicinable, both against the Plague and also against many other diseases, London, 1578, dedicated to Sir Thomas Ramsey, lord mayor of London. Other impressions are dated 1579 and 1580. A second enlarged edition was issued by Brasbridge in 1592, with a dedication (dated 'Banburie, the 20 of Ianuarie, 1592') to Anthony Cope and his wife Frances. In both editions Turner's 'Herball' is laid under frequent contribution
- Quæstiones in Officia M. T. Ciceronis, compendiariam totius opusculi Epitomen continentes, Oxford, 1615, dedicated to Lawrence Humphrey, president of Magdalen College, Oxford, 1586.
