= Baldwin of Forde =

Archbishop of Canterbury from 1185 to 1190

Baldwin of Forde OCist
- Archbishop of Canterbury
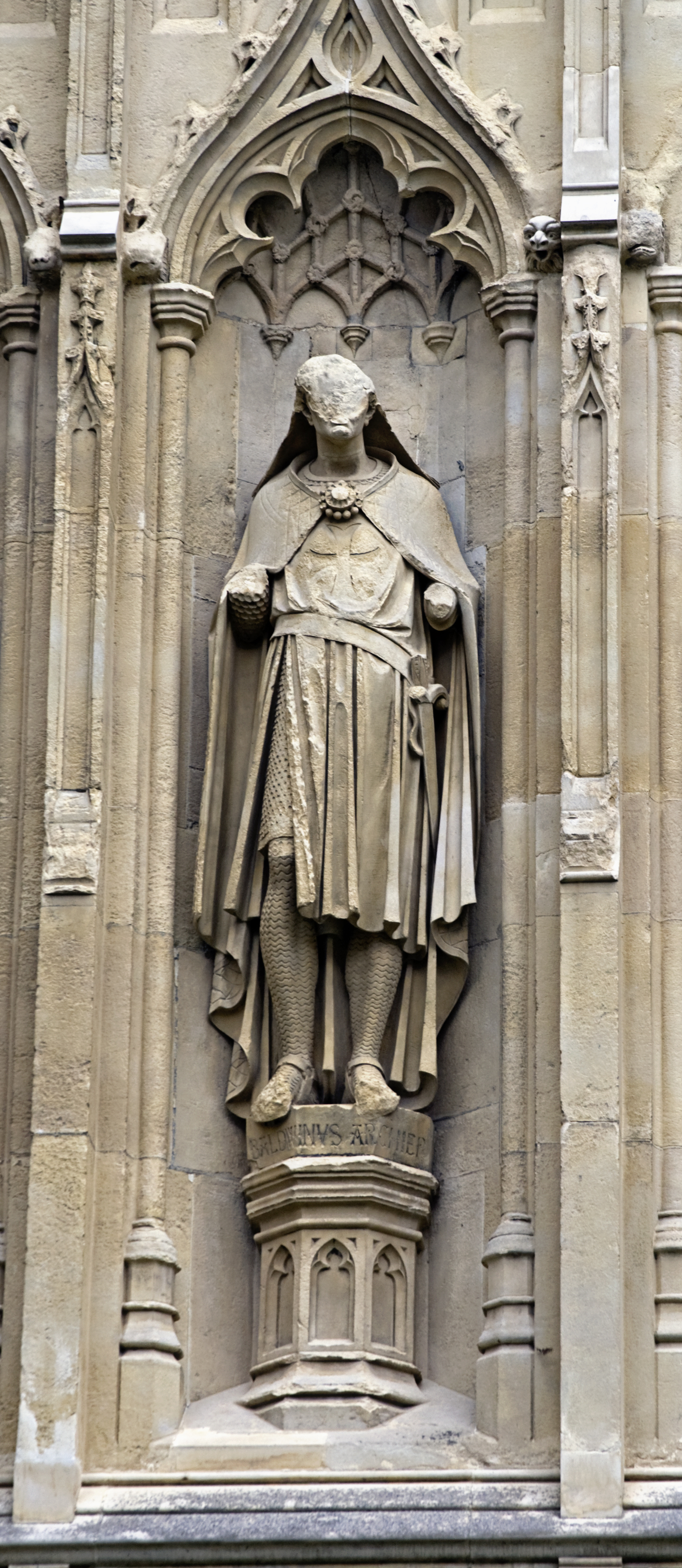
- Damaged statue of Baldwin of Forde from the exterior of Canterbury Cathedral
- Appointed: December 1184
- Term ended: 19 November 1190
- Predecessor: Richard of Dover
- Successor: Reginald fitzJocelin
- Other posts: Archdeacon of Totnes; Bishop of Worcester

Orders
- Consecration: c. 1180

Personal details
- Born: c. 1125 Exeter, Kingdom of England
- Died: 19 November 1190 near Acre, Kingdom of Jerusalem
- Parents: Hugh d'Eu

Baldwin of Forde or Ford (c. 1125 – 19 November 1190) was Archbishop of Canterbury between 1185 and 1190. The son of a clergyman, he studied canon law and theology at Bologna and was tutor to Pope Eugene III's nephew before returning to England to serve successive bishops of Exeter. After becoming a Cistercian monk, he was named abbot of his monastery at Forde and subsequently elected to the episcopate at Worcester. Before becoming a bishop, he wrote theological works and sermons, some of which have survived.

As a bishop, Baldwin came to the attention of King Henry II of England, who was so impressed that he insisted that Baldwin become archbishop. In that office, Baldwin quarrelled with his cathedral clergy over the founding of a church, which led to the imprisonment of the clergy in their cloister for more than a year. Baldwin spent some time in Wales with Gerald of Wales, preaching and raising money for the Third Crusade. After the coronation of Richard I of England, the new king sent Baldwin ahead to the Holy Land, where he became embroiled in the politics of the Kingdom of Jerusalem. Baldwin died in the Holy Land while participating in the crusade.

== Ecclesiastical career ==
Born in Exeter around 1125, Baldwin was the son of Hugh d'Eu, Archdeacon of Totnes, and a woman of unknown name who later became a nun. Gervase of Canterbury's story that he was from an even humbler background has been shown by modern scholarship to stem from bias on the part of the medieval chronicler. It is possible that he studied at Bologna in the 1150s with the future Pope Urban III. Robert Warelwast, who was Bishop of Exeter from 1138 to 1155, had sent Baldwin to Italy to study law. Baldwin was also said to have taught at Exeter, although this is not substantiated by any contemporary record. In 1150 or 1151 Pope Eugene III appointed him tutor to Eugene's nephew. By 1155, Baldwin seems to have returned to England, where he joined the household of Robert of Chichester, Bishop of Exeter.

Baldwin attracted the attention of Bartholomew Iscanus, Bishop of Exeter, who made him archdeacon at Totnes in about 1161, after Baldwin's father's death. (Note: Baldwin is often stated to have been Archdeacon of Exeter, instead of Totnes, but this is an error, probably stemming from the fact that John of Salisbury addressed him with that title. The general practice of the time, however, was to address all the archdeacons of a diocese as archdeacons of that diocese, rather than by their more specific territorial title.) Baldwin was known as a canon lawyer during his holding of Totnes. He received a letter from John of Salisbury in 1167, complaining about Bartholomew's conduct during the Becket controversy. John accused Bartholomew of not properly supporting Thomas Becket the Archbishop of Canterbury in his dispute with the king, urging Baldwin to influence the bishop to increase his support, and not to sign any appeal by the English bishops against Becket. Other letters from John dealt with rumours concerning Roger, the Bishop of Worcester, who John had heard was speaking badly of Becket. John's purpose seems to have been to have Baldwin pass along a warning from Becket to Roger about his behaviour; John was a supporter of Becket's during the latter's exile. In 1169 Baldwin was once again peripherally involved in the Becket dispute, when he objected to Becket's excommunication of a number of noblemen and clergy for opposing Becket's cause. Baldwin's objection was not so much that they were excommunicated, but that no warning had been given that such an action was contemplated.

Baldwin became a monk in about 1170, and then abbot of the Cistercian monastery of Forde. He was well known as a canonist, and often acted as a judge-delegate for the papacy, hearing cases that had reached the Roman Curia and been remanded to local experts for decision. In 1166, Baldwin was the addressee of a work by John of Salisbury, Expectiatione longa, which was one of the tracts written during the Becket controversy. It was probably at this time that Baldwin wrote De sacramento altaris. In 1175 he served with his old bishop, Bartholomew, as joint papal judge in a dispute between Malmesbury Abbey and Josceline de Bohon, the Bishop of Salisbury. In 1178 he was recommended to Pope Alexander as a possible candidate for a cardinalship, but this never occurred.

Baldwin became Bishop of Worcester on 10 August 1180. While at Worcester, he impressed King Henry II by intervening in a secular case to prevent a hanging on a Sunday. Although the medieval writer Walter Map said that Baldwin was determined to continue writing even after his election to the bishopric, none of Baldwin's writings can be dated to his time as bishop except for one sermon.

== Archbishop of Canterbury ==
Baldwin was translated from the see of Worcester to the see of Canterbury in December 1184, after Henry II let it be known that he would accept only Baldwin at Canterbury; the previous incumbent, Richard of Dover, had died in April that year. The monks put forward three candidates from within Christ Church Priory: Odo, who had been prior of Christ Church and was then Abbot of Battle Abbey, Peter de Leia, a Cluniac prior of Wenlock Priory and later Bishop of St David's, and Theobald, Abbot of Cluny, but none of them found favour with the English bishops. Instead, the prelates selected the king's choice, Baldwin. The selection of Baldwin took place only after a dispute between the members of the cathedral chapter of Canterbury and the suffragan bishops of Canterbury, both of whom claimed the right to elect the new archbishop.

Baldwin received his pallium from Pope Lucius III along with Lucius' approval of his translation. Baldwin was named a papal legate in 1185, although his authority was limited to his own archdiocese and did not extend into the Archdiocese of York.

=== Dispute with Christ Church Priory ===
During his time as archbishop, there was a dispute with the monks of Christ Church Priory in Canterbury, who resented Baldwin's attempts to impose stricter control over them and disputed the legitimacy of Baldwin's election. For his part, Baldwin did not approve of the luxurious and pampered life the monks of Christ Church lived, and felt that they profited too much from the cult of Thomas Becket.

The dispute escalated when Baldwin deprived the monks of some of the revenues of their monastic estates. After that, Baldwin proposed to establish a church dedicated to Becket in Canterbury itself, staffed by secular rather than monastic clergy. The monks of the cathedral chapter saw this proposed foundation as the first step in an attempt to change the see of Canterbury from a monastic cathedral chapter, a peculiarity of the English Church, to the more normal pattern of secular clergy. It is not clear if Baldwin himself intended such a plan, but the other bishops supported the effort, as contemporary writers made clear. Baldwin sought the advice of Hugh, the Bishop of Lincoln, who advised Baldwin to abandon the plan as it would only cause distress to all parties. The controversy was long and involved; at one point, the monks were imprisoned within their own buildings for a year and a half, from January 1188 to August 1189. This led to the suspension of the liturgy in the cathedral. Eventually, all the prominent ecclesiastics and monastic houses of Europe were forced into choosing sides in the dispute. In October 1189, in an attempt to gain control, Baldwin appointed Roger Norreys as the chapter's prior, an appointment widely acknowledged by contemporaries as placing an unfit individual in the office. (Note: The monks opposed his appointment, and contemporary writers are universal in their condemnation of his morals.) His plan for financing the church involved soliciting contributions from donors by promising a one-third reduction in penances for annual donations.

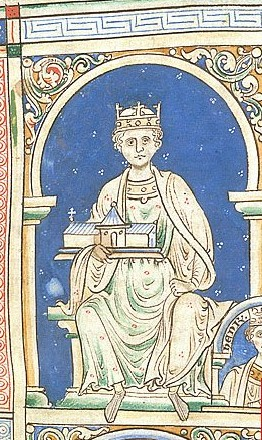
King Henry II of England

=== Service to King Henry ===
In 1188, King Henry II of England called for a tax to support the Third Crusade, following the fall of Jerusalem to Saladin in 1187. It was collected at the rate of a tenth of all the property and income of any person not vowing to go on crusade. It was popularly known as the "Saladin tithe" and was the most extensive tax ever collected in England up to that point. Being a tithe and not a secular tax, it was collected by dioceses rather than by shires. Baldwin, especially, was blamed for its harshness, although in February, along with his advisor Peter of Blois, he was in Normandy with the king.

Baldwin took the cross, or vowed to go on crusade, along with King Henry and many others in January 1188, or when he began his preaching campaign on 11 February 1188 to drum up support for the Third Crusade. According to the archbishop's secretary, Peter of Blois, Baldwin was initially opposed to joining the crusade, but was persuaded by Peter to take the cross and to preach the crusade, arguing that it was the archbishop's duty to defend "the vineyard of the Lord of Hosts". Baldwin preached the crusade with Gilbert of Glanville, bishop of Rochester, at Henry's council at Geddington and in April 1188, Baldwin was in Wales on a tour attempting to secure support for the king's crusade, and was forcing his servants and followers to exercise on foot up and down hills in preparation for the journey to the Holy Land. He spent most of the year in Wales, preaching the crusade, accompanied by the chronicler Gerald of Wales. (Note: Gerald wrote up the events of the tour as Itinerarium Kambriae, or Journey through Wales, written in 1191. The historian Christopher Tyerman says of Gerald's work that it is an "invaluable if self-glorifying personal account".) Gerald claimed about 3000 recruits for the crusade from his and Baldwin's efforts in Wales, although he also suggested that Baldwin mainly embarked on the tour to avoid his dispute with the Canterbury monks.

Route of Baldwin's tour, as described by Gerald of Wales in his Itinerarium Kambriae

A side effect of Baldwin's tour of Wales was the implied assertion of royal authority in a section of Henry's domains that had always been somewhat fractious. Baldwin was also asserting his ecclesiastical authority over the Welsh bishops, especially when he made a point of celebrating mass at every Welsh cathedral; he was the first Archbishop of Canterbury to celebrate mass at St Asaph's Cathedral. Baldwin excommunicated the only Welsh prince who refused to appear before him and take the cross, Owain Cyfeiliog.

Baldwin was with King Henry shortly before the latter's death, taking part in unsuccessful efforts to negotiate a truce with Henry's heir, Prince Richard, who had rebelled against his father. After Henry's death, Richard sought and obtained absolution for the sin of disobedience to his father from both Baldwin and Walter de Coutances, Archbishop of Rouen. Baldwin, along with Coutances, was with Richard on 20 July 1189 at Rouen when the king was invested with the Duchy of Normandy. Baldwin crowned Richard at Westminster Abbey on 13 September 1189 in the first English coronation for which a detailed description survives.

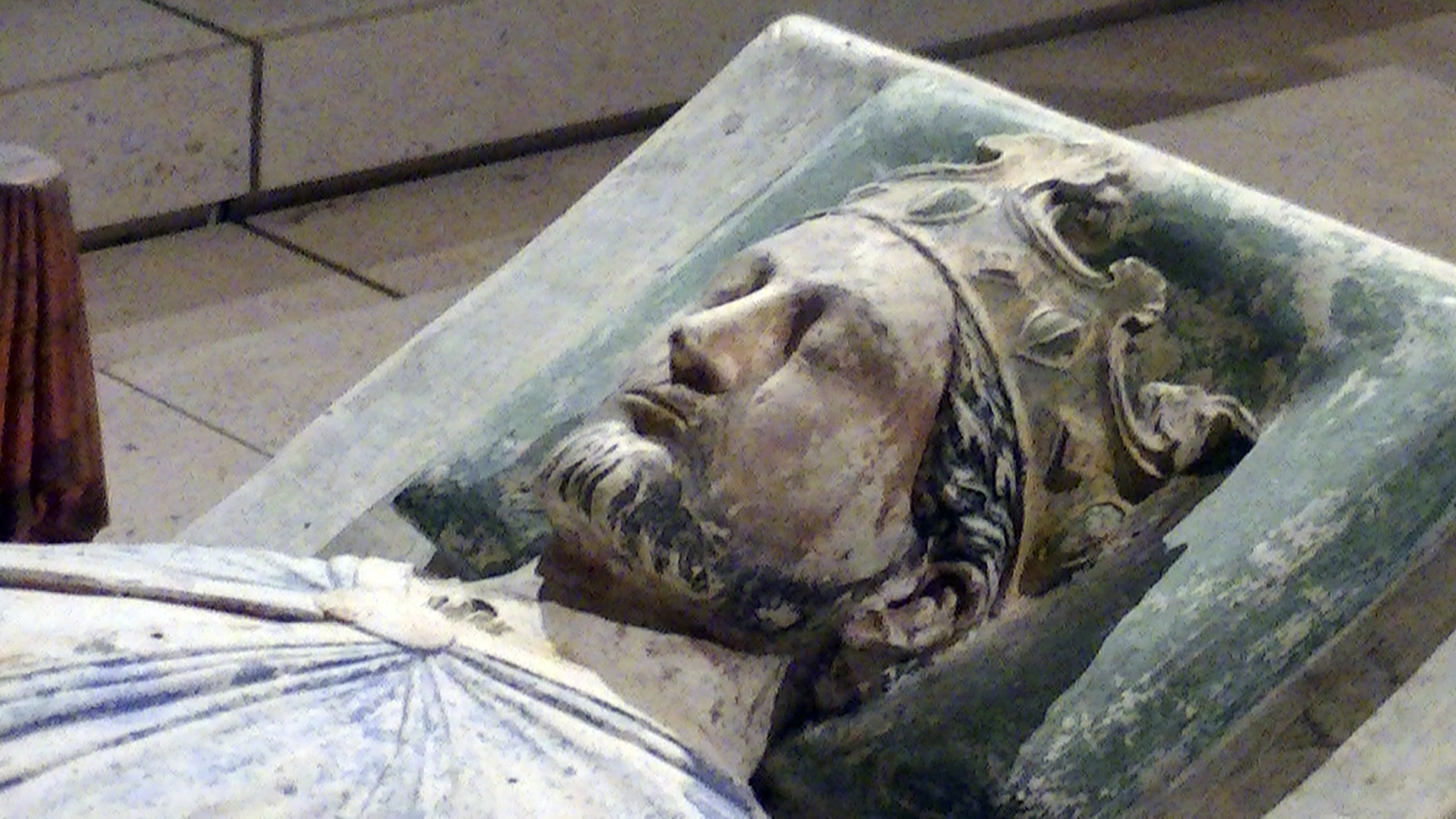
Baldwin crowned Richard I, shown on his effigy, in 1189.

=== Under Richard ===
After the death of Henry II and the accession of Richard as king, the monks of Christ Church Priory petitioned Richard to intercede in the long-running dispute between them and the archbishop. In November 1189, Richard and the whole court, including the Queen Mother Eleanor of Aquitaine, travelled to Canterbury in an attempt to end the controversy before the papacy became involved. Richard finally settled the dispute by persuading Baldwin to abandon his church-building project and to dismiss Norreys. Soon after this, Richard left England, and Baldwin declared that he was going to found the proposed church at Lambeth, and then join Richard on crusade. Both Richard and Baldwin agreed to appoint Norreys to Evesham Abbey, as the previous abbot of Evesham, Adam of Evesham, had recently died. This appointment eventually led, after Baldwin's death, to the Case of Evesham. In August 1189 Baldwin objected to the marriage of Prince John, later King John, to Isabel of Gloucester, on the grounds of consanguinity. John promised to obtain a papal dispensation, but never did so. Baldwin laid John's lands under interdict, but it was lifted by a papal legate who declared the marriage legal. Richard also restored to the archbishops of Canterbury the right to operate a mint, staffed by three moneyers.

== Third Crusade ==
In April 1190, Baldwin left England with Richard on the Third Crusade. Leading the English advance guard, Baldwin left Marseilles ahead of Richard together with Hubert Walter and Ranulf de Glanvill. The group sailed directly to Syria on 5 August 1190. Baldwin delegated the administration of his spiritualities and temporalities to Gilbert Glanvill, the Bishop of Rochester, but entrusted any archiepiscopal authority to Richard FitzNeal, the Bishop of London. The custom of giving the archiepiscopal authority to London had originated in Archbishop Lanfranc's time. (Note: This division of authority between Glanvill and FitzNeal caused a quarrel between the two men during the enthronement of Hubert Walter as archbishop in 1193.) Baldwin continued to conduct some ecclesiastical business, however, dealing with the suspended Hugh Nonant, the Bishop of Coventry. Baldwin had suspended Nonant in March 1190 for holding a secular office as sheriff, but after his departure, Baldwin wrote to FitzNeal that Nonant had agreed to relinquish his secular offices. (Note: Nonant appears to have never actually resigned the offices, as in June he was still negotiating with the king about his holding of a number of shires.)

Baldwin and his group arrived at Tyre on 16 September 1190. Richard did not arrive in Syria until 1191. It is unclear exactly why they were sent ahead of the king; perhaps it was to look out for the king's interests while Richard took a more leisurely route, or perhaps to rid the king's entourage of a family grouping around Glanvill that the king did not trust. Baldwin was not a member or close associate of the Glanvill faction, so most likely he was sent ahead to look after the king's interests, whatever the reasons for the inclusion of his companions. Another concern may have been to get help to the Kingdom of Jerusalem as quickly as possible after the king learned of Frederick Barbarossa's death on the way to the Holy Land.

When Baldwin arrived at Acre on 12 October 1190, (Note: The delay was caused, as Baldwin explained to the monks of Canterbury in a surviving letter, by the illness of some of his companions.) the Muslim forces in the city were under siege by the Frankish forces led by King Guy of Lusignan and Queen Sibylla of Jerusalem, who in turn were being besieged by Saladin. As joint commander of the Angevin advance force, Baldwin is described as leading some 200 knights and 300 men-at-arms under the banner of Saint Thomas Becket. Their arrival seemingly revitalised the besiegers' offensive spirit. On 12 November, immediately after the feast of Saint Martin, a significant crusader attack was launched. It is quite possible that the archbishop was already unwell and that participation in the offensive may have contributed to his death a week later. Alongside the other bishops, Baldwin absolved the crusaders before the attack and it is likely that he joined the Angevin forces and Templar knights that served as rearguard during the army's withdrawal on 13 November. Indeed, the Itinerarium peregrinorum et gesta regis Ricardi has the archbishop in the midst of the action, as he "fought amongst the rest, but he outstripped them all" in combat.

Soon after Baldwin's arrival, a succession crisis broke out in the Kingdom of Jerusalem. Sibylla, a first cousin of Henry II, and her two young daughters all died in July from an epidemic ravaging the siege camp where they were living. This left Guy without a legal claim to the kingdom as he had held the kingship through his wife. The heiress to the kingdom was Sibylla's half-sister Isabella; she was already married to Humphrey IV of Toron, but he was loyal to Guy and seems to have had no ambition to be king. A more promising candidate for the throne was Conrad of Montferrat, uncle of the last undisputed king, Baldwin V. Conrad had saved the kingdom from destruction by leading the successful defence of Tyre, and had the support of Isabella's mother Maria Comnena and stepfather Balian of Ibelin. Maria and Balian abducted Isabella from Humphrey and compelled her to seek an annulment so that she could be married to Conrad and enable him to claim the kingship.

Baldwin supported Guy's claim, but Ubaldo, Archbishop of Pisa, Philip of Dreux, Bishop of Beauvais, and Eraclius, Patriarch of Jerusalem, supported Conrad. Isabella and Humphrey's marriage was forcibly annulled. Baldwin, already ailing, attempted to excommunicate everyone involved in the annulment, but he died on 19 November 1190. He wrote his will shortly before his death and died surrounded by his followers on the crusade. Hubert Walter assumed the leadership of the English forces, and also became Baldwin's executor. Walter paid the wages of some soldiers and knights from Baldwin's estate and distributed the rest of the money to the poor.

== Writings and studies ==
De sacramento altaris, dealing with the eucharist and passover, is Baldwin's longest surviving work, in 12 manuscripts. It also includes a discussion of martyrdom that reads much like a vindication of Becket's status as a martyr. It was first printed in 1662, and has more recently been edited and published in the series Sources Chrétiennes, as volumes 93 and 94, in 1963. Other works include 22 sermons and a work on faith, De commendatione fidei, that only survives in two manuscripts, although another five are known to have existed. One of the missing manuscripts survived until at least the mid-1600s, as it served as the basis for the first printed edition of De commendatione fidei in 1662. The modern critical edition of De commendatione was published, along with the sermons, in 1991 as Balduini de Forda Opera: Sermones, De Commendatione Fidei, with the De commendatione fidei translated into English in 2000.

Renowned for his preaching, Baldwin's surviving sermons show that interest in them continued after his death. His sermons were first published in 1662; the modern edition includes two more (titled de obedientia and de sancta cruce) that were not in the original publication. It appears that originally there were 33 sermons, with the others now lost. The sermons survive in 12 manuscripts, although only 5 are collections of substantial numbers of the works. None of the surviving manuscripts has a complete collection of the 22 sermons. (Note: The surviving manuscripts are classified by David Bell, who edited them, into two groups: major and minor. The major ones are categorised by Bell as P, T, T^{1}, L, and C. The minor ones are S, A, Pr, P^{1}, P^{2}, Ca, and O. The P (P, P^{1}, and P^{2}) manuscripts are in Paris at the Bibliotheque Nationale. The T manuscripts (T and T^{1}) are in Troyes. The L manuscript is held at Lambeth Palace in London. The C manuscript is held by Pembroke College, Cambridge University. Among the minor manuscripts, the S manuscript is at Soissons, and the A manuscript is in Alencon. The Pr manuscript is held by Princeton University, and the Ca manuscript is in Cambrai. Lastly, the O manuscript is in the Bodleian Library at Oxford University.)

Baldwin also collaborated with Bartholomew Iscanus on a Liber penitentialis, which is jointly ascribed to both of them in a Lambeth Palace manuscript, MS 235. Another work often attributed to Baldwin, the Ad laudem Bartholomaei Exoniensis episcopi de coloribus rhetoricis, survives in three manuscripts and a fragment of a fourth. A number of other works are known to have been authored by Baldwin, but do not survive. These include Carmen devotionis, which was seen by John Bale at Glastonbury Abbey in the 16th century. Other lost works were a commentary on the biblical books of Samuel and Kings, De sectis haereticis which existed at Christ Church Priory in the 13th century, and De orthodoxis fidei dogmatibus, which was seen by John Leland at Christ Church in the 16th century. Some of Baldwin's letters existed in manuscript form, although they appear never to have circulated as a collection; they are no longer extant. One of his letters is mentioned in a Rievaulx Abbey catalogue, and Leland mentions others in his works.

Besides Baldwin's own writings, there is a decretal collection known as the Collectio Wigorniensis, still extant in manuscript (MS) form. It now resides in the British Library as Royal MS 10.A.ii. This collection may have belonged to Baldwin. It was probably compiled at Worcester Cathedral before December 1184, when Baldwin went to Canterbury, and besides a basic collection of Pope Alexander III's decretals, it includes a number of letters from the papacy addressed to Baldwin as Bishop of Worcester and as Archbishop of Canterbury. Although the main contents are unexceptional, the compiler of the work numbered the books and capitula into which the work was divided, an innovation that allowed for much more efficient use of the collection. It is likely that the compiler was one of Baldwin's clerks, and that this testified to Baldwin's continuing interest in canon law. The manuscript itself was likely owned either by Baldwin himself or a member of his household.

The historian Frank Barlow stated that Baldwin was "one of the greatest English decretalists". His work was more influential in his inspiration and support for the development of decretal collections, rather than in terms of the actual influence of his judicial decisions themselves. Another collection of writings associated with Baldwin is the correspondence relating to his dispute with the Christ Church monks. The documents relating to this dispute, which dragged on into the archbishopric of Hubert Walter, are published in one whole volume of the Rolls Series, which was edited by the Victorian historian William Stubbs.

== Reputation ==
Baldwin's long-running dispute with his cathedral chapter caused the chronicler Gervase of Canterbury to characterise him as "a greater enemy to Christianity than Saladin." Another contemporary, Gerald of Wales, praised Baldwin as "distinguished for his learning and religion", but also said he was gloomy and nervous. Herbert of Bosham dedicated his History of Thomas, a story of Thomas Becket, to the archbishop in the late 1180s. The historian A. L. Poole called Baldwin a "distinguished scholar and deeply religious man, [but he] was injudicious and too austere to be a good leader." Baldwin was also known as a theologian, as well as being a canon lawyer. His clerk and nephew, Joseph of Exeter, accompanied Baldwin on the crusade, and wrote two works after his return to England: Antiocheis, an epic poem about King Richard on crusade, and De Bello Trojano, a rewriting of the Trojan War.

== Citations ==
Catholic Church titles
Preceded by Roger of Worcester	Bishop of Worcester; 1180–1185	Succeeded by William of Northall
Preceded by Richard of Dover	Archbishop of Canterbury; 1185–1190	Succeeded by Reginald fitzJocelin
