= Lacertine =

Decorative animal elements in medieval art

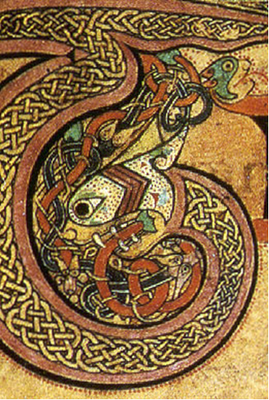
A detail of lacertine decorations from folio 124r in the Book of Kells

Lacertines, most commonly found in Celtic, Anglo-Saxon, and Insular art, are interlaces created by zoomorphic forms. While the term "lacertine" itself means "lizard-like," its use to describe interlace is a 19th-century neologism and not limited to interlace of reptilian forms. In addition to lizards, lacertine decoration often features animals such as birds, lions, and dogs.

Although examples of lacertine have been found in stone sculpture and architecture, such as in a fragment from the Church of St. Mary of the Rock, it is more comment to find lacertines in illuminated manuscripts. Notable examples of lacertine decoration can be found in the Book of Kells, Book of Durrow, the Lindisfarne Gospels, the Lichfield or St. Chad Gospels, and the Mac Durnan Gospels.
