= Bosel (disambiguation) =

Bosel or Bosal may refer to:

- Bösel, a municipality in the district of Cloppenburg, in Lower Saxony, Germany
- Bosel, medieval Bishop of Worcester.
- Otto Bösel (1913-1975), Hauptwachmeister in the Luftwaffe during World War II.
- Greta Bösel (1908-1947), German concentration camp guard, executed for war crimes
- Nasir Iqbal Bosal, Pakistani politician
- Bosal, Korean pronunciation for a bodhisattva.
- Bosal, a type of hackamore noseband, sometimes misspelled "bosel."
- Bozal Spanish, the Spanish spoken by negros bozales, slaves recently taken from Africa.
