= William Lenn =

14th-century Bishop of Chichester and Bishop of Worcester

- Bishop of Worcester
- Appointed: 11 October 1368
- Term ended: 18 November 1373
- Predecessor: William Wittlesey
- Successor: Henry Wakefield
- Previous posts: Bishop of Chichester; Dean of Chichester

Personal details
- Died: 18 November 1373
- Denomination: Catholic

William Lenn (also Lenne or de Lynn; died 1373) was a medieval bishop of Chichester and bishop of Worcester. The name Lenn was the old name for Lynn in Norfolk.

Lenn went to Rome in his early life and became a doctor of canon law. He was subsequently made an auditor of causes, in the holy court, by Pope Urban V.

In 1356 Lenn was made dean of Chichester Cathedral, then after the death of Bishop Stratford he was selected for the see of Chichester on 16 May 1362, and was consecrated about 18 August 1362.

Lenn's tenure at Chichester was quite short, but during that time he got into a quarrel with the earl of Arundel, Stephens suggests that it was probably a dispute over land. It seems that the bishop procured a citation from Pope Urban V ordering the earl to appear before a court, in Rome, to answer the charges laid against him. The earl treated the summons with contempt and refused to go. What the bishop was trying to do was seen as a violation of both the Statute of Praemunire and the canon law of England. The King, Edward III, was angry at the insult and summoned the bishop to attend the king's court, to account for his actions. The bishop, however, was in Rome at the time, but he was convicted in his absence, and all his goods and chattels seized, by the crown.

Lenn was translated to the see of Worcester on 11 October 1368 He died of a stroke, in that office on 18 November 1373, as he mounted a horse to go to London to attend Parliament.

== Citations ==
Catholic Church titles
Preceded by Robert Stratford	Bishop of Chichester; 1362–1368	Succeeded by William Reade
Preceded by William Wittlesey	Bishop of Worcester; 1368–1373	Succeeded by Walter Lyghe
