= Henry Wakefield =

Henry Wakefield may refer to:

- Henry Wakefield (bishop of Worcester) (died 1395), medieval bishop of Worcester
- Henry Wakefield (bishop of Birmingham) (1854–1933), Anglican bishop and author
- Henry Wakefield (American football) (1899–1962), American football player
