= John de Pageham =

12th-century Bishop of Worcester

- Bishop of Worcester
- Appointed: 1151
- Term ended: 1157
- Predecessor: Simon of Worcester
- Successor: Alured
- Previous post: Clerk of Theobald of Bec

Orders
- Ordination: 3 March 1151
- Consecration: 4 March 1151

Personal details
- Died: 1157
- Denomination: Catholic

John de Pageham (or John of Pageham) was a medieval Bishop of Worcester.

== Life ==
John was a clerk of Theobald of Bec, Archbishop of Canterbury before he was selected to become bishop. He was ordained a priest on 3 March 1151. He was consecrated on 4 March 1151. He died in 1157, possibly in December.

== Citations ==
Catholic Church titles
Preceded by Simon of Worcester	Bishop of Worcester; 1151–1157	Succeeded by Alured
