= John St German =

14th-century Bishop of Worcester-elect

- Bishop of Worcester-elect
- Church: Catholic Church
- Elected: 25 March 1302
- Quashed: 17 October 1302
- Predecessor: Godfrey Giffard
- Successor: William Gainsborough

Orders
- Consecration: never consecrated

John St German was a medieval Bishop of Worcester-elect. He was elected on 25 March 1302 but his election was quashed on 17 October 1302 before he was consecrated.

== Citations ==
Catholic Church titles
Preceded by Godfrey de Giffard	Bishop of Worcester election quashed 1302	Succeeded by William Gainsborough
