= Simon of Worcester =

12th-century Bishop of Worcester

Simon
- Bishop of Worcester
- Elected: c. 29 March 1125
- Term ended: 20 March 1150
- Predecessor: Theulf
- Successor: John de Pageham
- Previous post: Queen's chaplain

Orders
- Ordination: 23 May 1125
- Consecration: 24 May 1125 by William de Corbeil

Personal details
- Died: 20 March 1150
- Denomination: Catholic

Simon was a medieval Bishop of Worcester.

== Life ==
Simon was a chaplain and chancellor of Adeliza of Louvain, the second wife of King Henry I of England, before being elected to the see of Worcester about 29 March 1125. He was ordained a priest on 23 May 1125 and consecrated on 24 May 1125, at Canterbury by the archbishop, William de Corbeil. He died about 20 March 1150. Prior to his election, the monks of the cathedral chapter had appealed to William de Corbeil, Archbishop of Canterbury and to William Giffard, Bishop of Winchester, for help in securing a free election, but in the end they accepted Simon's appointment by King Henry I of England. Although he was not a monk, Simon became popular with his monks.

== Citations ==
Catholic Church titles
| Preceded by Theulf | Bishop of Worcester; 1125–1150 | Succeeded by John de Pageham |
