= Thomas Hemenhale =

14th-century Bishop of Norwich and Bishop of Worcester

- Bishop of Worcester
- Term ended: 30 March 1337 (death)
- Predecessor: Simon Montacute
- Successor: Wulstan Bransford
- Other post: Bishop of Norwich-elect (1336–1337)

Orders
- Consecration: 30 March 1337

Personal details
- Died: 21 December 1338
- Denomination: Roman Catholic

Thomas Hemenhale (or Thomas Hempnall) was a medieval Bishop of Norwich-elect and then Bishop of Worcester.

Hemenhale was elected to the see of Norwich on 6 April 1336 but was transferred to the see of Worcester on 14 March 1337 before he was consecrated at Norwich.

Hemenhale was consecrated as Bishop of Worcester on 30 March 1337. He died on 21 December 1338.

== Citations ==
Catholic Church titles
Preceded by William Ayermin	Bishop of Norwich; 1336–1337	Succeeded by Antony Bek
Preceded by Simon Montacute	Bishop of Worcester; 1337–1338	Succeeded by Wulstan Bransford
