= Koenwald =

10th-century Bishop of Worcester

- Bishop of Worcester
- Appointed: between 16 April 928 and 15 October 929
- Term ended: 958 or 959
- Predecessor: Wilfrith II
- Successor: St. Dunstan

Orders
- Consecration: between 16 April 928 and 15 October 929

Personal details
- Died: 958 or 959
- Denomination: Christian

Koenwald or Cenwald or Coenwald (floruit 928–958) was an Anglo-Saxon Bishop of Worcester, probably of Mercian origin.

== Life ==
Koenwald succeeded Bishop Wilfrith at some time between 16 April 928, when Wilfrith is last known to have witnessed a charter, and 15 October 929, when Koenwald was recorded as arriving as a bishop at the Abbey of St Gall, which was then in the Holy Roman Empire.

Before he became bishop, Koenwald seems to have been a priest in the household of King Æthelstan. In the autumn of 929 he visited Germany. His visit was only recorded in a manuscript at St Gall, where it is described as a tour of German monasteries. In 929 the German King Henry the Fowler sought a wife for his son, the future Holy Roman Emperor Otto, from the English court. In response Æthelstan sent two of his half-sisters for the prince to choose between, and in late 929 or early 930 Otto married Eadgyth. It is likely that Koenwald had been sent by Æthelstan to Germany to accompany the sisters. He seems to have been given silver by Æthelstan to distribute in Germany, and while at St Gall, he was received into the confraternity of that monastery, and asked at that time that his king as well as a number of his fellow English bishops be also entered into the monastery's confraternity.

Koenwald's visit to St. Gall and to Reichenau is thought to be connected to the rise of the monastic reform movement in 10th century England. Dunstan and Æthelwold of Winchester, the leading ecclesiastical proponents of reform, were associated with Athelstan's court, and Dunstan would eventually succeed Koenwald. Several charters witnessed by Koenwald also describe him as monk, as well as bishop, "suggesting a respect for the condition which set him apart from other bishops".

Koenwald appears to have been responsible for the "alliterative charters" which were issued between 940 and 956. These are described as "drawn up in a self-consciously 'literary' style (replete with alliterative and rhythmical phrases)". These have some features of earlier charters of King Athelstan, from the period 928–935, with which Koenwald may also be associated. The author of some of these may be one Ælfric, later a priest and deacon in the service of Bishop Oswald of Worcester, a strong supporter of Dunstan, and the monastic reform movement. The difficult Latin entry inserted into the Mac Durnan Gospels, which Æthelstan donated to Christ Church, Canterbury, has been ascribed to Koenwald and may be seen as a prelude to the convoluted style of this alliterative group.

Koenwald was succeeded by Dunstan in 958 or 959. Keynes quotes John of Worcester's Chronicle where Koenwald is called "a man of great humility". The year of his death is not known, but the date, and a further link between Koenwald and Dunstan, may have been kept in the records of Glastonbury Abbey. Bishop Koenwald, a monk of Glastonbury, was commemorated on 28 June, the anniversary of his death.

The Handbook of British Chronology, gives Koenwald's death date as 28 June 957 or 958, but according to Simon Keynes, he witnessed a charter issued by King Edgar in 958 and was succeeded in that or the following year by Dunstan.

== Citations ==
Christian titles
Preceded by Wilfrith II	Bishop of Worcester c. 929–c. 957	Succeeded by Dunstan
