= Theulf =

Bishop of Worcester (died 1123)

- Bishop of Worcester
- Term ended: 20 October 1123
- Predecessor: Samson
- Successor: Simon of Worcester
- Previous post: Canon of Bayeux

Orders
- Consecration: 27 June 1115

Personal details
- Died: 20 October 1123
- Denomination: Catholic

Theulf (died 20 October 1123) was a medieval Bishop of Worcester.

== Life ==
Theulf was a canon of Bayeux Cathedral and a king's chaplain before he was nominated to the see of Worcester on 28 December 1113. The archbishopric of Canterbury was then vacant and his consecration as bishop was delayed until 27 June 1115 when Archbishop Ralph d'Escures received his pallium from Rome and was thus empowered to perform the ceremony. Theulf died on 20 October 1123. The medieval chronicler William of Malmesbury claimed that Theulf confessed on his deathbed that he had purchased his bishopric.

== Citations ==
Catholic Church titles
Preceded by Samson	Bishop of Worcester; 1113–1123	Succeeded by Simon of Worcester
