= Alured =

12th-century Bishop of Worcester

- Bishop of Worcester
- Appointed: 1158
- Term ended: 31 July 1160
- Predecessor: John de Pageham
- Successor: Roger of Worcester
- Previous post: Royal clerk

Orders
- Consecration: c. 13 April 1158

Personal details
- Died: 31 July 1160
- Denomination: Catholic

Alured (or Alfred) was a medieval Bishop of Worcester.

== Life ==
Alured was a clerk of King Henry, probably Henry II of England. He was consecrated about 13 April 1158. He died on 31 July 1160.

== Citations ==
Catholic Church titles
| Preceded by John de Pageham | Bishop of Worcester; 1158–1160 | Succeeded by Roger of Worcester |
