= Walter Lyghe =

14th-century Bishop of Worcester-elect

- Bishop of Worcester-elect
- Elected: 7 December 1373
- Quashed: c. 12 September 1375
- Predecessor: William Lenn
- Successor: Henry Wakefield

Orders
- Consecration: never consecrated

Personal details
- Denomination: Catholic

Walter Lyghe was a medieval Bishop of Worcester elect. He was elected on 7 December 1373 but his election was quashed on about 12 September 1375.

== Citations ==
Catholic Church titles
Preceded by William Lenn	Bishop of Worcester election quashed 1373–1375	Succeeded by Henry Wakefield
