= Milred =

8th-century Bishop of Worcester

- Bishop of Worcester
- Appointed: between 743 and 745
- Term ended: 774
- Predecessor: Wilfrith I
- Successor: Waermund

Orders
- Consecration: between 743 and 745

Personal details
- Died: 774
- Denomination: Christian

Milred (died 774) (also recorded as Mildred and Hildred) was an Anglo-Saxon prelate who served as Bishop of Worcester from c. 744 until his death in 774.

== Life ==
Milred was consecrated between 743 and 745. He attended the major council of Clofesho in 747, and is found as a regular witness to charters of the Mercian kings Æthelbald and Offa. Milred is known to have travelled to Germany, where he met Boniface and Lull, in the early 750s. A letter from Milred to Lull written soon after his return, on the subject of Boniface's martyrdom shows that the writer was familiar with the works of Virgil and Horace.

A work by Milred, a compilation of epigrams and epigraphs on Anglo-Saxon churchmen, some of whom are known only from this work, is now lost apart from a single 10th-century copy of one page, held by the library of the University of Illinois at Urbana-Champaign. Antiquarian John Leland recorded some other parts of this work, which now survive only in his 16th-century copies.

Milred died in 774, and the event is recorded in the Anglo-Saxon Chronicle.

== Bibliography ==
- Lapidge, M., "Milred", in Michael Lapidge et al., The Blackwell Encyclopedia of Anglo-Saxon England. Blackwell, 1999. ISBN 0-631-22492-0

Christian titles
| Preceded by Wilfrith I | Bishop of Worcester c. 744 – 774 | Succeeded by Waermund |
