= Heathured of Worcester =

8th-century Bishop of Worcester

Heathured
- Bishop of Worcester
- Appointed: 781
- Term ended: either 798 or 800
- Predecessor: Tilhere
- Successor: Denebeorht

Orders
- Consecration: 781

Personal details
- Died: either 798 or 800
- Denomination: Christian

Heathured or Hathored was a medieval Bishop of Worcester. He was consecrated in 781. He died either in 798 or perhaps in 800.

== Citations ==
Christian titles
Preceded by Tilhere	Bishop of Worcester; 781–c. 799	Succeeded by Denebeorht
