= Roger of Worcester =

12th-century Bishop of Worcester

Roger
- Bishop of Worcester
- Appointed: 1163
- Term ended: 9 or 10 August 1179
- Predecessor: Alured
- Successor: Baldwin

Orders
- Ordination: 23 August 1163
- Consecration: 23 August 1163 by Thomas Becket

Personal details
- Born: c. 1134
- Died: 9 or 10 August 1179 Tours
- Denomination: Catholic

Roger of Worcester (c. 1134 – 9 August 1179) was Bishop of Worcester from 1163 to 1179. He had a role in the controversy between his cousin Henry II of England and Archbishop Thomas Becket.

== Life ==
Roger's father was Robert, 1st Earl of Gloucester. Roger was a younger son and he was educated for a short period with the future king, Henry II. Roger was afterwards ordained priest, and consecrated Bishop of Worcester by Thomas Becket, on 23 August 1163. He was consecrated at Canterbury. He adhered loyally to Thomas, and though one of the bishops sent to the pope to carry the king's appeal against the archbishop, he took no active part in the embassy, nor did he join the appeal made by the bishops against the archbishop in 1166, thus arousing the enmity of the king.

When Thomas desired Roger to join him in his exile, Roger went without leave in 1167, Henry having refused him permission. He boldly reproached the king when they met at Falaise in 1170, and a reconciliation followed. After the martyrdom of St. Thomas, England was threatened with an interdict, but Roger interceded with the pope and was thereafter highly esteemed in England and at Rome. Pope Alexander III, who frequently employed him as delegate in ecclesiastical causes, spoke of him and Bartholomew Iscanus Bishop of Exeter as "the two great lights of the English Church".

== Death ==
Roger died on 9 August 1179 or on 10 August. His death was commemorated on 9 August.

== Citations ==
Preceded by Alured	Bishop of Worcester; 1163–1179	Succeeded by Baldwin
