= William of Northall =

12th-century Bishop of Worcester

- Bishop of Worcester
- Elected: c. 25 May 1186
- Term ended: 2 or 3 May 1190
- Predecessor: Baldwin
- Successor: Robert FitzRalph
- Previous post: Archdeacon of Gloucester

Orders
- Consecration: 21 September 1186

Personal details
- Died: 2 or 3 May 1190
- Denomination: Catholic

William of Northall (or William of Northolt) was a mediaeval Bishop of Worcester.

William was a clerk of Theobald of Bec, Archbishop of Canterbury and of Richard of Dover, also Archbishop of Canterbury. He held a prebend in the diocese of London and was Archdeacon of Gloucester from 1177 or 1178.

William was elected to the see of Worcester about 25 May 1186 and consecrated on 21 September 1186. He died on 2 or 3 May 1190. His death was commemorated on 3 May.

== Citations ==
Catholic Church titles
Preceded by Baldwin	Bishop of Worcester; 1186–1190	Succeeded by Robert FitzRalph
