= Oftfor =

7th-century Bishop of Worcester

- Bishop of Worcester
- Appointed: 691
- Term ended: after 693
- Predecessor: Bosel
- Successor: Egwin

Orders
- Consecration: 691

Personal details
- Died: after April 693
- Denomination: Christian

Oftfor was a medieval Bishop of Worcester. He was consecrated in 691. He died after April 693.

== Citations ==
Christian titles
Preceded by Bosel	Bishop of Worcester; 691–after 693	Succeeded by Egwin
