= Denebeorht =

9th-century Bishop of Worcester

- Bishop of Worcester
- Appointed: c. 800
- Term ended: 822
- Predecessor: Heathured
- Successor: Heahbeorht

Orders
- Consecration: c. 800

Personal details
- Died: 822
- Denomination: Christian

Denebeorht (or Deneberht) was a medieval Bishop of Worcester. He was consecrated perhaps in 800. He died in 822.

== Citations ==
Christian titles
Preceded by Heathured	Bishop of Worcester c. 800–822	Succeeded by Heahbeorht
