= Werferth =

9th and 10th-century Bishop of Worcester

- Bishop of Worcester
- Appointed: either in 872 or between 869 and 872
- Term ended: either in 915 or between 907 and 915
- Predecessor: Ealhhun
- Successor: Æthelhun

Orders
- Consecration: either in 872 or between 869 and 872

Personal details
- Died: either in 915 or between 907 and 915
- Denomination: Christian

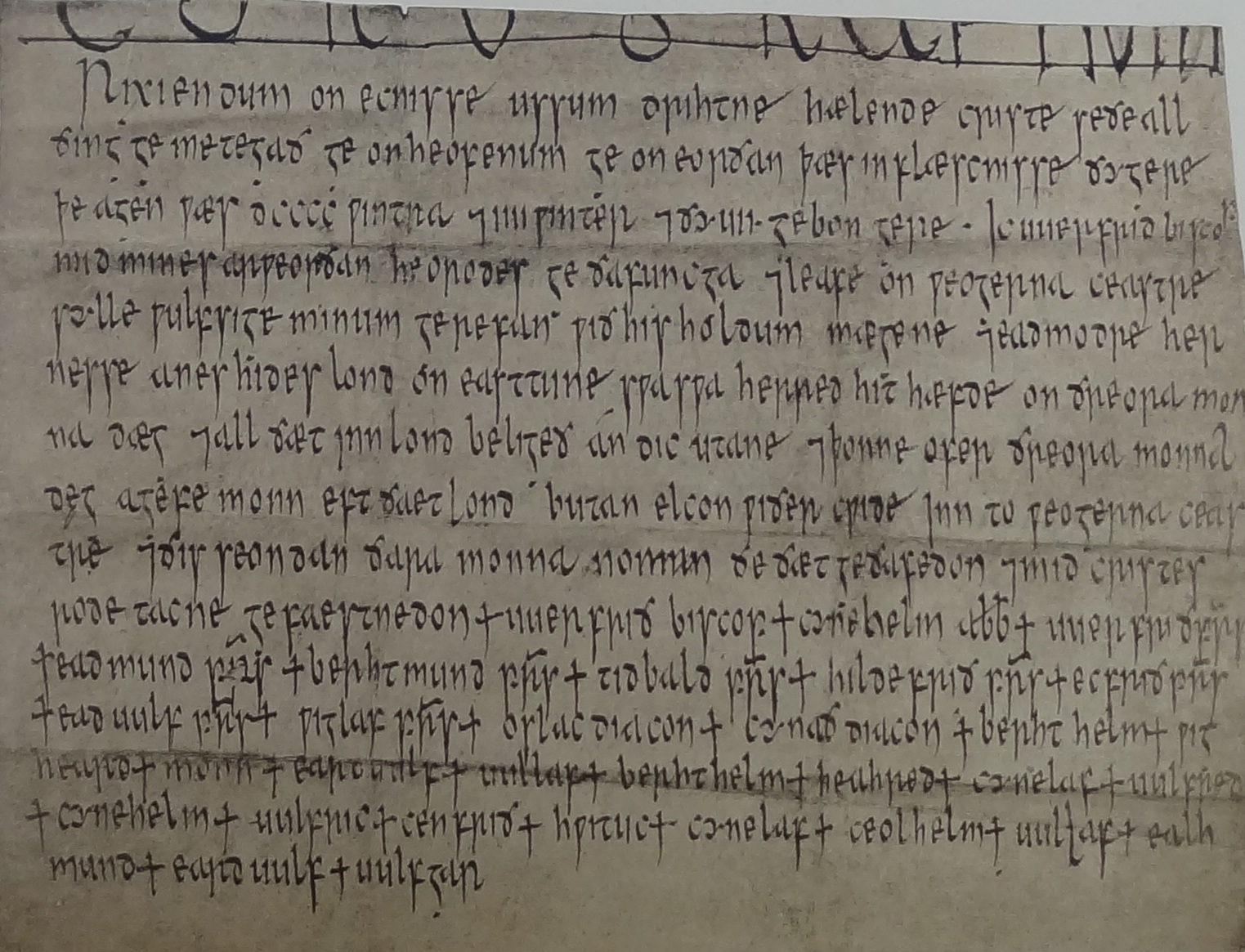
Charter S 1281 dated 904, grant of Bishop Werferth to his reeve, Wulfsige

Werferth (Note: Also Wærferth, Werfrith, or Waerfrith) was an English bishop of Worcester.

Werferth was consecrated either in 872 or between 869 and 872. A contemporary and friend of Alfred the Great, he was a significant translator, from Latin into Old English. His translations include the Dialogues of Gregory, commissioned by Alfred. He died either in 915 or between 907 and 915.

== Citations ==
Christian titles
Preceded by Ealhhun	Bishop of Worcester c. 873–c. 912	Succeeded by Æthelhun
