= Henry de Sully (bishop of Worcester) =

12th-century Bishop of Worcester

- Bishop of Worcester
- Elected: 4 December 1193
- Term ended: October 1195
- Predecessor: Robert FitzRalph
- Successor: John of Coutances
- Previous post: Abbot of Glastonbury

Orders
- Consecration: 12 December 1193

Personal details
- Died: 23 or 24 October 1195
- Denomination: Roman Catholic

Henry de Sully (or Henry de Soilli) (d. 23 or 24 October 1195) was a medieval monk, Bishop of Worcester and Abbot of Glastonbury.

Henry became prior of Bermondsey Abbey in 1186. In September 1189, following the death of Henry II of England, Richard I of England appointed him Abbot of Glastonbury. It was while he was Abbot that Glastonbury claimed to find the body of King Arthur around 1191. He was elected to the see of Worcester on 4 December 1193 and consecrated on 12 December 1193. He died on 23 or 24 October 1195.

== Citations ==
Catholic Church titles
Preceded by Peter de Marcy	Abbot of Glastonbury; 1189–1193	Succeeded by Savaric FitzGeldewin
Preceded by Robert FitzRalph	Bishop of Worcester; 1193–1195	Succeeded by John of Coutances
