= William Gainsborough =

14th-century Bishop of Worcester

- Bishop of Worcester
- Church: Catholic Church
- Appointed: 22 October 1302
- Term ended: 17 September 1307
- Predecessor: John St German
- Successor: Walter Reynolds

Orders
- Consecration: 28 October 1302

Personal details
- Died: 17 September 1307
- Denomination: Catholic

William Gainsborough was a medieval Bishop of Worcester. He was nominated on 22 October 1302 and consecrated on 28 October 1302. He died on 17 September 1307.

He was a Franciscan and had been Minister Provincial (head of the order) in England from 1285 to 1292

== Citations ==
Catholic Church titles
| Preceded by John St German | Bishop of Worcester; 1302–1307 | Succeeded by Walter Reynolds |
