= Æthelhun =

10th-century Bishop of Worcester

- Bishop of Worcester
- Appointed: either in 915 or between 907 and 915
- Term ended: either in 922 or between 915 and 922
- Predecessor: Waerfrith
- Successor: Wilfrith II

Orders
- Consecration: either in 915 or between 907 and 915

Personal details
- Died: either in 922 or between 915 and 922
- Denomination: Christian

Æthelhun was a medieval Bishop of Worcester. He was consecrated either in 915 or between 907 and 915. He died either in 922 or between 915 and 922.

== Citations ==
Christian titles
Preceded by Waerfrith	Bishop of Worcester c. 915–c. 922	Succeeded by Wilfrith II
