= Robert Tideman of Winchcombe =

14th-century Bishop of Worcester and Bishop of Llandaff

- Bishop of Worcester
- Appointed: 15 June 1395
- Term ended: 13 June 1401
- Predecessor: Henry Wakefield
- Successor: Richard Clifford
- Previous posts: Bishop of Llandaff; 1393–1395

Orders
- Consecration: 13 October 1393

Personal details
- Died: 13 June 1401
- Denomination: Roman Catholic

Robert Tideman (often Robert Tideman of Winchcombe) was a medieval Bishop of Llandaff and Bishop of Worcester.

Tideman was consecrated Bishop of Llandaff on 13 October 1393 and translated to the see of Worcester on 15 June 1395.

Tideman enjoyed influence at the court of King Richard II of England.

Tideman died on 13 June 1401.

Catholic Church titles
Preceded by Edmund Bromfeld	Bishop of Llandaff; 1393–1395	Succeeded by Andrew Barret
Preceded by Henry Wakefield	Bishop of Worcester; 1395–1401	Succeeded by Richard Clifford
