= Ealhhun =

9th-century Bishop of Worcester

- Bishop of Worcester
- Appointed: between either 843 or December 844 and November 845
- Term ended: between 869 and 872
- Predecessor: Heahbeorht
- Successor: Waerfrith

Orders
- Consecration: between either 843 or December 844 and November 845

Personal details
- Died: between 869 and 872
- Denomination: Christian

Ealhhun or Alhhun was a medieval Bishop of Worcester. He was consecrated between either 843 or December 844 and November 845. He died between 869 and 872.

== Citations ==
Christian titles
Preceded by Heahbeorht	Bishop of Worcester c. 844–c. 871	Succeeded by Waerfrith
