= Mac Durnan Gospels =

9th or 10th century manuscript

- London, Lambeth Palace MS 1370
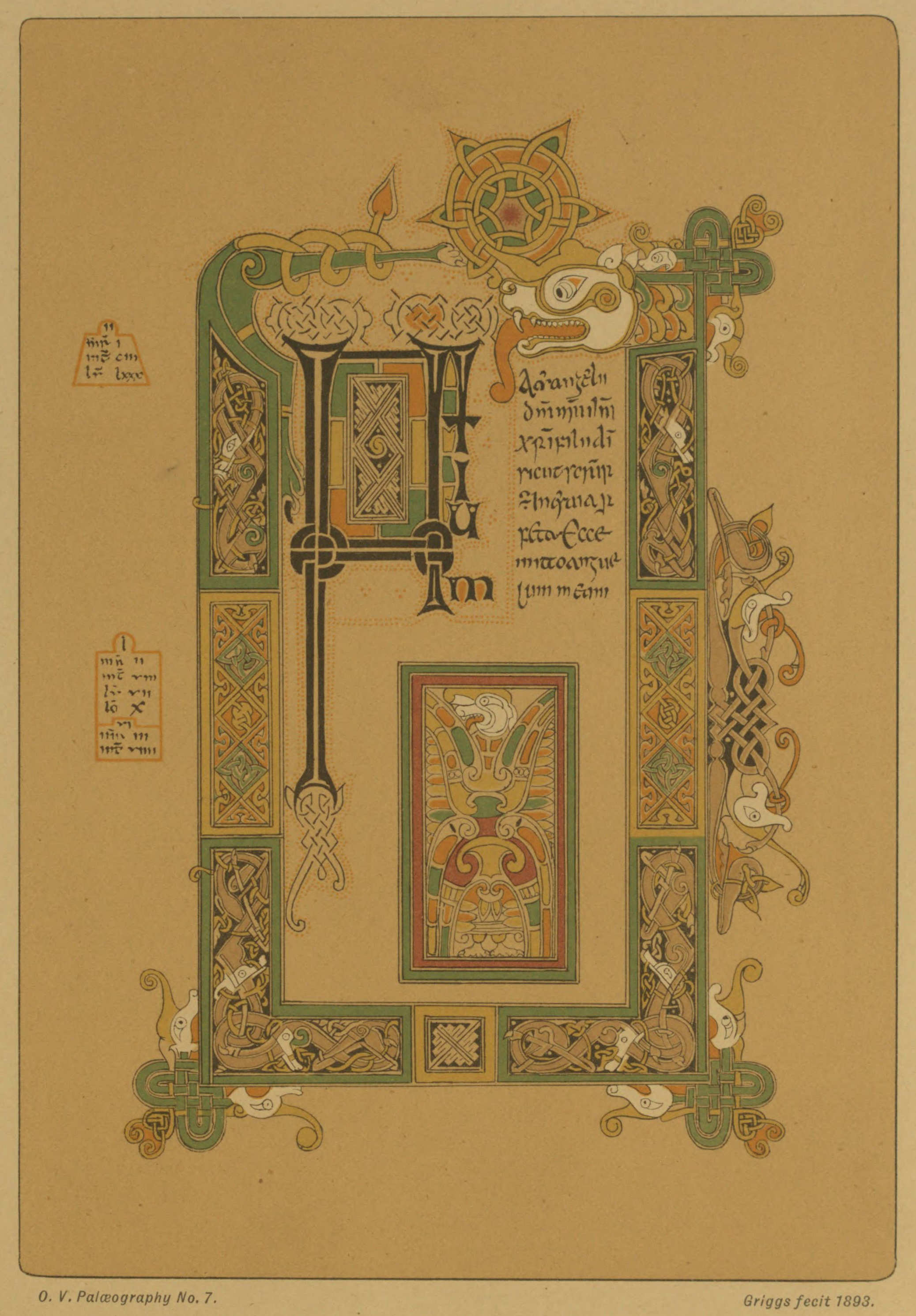
- Mark 1:1 in the Mac Durnan Gospels
- Also known as: Book of Mac Durnan
- Type: Gospels
- Date: late 9th century (or early 10th)
- Place of origin: Ireland
- Scribe(s): unknown, possibly Máel Brigte mac Tornáin
- Material: Parchment
- Size: 15.8cm x 11.1cm
- Script: Irish minuscule script
- Illumination: portraits of the Evangelists
- Additions: f. 3v: metrical inscription in square capitals

The Mac Durnan Gospels or Book of Mac Durnan (London, Lambeth Palace MS 1370) is an illuminated manuscript Gospel book made in Ireland in the 9th or 10th century, a rather late example of Insular art. Unusually, it was in Anglo-Saxon England soon after it was written, and is now in the collection of Lambeth Palace Library in London.

It contains the four gospels of Matthew, Mark, Luke and John, without the usual prefatory matter, and has a full-page evangelist portrait of each. There is an opening quasi-carpet page with the four evangelists' symbols in panels around a cross, and some elaborately decorated incipit pages.

== Manuscript history ==
Information concerning the provenance and history of the manuscript comes from an alliterative Latin inscription which was added on folio 3v, possibly by Koenwald (d. 957/8), later bishop of Worcester. It suggests that the manuscript was written or commissioned by Máel Brigte mac Tornáin (d. 927), known as Mac Durnan, abbot of Armagh since 888, who is said to have dedicated the book to God. Rearranged in regular metre, the inscription reads:

Mæielbriðus		MacDurnani
istum textum		per triquadrum
Deo digne		dogmatizat
	ast
Æthelstanus		Anglosæxna
rex et rector		Doruernensi
metropoli		dat per æuum

The manuscript must have left the scriptorium of Armagh soon after for England, since it passed into the possession of Æthelstan (r. 924–939), presumably as a diplomatic gift. According to the same inscription, Æthelstan presented the book to Christ Church, Canterbury. The Mac Durnan Gospels offer an insight into the Irish connections of Æthelstan's court, which is known to have been attended by at least one Irish abbot, Dubinsi, abbot of Bangor.

During the 11th century, six Anglo-Saxon charters were copied into the gospel-book, including writs and records of agreements, the latest being no later than AD 1050.

By 1574 it was owned by the Archbishop of Canterbury, Matthew Parker. It was probably Parker who had folios decorated with miniatures taken from a 13th-century Psalter and gave the work its current binding. After his death, Parker bequeathed all his manuscripts, save the Mac Durnan Gospels, to Corpus Christi College, Cambridge. The reason for this is unknown though he may have gifted to a friend while he was alive. The only known owner thereafter is Brother Howel, a manufacturer of measuring instruments in London, who showed the work to antiquarian and poet Lewis Morris. The manuscript probably entered the library of Lambeth Palace on the initiative of its director, Andrew Coltee Ducarel, who assumed the post in 1757. However, the work isn't listed in any library records from the time and doesn't make its first appearance in the catalogues until 1932.

== Contents ==
=== Text ===
The manuscript contains the four Gospels of the Latin Vulgate written in Irish minuscule script and without their usual prologues. The text is very close to that found in the Echternach Gospels, the Book of Armagh, or that of the Gospels of Máel Brigte.
Contents:

- F.5-69: Gospel of Matthew
- f.69-70: Four charters and two texts on the heritage of Canterbury Cathedral dating from before 1050
- f.72-115: Gospel of Mark
- f.117-170: Gospel of Luke
- f.172-216: Gospel of John

=== Decoration ===
The manuscript's introductory page is decorated with a cross that frames the symbols of the Four Evangelists, an angel, an eagle, a bull, and a lion, each surrounded by a yellow or green frame, along with the four portraits of the evangelists, and the initials introducing each gospel. The interior of the cross is decorated with black and white Celtic knot patterns. Along its length are frames decorated with the same knots alternating with red, yellow and green diamonds. The top of the page on the left has been torn and then glued.

The portraits of the evangelists are decorated with the same colors and similar motifs. Matthew holds in his hands a stick and a book in a frame made of interlacing panels and knots (f.4v.). Saint Mark only holds a book and is surrounded by crawling lions symbolizing a throne on which he is seated (f.70v.). Mark's head is surmounted by an animal which exceeds the frame and which looks more like a bull than a lion, thus corresponding to the ancient symbols of the evangelists as seen in the Book of Durrow. Saint Luke, with the geometric head, holds a stick on the ground and a book (f.115v.). Saint John holds in one hand a quill dipped in an inkwell and in the other a book with another quill (f.170v). All the Evangelists are all framed by various motifs of Celtic knots and diamonds, with Saint Luke and Saint John's frames being near-identical. The initials placed at the start of the Gospels have the same register of decoration made of frets and interlacing. Three Gospels are introduced by Evangelist portraits at their opening pages.

Four miniatures taken from a thirteenth-century English Psalter have been placed in the incipit of the Gospels; the Crucifixion at the beginning of Matthew, the Flagellation of Christ at the start of Mark, The Betrayal of Judas at the beginning of Luke, and The Entombment of Christ at the Beginning of John.

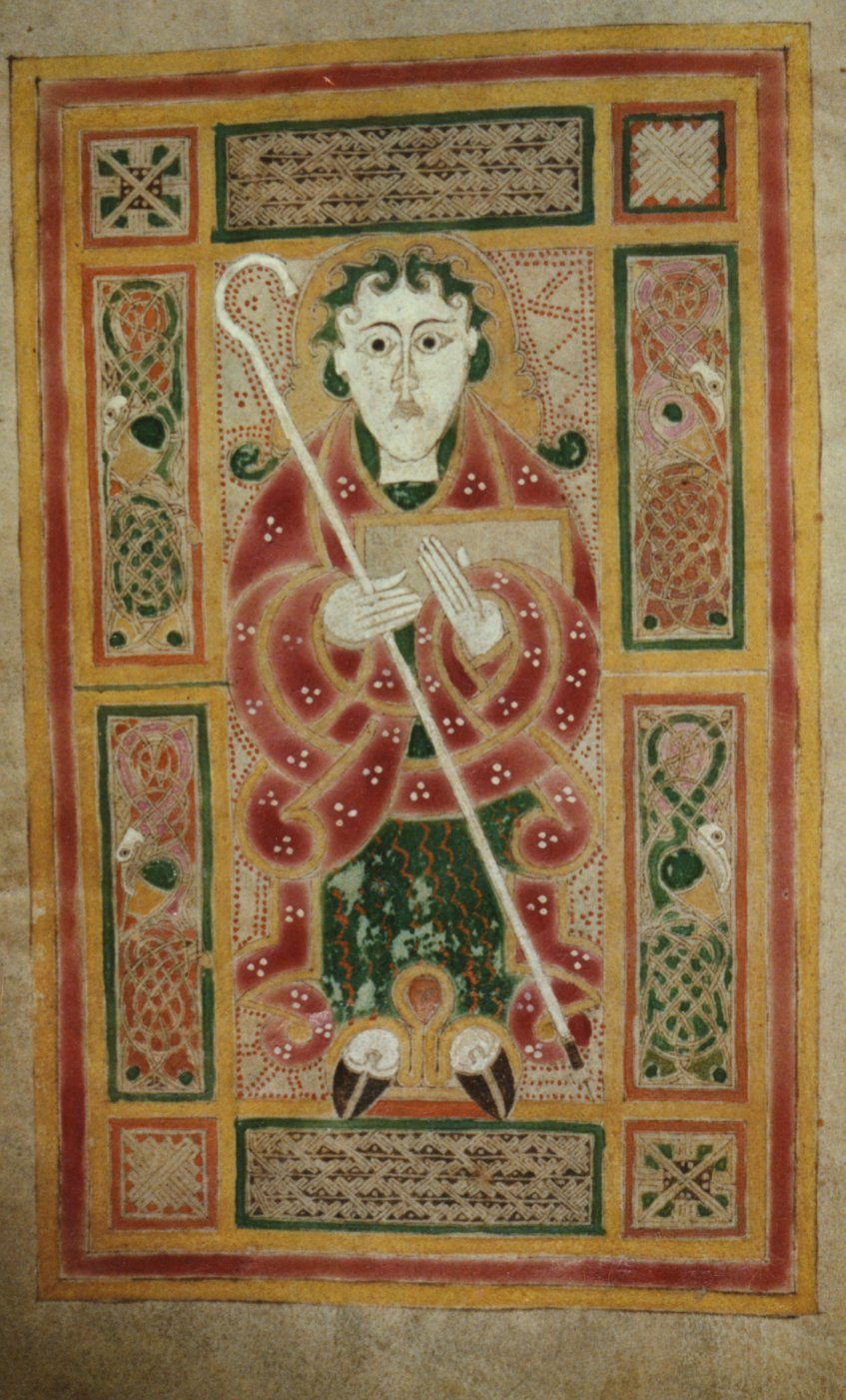
Portrait of Saint Matthew, f.4v.

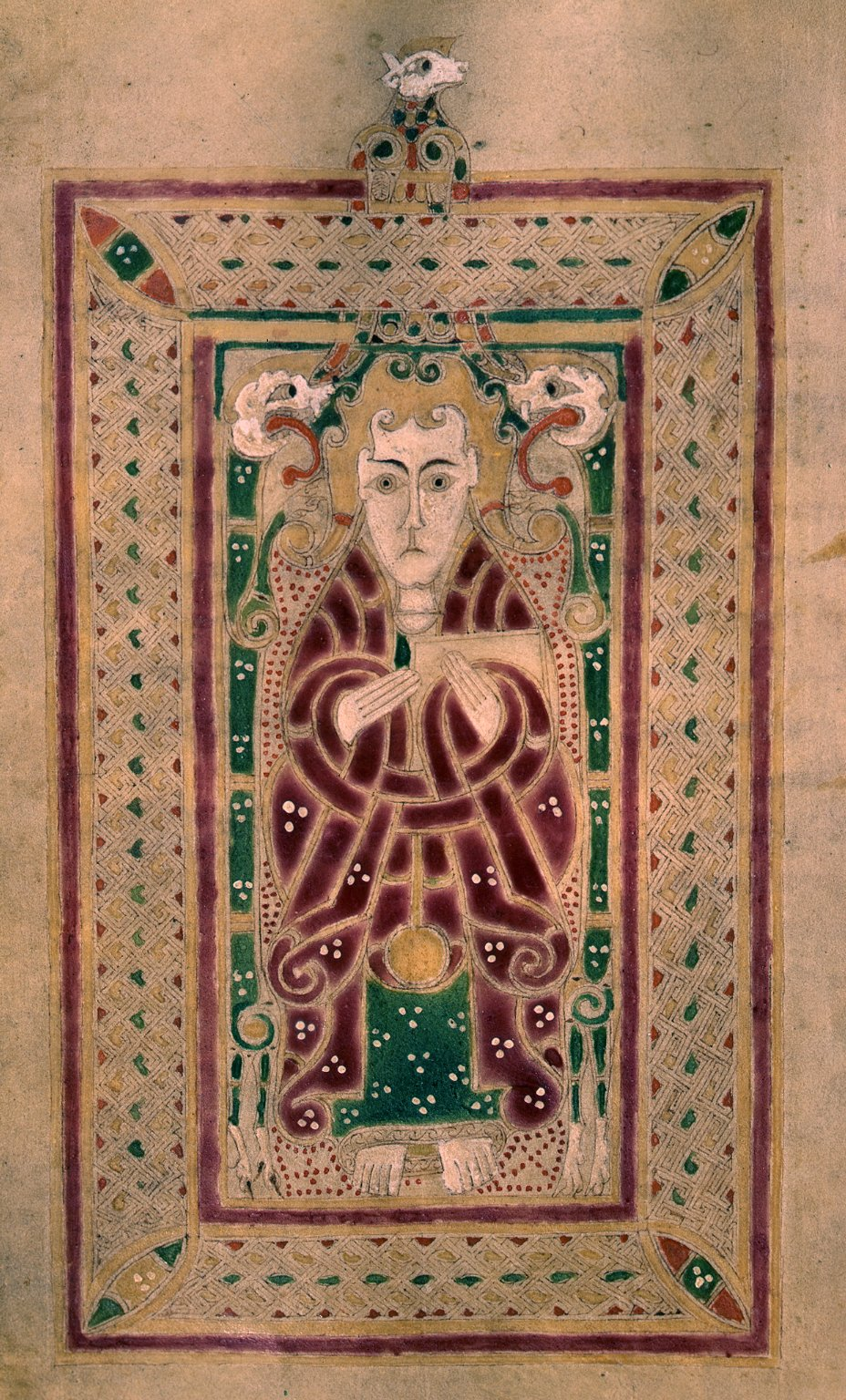
Portrait of Saint Mark, f.70v.

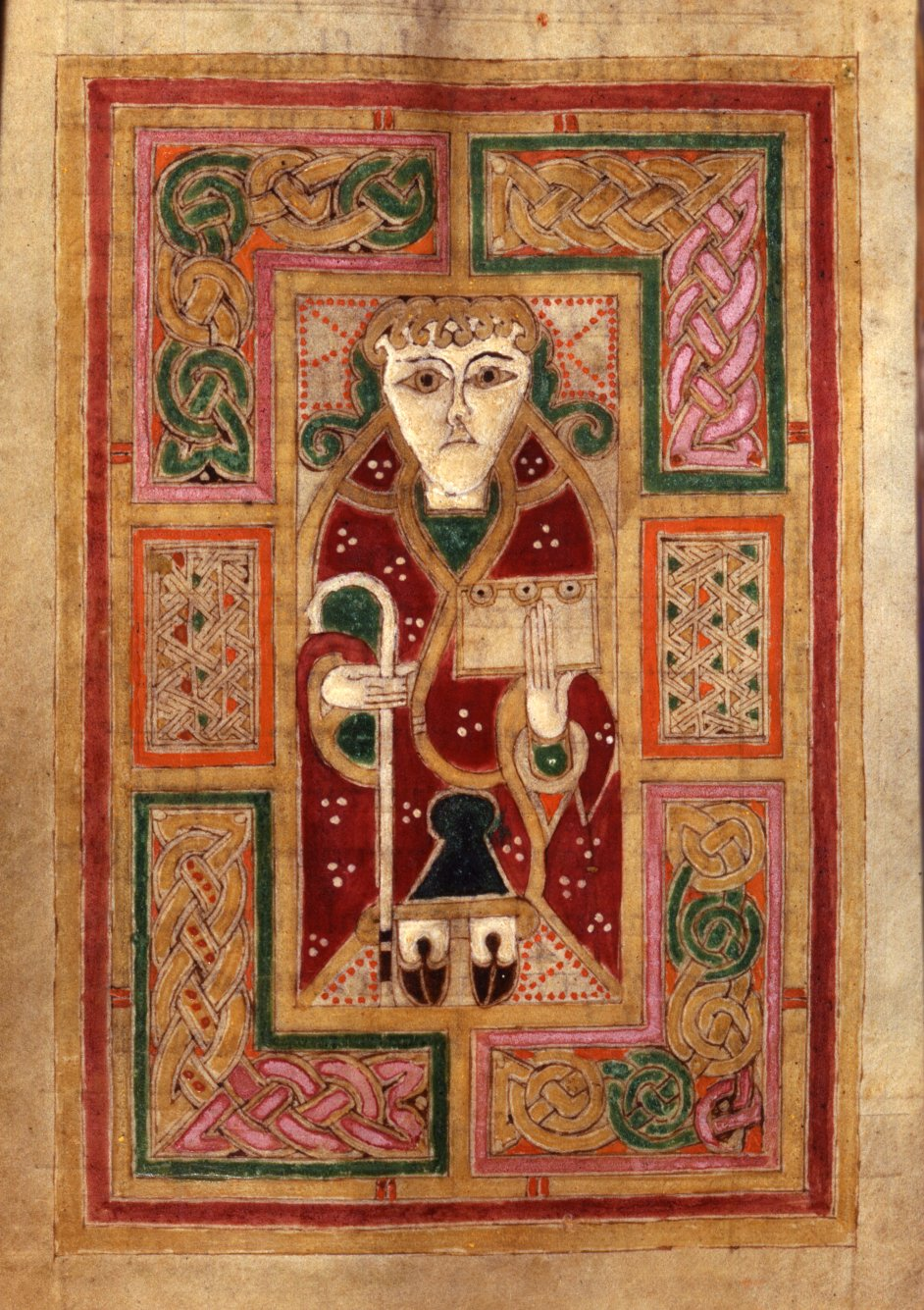
Portrait of Saint Luke, f.115v.

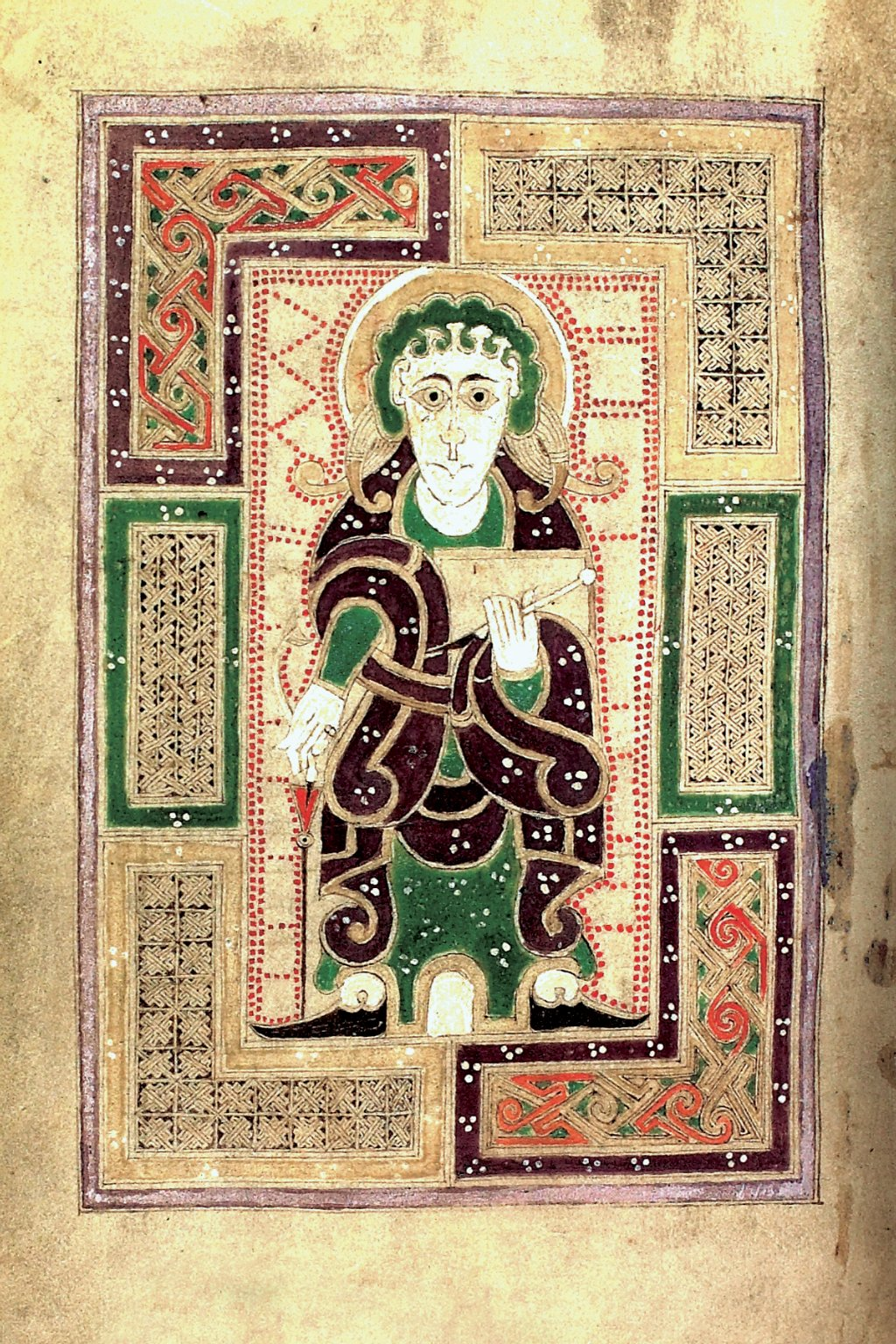
Portrait of Saint John, f.170v.
