= Antiocheis =

Antiocheis is an epic poem by Joseph of Exeter, written in Latin soon after the year 1190, when Joseph returned to England from the Third Crusade on the death of his friend and fellow Crusader, Baldwin of Exeter, archbishop of Canterbury.

The poem is lost, except for a single fragment of 21 lines quoted by William Camden in his miscellany Remains Concerning Britain. The fragment praises Britain as a land of warriors, giving King Arthur as an example.

== Bibliography ==
- Camden, William Remains Concerning Britain (London, 1657) pp. 309–310.
- Mortimer, Richard Angevin England 1154–1258 Oxford: Blackwell 1994 ISBN 0-631-16388-3
