= Heahbeorht =

9th-century Bishop of Worcester

- Bishop of Worcester
- Appointed: 822
- Term ended: between 845 and 848
- Predecessor: Denebeorht
- Successor: Ealhhun

Orders
- Consecration: 822

Personal details
- Died: between 845 and 848
- Denomination: Christian

Heahbeorht or Heahberht was a medieval Bishop of Worcester. He was consecrated in 822. He died between 845 and 848.

== Citations ==
Christian titles
Preceded by Denebeorht	Bishop of Worcester; 822–c. 846	Succeeded by Ealhhun
