= Wilfrith II (bishop of Worcester) =

10th-century Bishop of Worcester

Wilfrith
- Bishop of Worcester
- Appointed: between 915 and 922
- Term ended: 928 or 929
- Predecessor: Æthelhun
- Successor: Koenwald

Orders
- Consecration: between 915 and 922

Personal details
- Died: 928 or 929
- Denomination: Christian

Wilfrith or Wilferth was a medieval Bishop of Worcester. He was consecrated between 915 and 922. He died in 928 or 929. The last charter he attested was dated 16 April 928.

== Citations ==
Christian titles
Preceded by Æthelhun	Bishop of Worcester c. 917–c. 928	Succeeded by Koenwald
