= Robert FitzRalph =

12th-century Bishop of Worcester

- Bishop of Worcester
- Elected: 1 July 1190
- Term ended: 1193
- Predecessor: William of Northall
- Successor: Henry de Sully
- Previous post: Archdeacon of Nottingham

Orders
- Consecration: 5 May 1191

Personal details
- Died: 1193
- Denomination: Catholic

Robert FitzRalph (sometimes known as Robert son of William FitzRalph) was a medieval Bishop of Worcester.

== Life ==
FitzRalph was the son of William FitzRalph, who was a landowner in Derbyshire and was High Sheriff of Nottinghamshire, Derbyshire and the Royal Forests 1170–1180 and was seneschal of Normandy 1178–1200. Robert held a prebend in the diocese of York before he was Archdeacon of Nottingham in 1185. He also held a prebend in the diocese of Lincoln.

FitzRalph was elected to the see of Worcester on 1 July 1190 and consecrated on 5 May 1191. He died in 1193, probably on 27 June but possibly on 14 July.

== Citations ==
Catholic Church titles
Preceded by William of Northall	Bishop of Worcester; 1190–1193	Succeeded by Henry de Sully
