= Máel Brigte mac Tornáin =

Abbot of Armagh and Iona

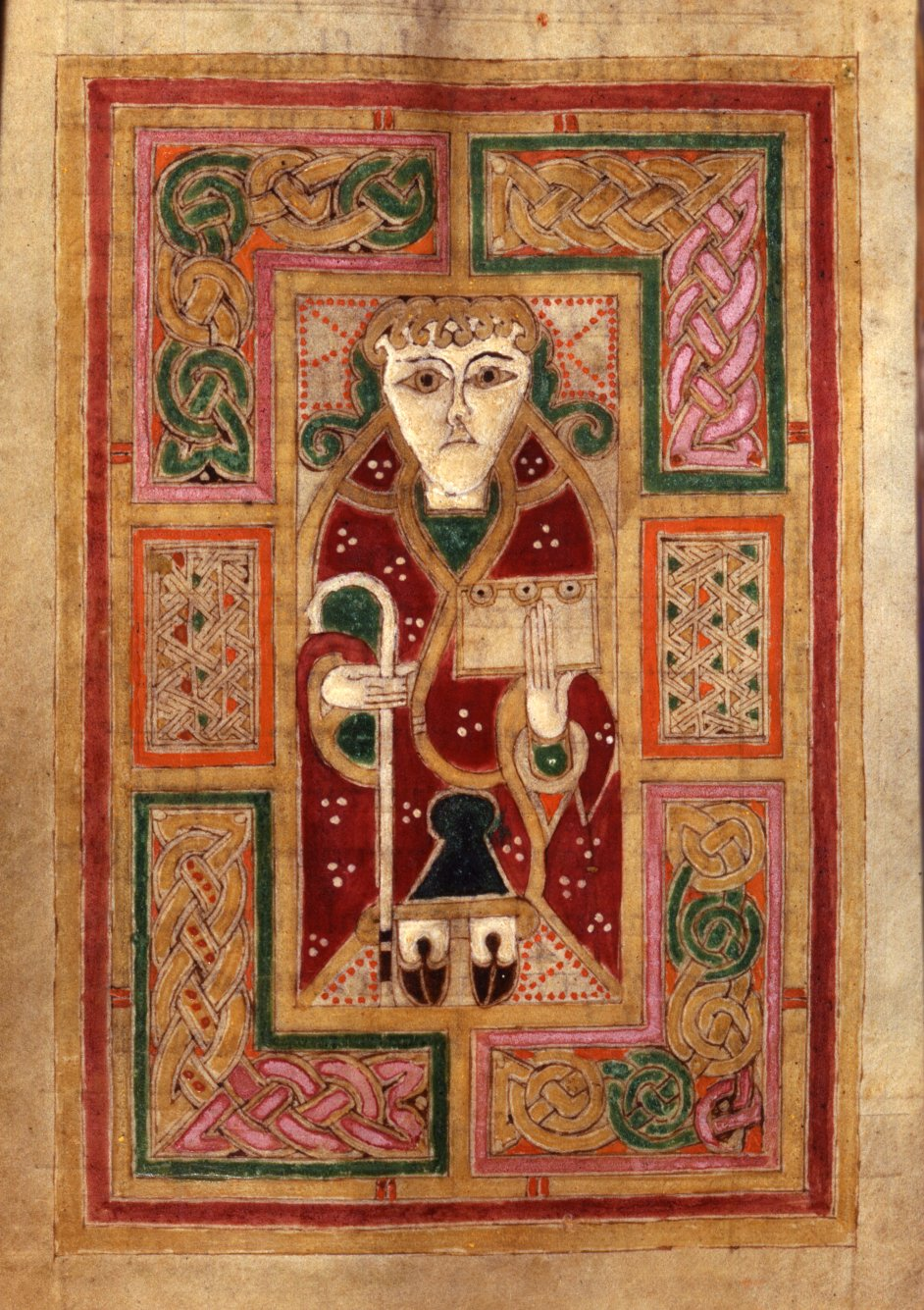
Saint Luke from the Mac Durnan Gospels

Máel Brigte mac Tornáin, also known as Maelbrigte mac Durnan (died 22 February 927), was an Irish clergyman who served as abbot of Armagh from 883 and, in his role as Coarb of Colum Cille, as the Abbot of Iona, non-resident from 891, holding both positions until his death. He is likely responsible for commissioning and may have worked on the Mac Durnan Gospels, an illuminated manuscript now held in the Lambeth Palace Library in London.

== Origins ==
Máel Brigte was a distant member of the royal lineage of Colum Cille of the Uí Néill of Tyrconnell and a member of the Cenél mBógaine a sept of the Cenél Conaill. Two of his cousins were also members of the paruchia of Colum Cille; Dubhthach mac Dubáin († 938), abbot of Raphoe, would succeed him as abbot of Iona and Caencomhrac († 929), abbot and bishop of Derry.

== Abbot of Armagh and Iona ==
Máel Brigte began his career at several monasteries, including Lusk and Devinish, according to the 10th-century text Baile Bricin. He was made Archbishop of Armagh in 883 on the death of Cathassach mac Robartaig. Following the death of Flan mac Máele Duin, he was named "Abbot of Iona in Ireland and Scotland." The appointment of one man to both positions demonstrates the disarray the Irish clergy found themselves in at the turn of the 9th century, faced with the devastating raids by Vikings in the Irish Sea and the resulting impoverishment or even destruction of religious communities. Iona even seems to have been unoccupied at that time.

In 893, Máel Brigte intervened to settle a tribal conflict during Whitsuntide in county Armagh by imposing on one of the parties a tribute of 630 cows and by hanging four Ulstermen. In 913, he traveled south to Munster to pay the ransom of a Breton pilgrim, probably another victim of the Vikings.

== See also ==
- Celtic Christianity
- History of Christianity in Ireland
- Máel Brigte
- Roman Catholic Archdiocese of Armagh

Catholic Church titles
Preceded by Cathassach mac Robartaig	Abbot of Armagh; 883–927	Succeeded by Ioseph mac Fathaig

Catholic Church titles
Preceded by Flan mac Máele Duin	Abbot of Iona; 891–927	Succeeded by Dubhthach mac Dubáin
