= Wulstan Bransford =

14th-century Bishop of Worcester

Wulstan de Bransford
- Bishop of Worcester
- Elected: c. 4 January 1339
- Term ended: 6 August 1349
- Predecessor: Thomas Hemenhale
- Successor: John de Thoresby

Orders
- Consecration: 21 March 1339

Personal details
- Died: 6 August 1349
- Denomination: Catholic

Wulstan Bransford was a medieval Bishop of Worcester.

Bransford was first elected between 31 August and 8 September 1327 but the election was quashed. He was elected again about 4 January 1339 and consecrated on 21 March 1339. He tonsured the poet William de Rokayle, who was known as William Langland.

Bransford died on 6 August 1349.

== Citations ==
Catholic Church titles
Preceded by Thomas Cobham	Bishop of Worcester; Election quashed 1327	Succeeded by Adam Orleton
Preceded by Thomas Hemenhale	Bishop of Worcester; 1339–1349	Succeeded by John de Thoresby
