= Tilhere =

8th-century Bishop of Worcester

- Bishop of Worcester
- Appointed: 777
- Term ended: between 780 and 781
- Predecessor: Waermund
- Successor: Heathured

Orders
- Consecration: 777

Personal details
- Died: between 780 and 781
- Denomination: Christian

Tilhere was a medieval Bishop of Worcester. He was consecrated in 777. He died between 780 and 781.

== Citations ==
Christian titles
Preceded by Waermund	Bishop of Worcester; 777–c. 781	Succeeded by Heathured
