= Joseph of Exeter =

12th-century English poet and writer

Joseph of Exeter was a twelfth-century Latin poet from Exeter, England. Around 1180, he left to study at Gueldres, where he began his lifelong friendship with Guibert, who later became Abbot of Florennes. Some of their correspondence still survives.

His most famous poem is De bello Troiano ("On the Trojan War") in six books, based on Dares Phrygius. Most of it was written before 1183, but it was finished after 1184. When his uncle Baldwin, Archbishop of Canterbury, to whom the De Bello Troiano is dedicated, set off to the Holy Land on the Third Crusade, he persuaded Joseph to accompany him. After Baldwin's death in 1190, Joseph returned home. He immortalized the crusade in his poem Antiocheis, of which only fragments survive. Several other poems, now lost, have been attributed to him, but there is no way of knowing if they were actually his work.
