= Waermund (bishop of Worcester) =

8th-century Bishop of Worcester

- Bishop of Worcester
- Appointed: 775
- Term ended: 777
- Predecessor: Milred
- Successor: Tilhere

Orders
- Consecration: 775

Personal details
- Died: 777
- Denomination: Christian

Waermund (or Wærmund) was a medieval Bishop of Worcester. He was consecrated in 775. He died in 777.

== Citations ==
Christian titles
Preceded by Milred	Bishop of Worcester; 775–777	Succeeded by Tilhere
