= Wilfrith I (bishop of Worcester) =

8th-century Bishop of Worcester

Wilfrith
- Bishop of Worcester
- Appointed: 718
- Term ended: between 743 and 745
- Predecessor: Egwin
- Successor: Milred

Orders
- Consecration: 718

Personal details
- Died: betwseen 743 and 745
- Denomination: Christian

Wilfrith or Wilfrid was a medieval Bishop of Worcester. He was consecrated in 718.

In 735, he consecrated one Eva as the third abbess of Gloucester Abbey. Wilfrith died between 743 and 745, perhaps on 29 April 744.

== Citations ==
Christian titles
Preceded by Egwin	Bishop of Worcester; 718–c. 744	Succeeded by Milred
