= De bello Troiano =

Latin epic poem by Joseph of Exeter

Daretis Phrygii Ilias De bello Troiano
- by Joseph of Exeter
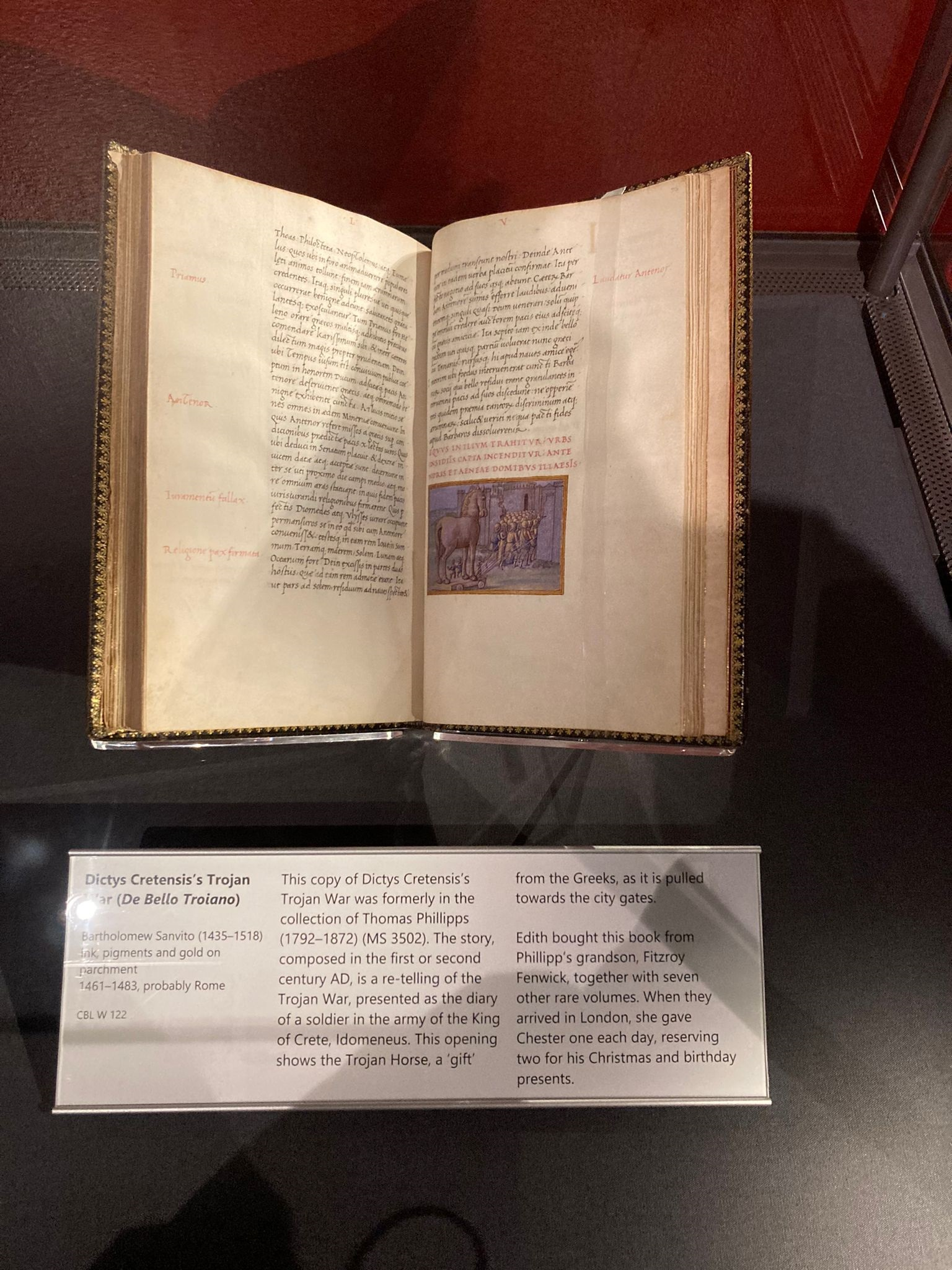
- Manuscript in the Chester Beatty Library by Bartolomeo Sanvito (late 15th century)
- Language: Latin
- Genre: epic poem
- Publication date: 1183

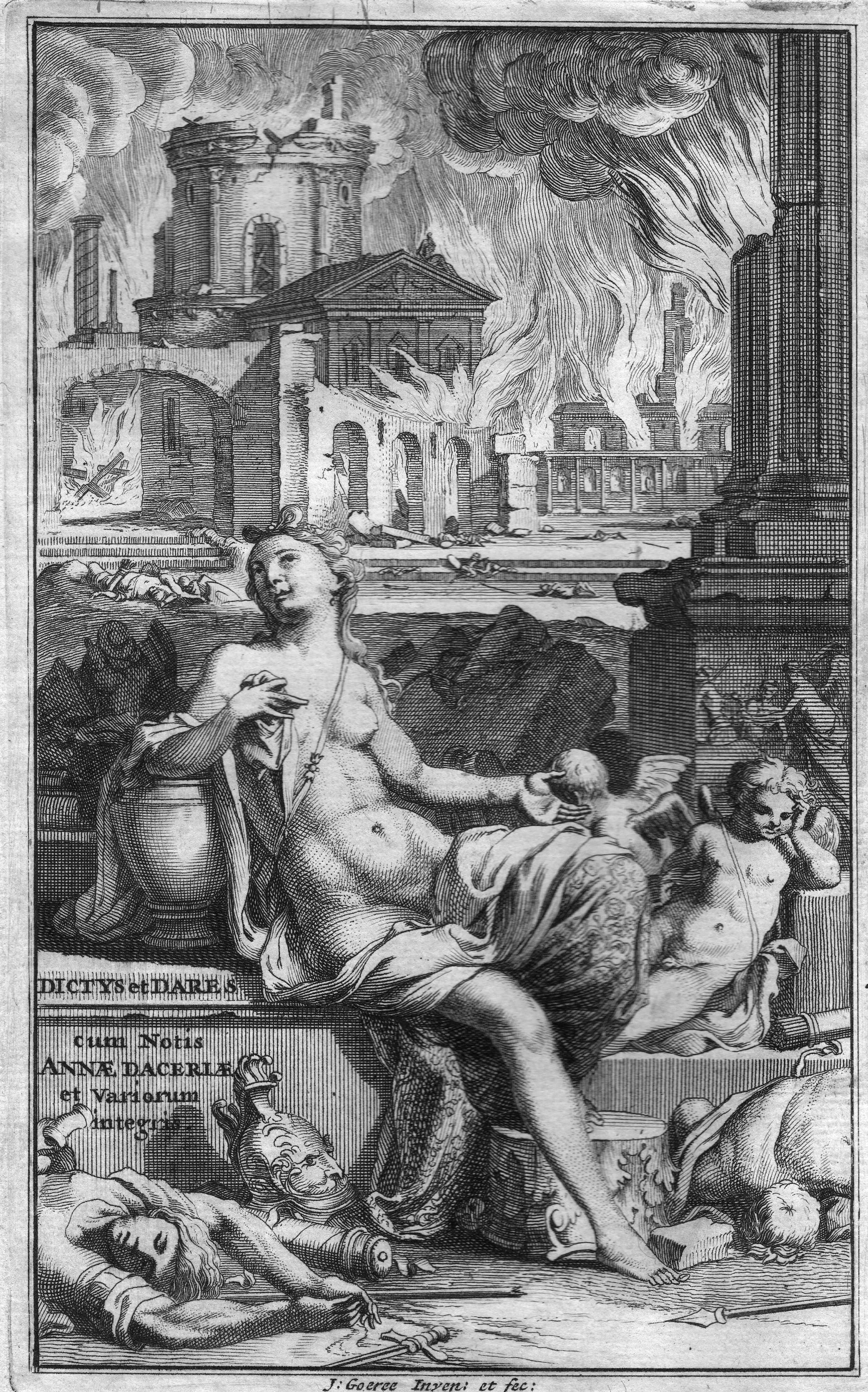
Venus and Cupid observe the destruction of Troy: frontispiece of the 1702 edition of Dictys, Dares and Joseph of Exeter

Daretis Phrygii Ilias De bello Troiano ("The Iliad of Dares the Phrygian: On the Trojan War") is an epic poem in Latin, written around 1183 by the English poet Joseph of Exeter. It tells the story of the ten year Trojan War as it was known in medieval western Europe. The ancient Greek epic on the subject, the Iliad, was inaccessible; instead, the sources available included the fictional "diaries" of Dictys of Crete and Dares of Phrygia. When Joseph's text was printed for the first time in 1541, it was actually erroneously attributed to Dares of Phrygia, announced as the long-lost verse version of his story (quibus multis seculis caruimus – which we lacked for many centuries) supposedly put into Latin hexameters by Nepos.
