= Bosel =

7th-century Bishop of Worcester

- Bishop of Worcester
- Appointed: 680
- Term ended: 691
- Predecessor: new foundation
- Successor: Oftfor

Orders
- Consecration: 680

Personal details
- Died: after 691
- Denomination: Christian

Bosel was a medieval Bishop of Worcester.

Bosel was consecrated bishop in 680. Around 681, he consecrated Kyneburg, a relative of Osric of Hwicce, as the first abbess of Gloucester Abbey, which had been founded by Osric.

Around 685, Bosel founded the Royal Grammar School Worcester, which is the fifth oldest school in the United Kingdom. He was also the head of Worcester Cathedral when it was founded.

Bosel resigned the see in 691 and died sometime after that date.

== Citations ==
Christian titles
| New creation | Bishop of Worcester; 680–691 | Succeeded by Oftfor |
