= Bishop of Worcester =

Diocesan bishop in the Church of England

- Bishopric

anglican
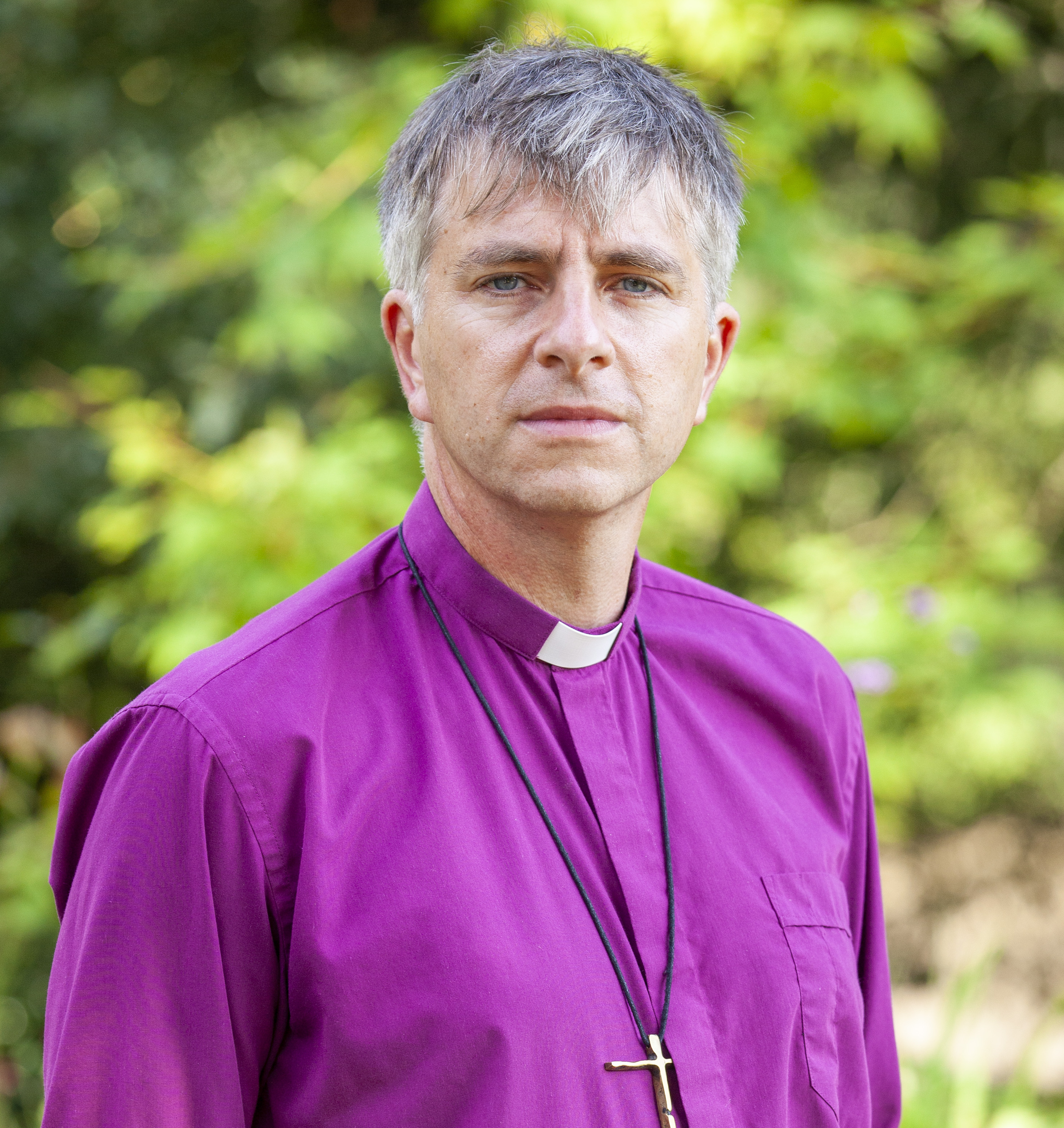

- Arms of the Bishop of Worcester: Argent, ten torteaux gules, four, three, two and one
- Incumbent: Hugh Nelson since 17 January 2026

Location
- Ecclesiastical province: Canterbury
- Residence: The Old Palace, Worcester

Information
- First holder: Bosel
- Established: 680
- Diocese: Worcester
- Cathedral: Worcester Cathedral

The Bishop of Worcester is the head of the Church of England Diocese of Worcester in the Province of Canterbury, England. The title can be traced back to the foundation of the diocese in the year 680. From then until the 16th century, the bishops were in full communion with the Catholic Church. During the Reformation, the church in England broke away from the authority of the Pope and the Catholic Church, at first temporarily and later more permanently. Since the Reformation, the Bishop and Diocese of Worcester has been part of the Church of England and the Anglican Communion.

The diocese covers most of the county of Worcestershire, including the Metropolitan Borough of Dudley and parts of the City of Wolverhampton. The Episcopal see is in the city of Worcester where the bishop's throne is located at the Cathedral Church of Christ and the Blessed Virgin Mary. The bishop's official residence is the Old Palace, Worcester. The bishops had two residences outside the city: Hartlebury Castle near Kidderminster from the 13th century to 2007 and a palace at Alvechurch until it was pulled down in the 17th century.

From the elevations of Oswald of Worcester in 961 at Worcester and 972 at York, until 1023 the see was usually held jointly with the (then rather poorer) Archbishopric of York.

On 29th July 2025, it was announced that Hugh Nelson, the current Bishop suffragan of St Germans in the Diocese of Truro — and Bishop to the Forces —, would be the next Bishop of Worcester. His installation service took place in January 2026.

== List of bishops ==
=== Pre-Conquest ===
Bishops of Worcester
From	Until	Incumbent	Notes
680	691	Bosel	Resigned the See
691	693	Oftfor	
693	717	Ecgwine of Evesham	Also recorded as Ecgwin, Egwin and Eegwine
718	c.744	Wilfrith (I.)	Also recorded as Wilfrid
c.743	c.775	Milred	Also recorded as Mildred and Hildred
775	777	Waermund	Also recorded as Wærmund
777	c.780/81	Tilhere	
781	c.799	Heathured	Also recorded as Hathored, AEthelred and Æthelred
c.799	822	Denebeorht	Also recorded as Deneberht
822	c.845/48	Heahbeorht	Also recorded as Heahberht and Eadbert
c.845/48	872	Ealhhun	Also recorded as Alwin
873	915	Werferth	Also recorded as Waerfrith, Wærferth, Werfrith and Waerfrith
915	922	Æthelhun	
922	929	Wilfrith (II.)	
fl.929	957	Koenwald	Also recorded as Cenwald and Coenwald
957	959	Dunstan	Previously Abbot of Glastonbury; translated to London; and later to Canterbury
961	992	Oswald	Held both Worcester and York ( 971–992)
992	1002	Ealdwulf	Previously Abbot of Peterborough; held both Worcester and York (995–1002)
1002	1016	Wulfstan (I.)	Translated from London; also Archbishop of York (1002–1023)
1016	1033	Leofsige	
1033	1038	Beorhtheah	
c. 1038/39	1040	Lyfing (1st term)	Deprived from Worcester; also Bishop of Crediton and Cornwall (1027–1046)
1040	1041	Ælfric Puttoc	Also Archbishop of York, 1023–1041; deprived from both
1041	1046	Lyfing (2nd term)	Restored to Worcester
1046	1061	Ealdred	Translated from Hereford; later to York
1062	1095	Wulfstan (II.)	Canonized on 14 May 1203 by Pope Innocent III

=== Conquest to Reformation ===
Bishops of Worcester
From	Until	Incumbent	Notes
1096	1112	Samson	
1113	1123	Theulf	Nominated in 1113; consecrated in 1115
1125	1150	Simon	
1151	1157	John de Pageham	
1158	1160	Alured	
1163	1179	Roger	Also recorded as Roger of Gloucester
1180	1185	Baldwin	Translated to Canterbury
1185	1190	William of Northall	
1191	1193	Robert FitzRalph	Previously Archdeacon of Nottingham
1193	1195	Henry de Sully	Previously Abbot of Glastonbury Abbey
1196	1198	John of Coutances	
1199	1212	Mauger	Elected in 1199, but quashed by Pope Innocent III; later postulated to the See; consecrated in 1200
1213	1214	Randulf of Evesham (bishop-elect)	Elected in December 1213, but quashed by the Papal legate, Niccolò de Romanis, in January 1214
1214	1216	Walter de Gray	Translated to York
1216	1218	Sylvester	Also recorded as Sylvester of Evesham
1218	1236	William de Blois	
1237	1266	Walter de Cantilupe	
1266	1268	Nicholas of Ely	Formerly Archdeacon of Ely;translated to Winchester
1268	1302	Godfrey Giffard	
1302		John St German (bishop-elect)	Elected in March 1302, but quashed in October 1302
1302	1307	William Gainsborough	
1307	1313	Walter Reynolds	Translated to Canterbury
1313	1317	Walter Maidstone	
1317	1327	Thomas Cobham	Previously Archbishop-elect of Canterbury in 1313
1327		Wulstan Bransford (bishop-elect)	Elected bishop but was quashed; later elected in 1339
1327	1333	Adam Orleton	Translated from Hereford; later to Winchester
1333	1337	Simon Montacute	Translated to Ely
1337	1338	Thomas Hemenhale	Translated from Norwich
1339	1349	Wulstan Bransford	
1349	1353	John of Thoresby	Translated from St David's; later to York
1352	1361	Reginald Brian	Translated from St David's
1362	1363	John Barnet	Translated to Bath and Wells; and later to Ely
1363	1368	William Whittlesey	Translated from Rochester; later to Canterbury
1368	1373	William Lenn	Translated from Chichester
1373	1375	Walter Lyghe (bishop-elect)	Elected in 1373, but quashed in 1375
1375	1395	Henry Wakefield	
1394	1401	Robert Tideman of Winchcombe	Translated from Llandaff
1401	1407	Richard Clifford	Previously Bishop-elect of Bath and Wells; later translated to London
1407	1419	Thomas Peverel	Translated from Llandaff
1419	1426	Philip Morgan	Translated to Ely
1425	1433	Thomas Poulton	Translated from Chichester
1433	1435	Thomas Brunce (bishop-elect)	Elected bishop, but never consecrated; later became Bishop of Rochester
1434	1443	Thomas Bourchier	Translated to Ely; and later to Canterbury
1443	1476	John Carpenter	Nominated in 1443; consecrated in 1444; resigned the See in 1476; apparently used the style "Bishop of Worcester and Westbury"
1476	1486	John Alcock	Translated from Rochester; later to Ely
1486	1497	Robert Morton	Nominated in 1486; consecrated in 1487
1497	1498	Giovanni de' Gigli	
1498	1521	Silvestro de' Gigli	
1521	1522	Giulio di Giuliano de' Medici	Appointed apostolic administrator of the See of Worcester in 1521 and resigned in 1522; also Archbishop of Florence and Narbonne and Bishop of Eger; he was elected as Pope Clement VII in 1523.
1522	1535	Girolamo Ghinucci	Deprived of the See by Henry VIII when the king broke with Rome; later in 1535 Ghinucci was created a cardinal.

=== During the Reformation ===
Bishops of Worcester
From	Until	Incumbent	Notes
1535	1539	Hugh Latimer	Resigned the See
1539	1543	John Bell	
1543	1551	Nicholas Heath (1st term)	Translated from Rochester; deprived of the See
1552	1554	John Hooper	Translated from Gloucester, 20 May 1552 when Gloucester was reunited to Worcester; called "Bishop of Worcester and Gloucester" and "of Gloucester and Worcester"; deprived of the See.
1554	1555	Nicholas Heath (2nd term)	Restored to the See; later translated to York
1555	1559	Richard Pate	Deprived of the See.

=== Post-Reformation ===
Bishops of Worcester
From	Until	Incumbent	Notes
1559	1570	Edwin Sandys	Translated to London; and later to York
1570 (designate)		James Calfhill	Archdeacon of Colchester (1565–1570). Allegedly nominated by Queen Elizabeth I, but died before election.
1571	1576	Nicholas Bullingham	Translated from Lincoln
1577	1583	John Whitgift	Translated to Canterbury
1584	1591	Edmund Freke	Translated from Norwich
1593	1595	Richard Fletcher	Translated from Bristol; later to London
1596	1597	Thomas Bilson	Translated to Winchester
1597	1610	Gervase Babington	Translated from Exeter
1610	1616	Henry Parry	Translated from Gloucester
1617	1641	John Thornborough	Translated from Bristol
1641	1646	John Prideaux	Deprived of the see when the English episcopacy was abolished by Parliament on 9 October 1646.
1646	1660	The see was abolished during the Commonwealth and the Protectorate.	
1660	1662	George Morley	Translated to Winchester
1662		John Gauden	Translated from Exeter
1662	1663	John Earle	Translated to Salisbury
1663	1670	Robert Skinner	Translated from Bristol
1671	1675	Walter Blandford	Translated from Oxford
1675	1683	James Fleetwood	
1683	1689	William Thomas	Translated from St David's
1689	1699	Edward Stillingfleet	
1699	1717	William Lloyd	Translated from Lichfield and Coventry
1717	1743	John Hough	Translated from Lichfield and Coventry
1743	1759	Isaac Maddox	Translated from St Asaph
1759	1774	James Johnson	Translated from Gloucester
1774	1781	Brownlow North	Translated from Lichfield and Coventry; later to Winchester
1781	1808	Richard Hurd	Translated from Lichfield and Coventry
1808	1831	Folliott Cornewall	Translated from Hereford
1831	1841	Robert Carr	Translated from Chichester
1841	1860	Henry Pepys	Translated from Sodor and Man
1861	1890	Henry Philpott	
1890	1901	John Perowne	Resigned
1902	1905	Charles Gore	Translated to Birmingham; and later to Oxford
1905	1918	Huyshe Yeatman-Biggs	Translated from Southwark; later to Coventry
1919	1931	Ernest Pearce	
1931	1941	Arthur Perowne	Translated from Bradford
1941	1955	William Wilson Cash	
1956	1971	Mervyn Charles-Edwards	
1971	1981	Robin Woods	
1982	1996	Philip Goodrich	Previously Bishop of Tonbridge (1973–1982)
1997	2007	Peter Selby	Previously Bishop of Kingston-upon-Thames (1984–1992). Also Bishop to HM Prisons (2001–2007)
2007 (acting)		David Walker	Bishop of Dudley. Episcopal commissary (acting diocesan bishop) during interregnum.
2007	2024	John Inge	Retired 9 October 2024.
2024–2026	acting	Martin Gorick, Bishop of Dudley	Acting diocesan bishop during vacancy in See, from 9 October 2024.
2026	present	Hugh Nelson	Also Bishop to the Forces; previously Bishop of St Germans

== Assistant bishops ==
Among those who have served as assistant bishops of the diocese are:

- 1936 – 1944 (d.): Ridley Duppuy, Canon Residentiary of Worcester Cathedral, Archdeacon of Worcester (from 1938), Vice-Dean of Worcester (from 1940) and former Bishop of Victoria
- 1946 – January 1953 (ret.): Bertram Lasbrey, Rector of St Andrew's &c. Worcester and former Bishop on the Niger
- 1953 – 1965 (ret.): Cyril Stuart, Rector of St Andrew's &c. Worcester (until 1965), Canon of Worcester thereafter, and former Bishop of Uganda
- 1968 – 1991 (ret.): Nicholas Allenby, former Bishop of Kuching
- 1989 – 2008 (d.): Kenneth Woollcombe, assistant priest in Upton Snodsbury (1989–?), former Bishop of Oxford and Assistant Bishop of London for Westminster
