= Henry Wakefield (bishop of Worcester) =

14th-century Bishop of Worcester and Treasurer of England

- Bishop of Worcester
- Elected: 12 September 1375
- Term ended: 11 March 1395
- Predecessor: Walter Lyghe
- Successor: Robert Tideman of Winchcombe

Orders
- Consecration: 28 October 1375

Personal details
- Died: 11 March 1395
- Denomination: Roman Catholic

Henry Wakefield was a medieval Bishop of Worcester.

Wakefield was elected on 12 September 1375 and consecrated on 28 October 1375.

Wakefield briefly served as Lord High Treasurer in 1377.

Wakefield died on 11 March 1395.

== Citations ==
Political offices
Preceded by Robert de Ashton	Lord High Treasurer; 1377	Succeeded by Thomas Brantingham
Catholic Church titles
Preceded by Walter Lyghe	Bishop of Worcester; 1375–1395	Succeeded by Robert Tideman of Winchcombe
