= Cynesige =

Archbishop of York from 1051 to 1060

- Archbishop of York
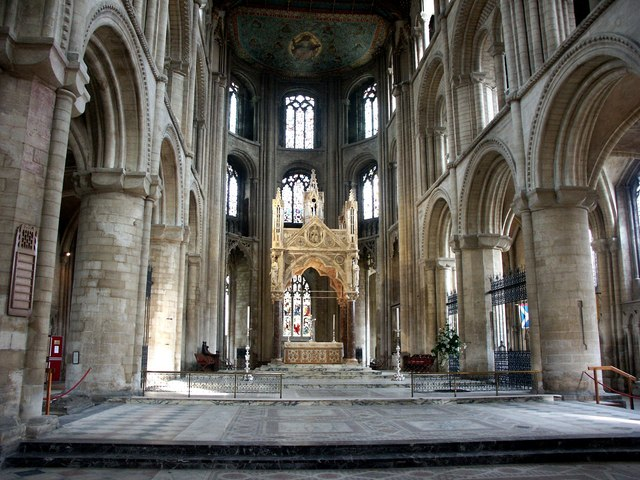
- Interior of Peterborough Cathedral. Cynesige was buried here when it was an abbey.
- Appointed: 1051
- Term ended: 22 December 1060
- Predecessor: Ælfric Puttoc
- Successor: Ealdred

Orders
- Consecration: 1051

Personal details
- Died: 22 December 1060
- Buried: Peterborough Cathedral

Cynesige (Note: Also Cynsige, Kynsige or Kinsius) (died 22 December 1060) was a medieval English Archbishop of York between 1051 and 1060. Prior to his appointment to York, he was a royal clerk and perhaps a monk at Peterborough. As archbishop, he built and adorned his cathedral as well as other churches, and was active in consecrating bishops. After his death in 1060, the bequests he had made to a monastery were confiscated by the queen.

== Life ==
Cynesige perhaps came from Rutland, as he owned the manor of Tinwell there later in life. The Liber Eliensis claimed that he had been born by Caesarian section, but this is most likely a later accretion to his life story, added after his death because of efforts to have him declared a saint. The belief was that for an infant to survive a caesarian section was a miracle, and thus a fitting beginning for a future saint.

Cynesige had been a royal clerk prior to his appointment to York in 1051, although the monks of Peterborough Abbey maintained that he had been a monk in their house. It is possible he was both a monk and a royal clerk. He delayed his visit to Rome to receive his pallium until 1055, when he was given it by Pope Victor II. (Note: Veronica Ortenberg in her chapter "The Anglo-Saxon Church and Papacy" in The English Church & the Papacy in the Middle Ages states that he received his pallium in 1033, but this is an obvious error.) During his time as archbishop he was claimed to have consecrated both John and Magsuen as Bishops of Glasgow, although the two bishops probably never lived in their diocese. John may have ended up as the Bishop of Mecklenburg in Germany. Cynesige dedicated the church of the Abbey of Waltham Holy Cross in the presence of King Edward the Confessor around 3 May 1060. This was at the invitation of Earl Harold Godwinson of Wessex. The chronicle of Waltham Abbey states that Cynesige did the consecration because the archbishopric of Canterbury was vacant. However, there was an occupant of Canterbury, Stigand, but his election to Canterbury was not considered canonical by the papacy, and Harold may have excluded him because of concerns about Stigand's canonical status.

Cynesige expanded and embellished York Minster and other churches in his archdiocese, and built the tower at Beverley, as well as giving books and other items to the church there. He consecrated Herewald as Bishop of Llandaff at a council held at London in 1056, although this information is only attested in the Book of Llandaff, a sometimes unreliable source. In 1059 he, along with Earl Tostig and Æthelwine Bishop of Durham, escorted King Malcolm III of Scotland to King Edward's court at Gloucester when Malcolm came south, probably to thank Edward for his help in restoring Malcolm to the Scottish throne, and perhaps to acknowledge the English king as Malcolm's lord.

Cynesige died on 22 December 1060 and was buried at Peterborough, in what is now Peterborough Cathedral. After his death, he was honoured as a saint by the monks at Peterborough, although the cult does not seem to have spread far. His bones, along with those of his predecessor Ælfric Puttoc, were found in 1643. His reputation for sanctity and poverty was based on his actions, as he often traveled on foot, and spent much time preaching and giving alms. The Northumbrian Priests' Law which is usually attributed to Wulfstan II, Archbishop of York, might have been authored instead by Cynesige, or possibly Cynesige's predecessor Ælfric Puttoc. He gave gifts to Peterborough in his will, but the gifts were taken by Queen Edith instead.

== Citations ==
Christian titles
Preceded by Ælfric Puttoc	Archbishop of York; 1051–1060	Succeeded by Ealdred
