= Amberley Castle =

Grade I listed castle in Chichester District, United Kingdom

Coordinates: 50.90914°N 0.54064°W

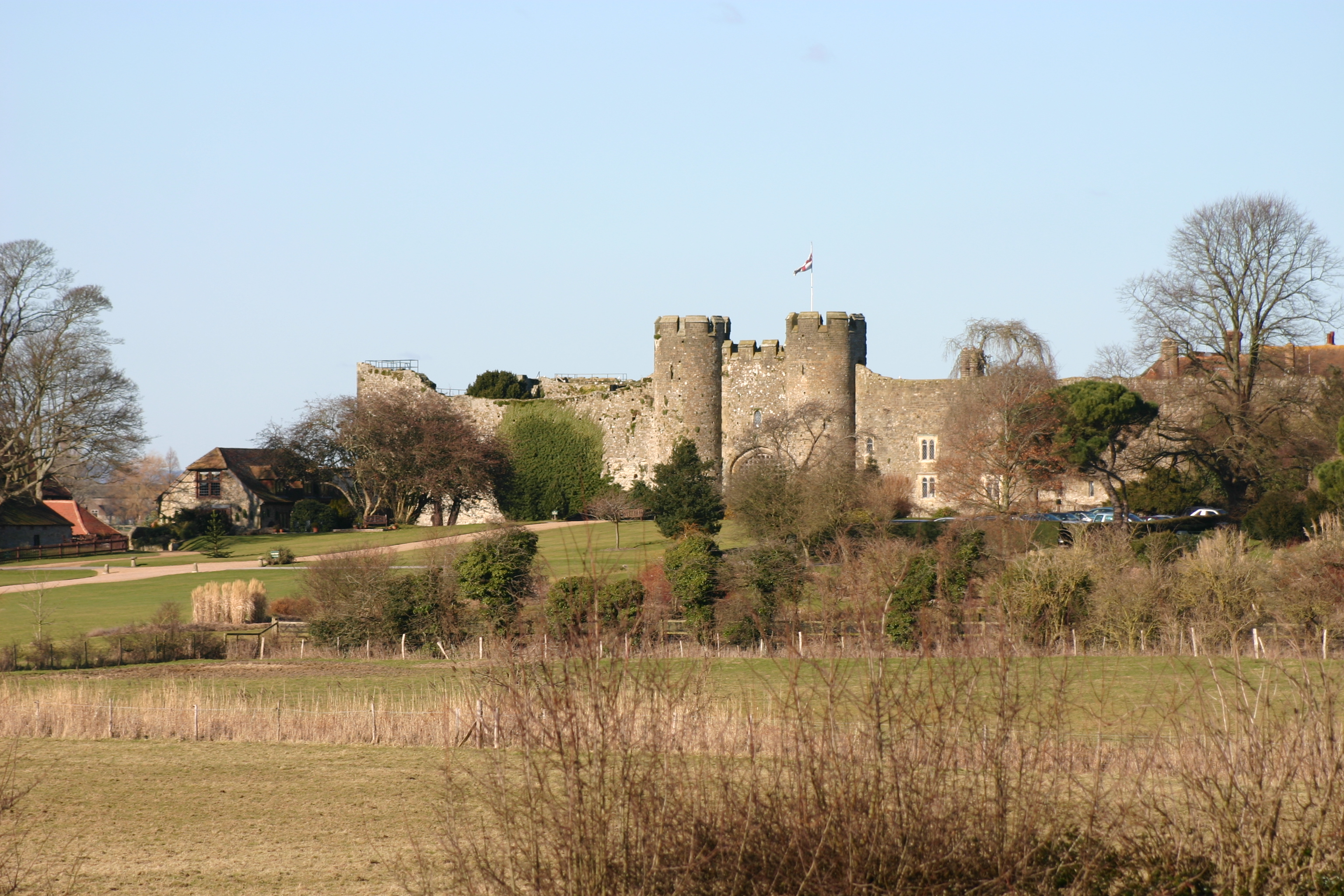
Amberley Castle

Amberley Castle stands in the village of Amberley, West Sussex (grid reference TQ027132).

The castle was erected as a 12th-century manor house and fortified in 1377, giving it a rhomboid shaped stonework enclosure with high curtain walls, internal towers in each corner, a hall and a gateway. It was used as a fortress by the bishops of Chichester. The walls, gateway and two of the towers remain as a Grade I listed building and are now in use as a privately owned hotel.

== History ==
The site on which the castle stands was endowed to the See of Selsey by Cædwalla of Wessex in AD 683. When the bishopric was removed to Chichester, after the Norman conquest, it continued to be held by the Bishops of Chichester. The first recorded structure was a timber-framed lodge built by Bishop Ralph de Luffa in 1103. This was knocked down in 1140 by Bishop Seffrid I and replaced by a more elaborate stone hall, to which Bishop Seffrid II added the East Wing in 1200. A larger Great Hall was added by Bishop John Langton between 1305 and 1337, when the site became known as the Bishop of Chichester's Summer Palace.

Bishop William Reade had the Great Hall knocked down and replaced by a better one. In 1377, at the beginning of the Hundred Years War, there was a concern that the south coast of England would be raided by the French, so the bishop applied for, and received, permission to fortify the site and add the gatehouse and oubliette. Walls up to 40 feet high were built round the whole site. Bishop Robert Sherborne, who died in 1536, was the last Bishop of Chichester to occupy the castle, after which it was leased by a number of tenants.

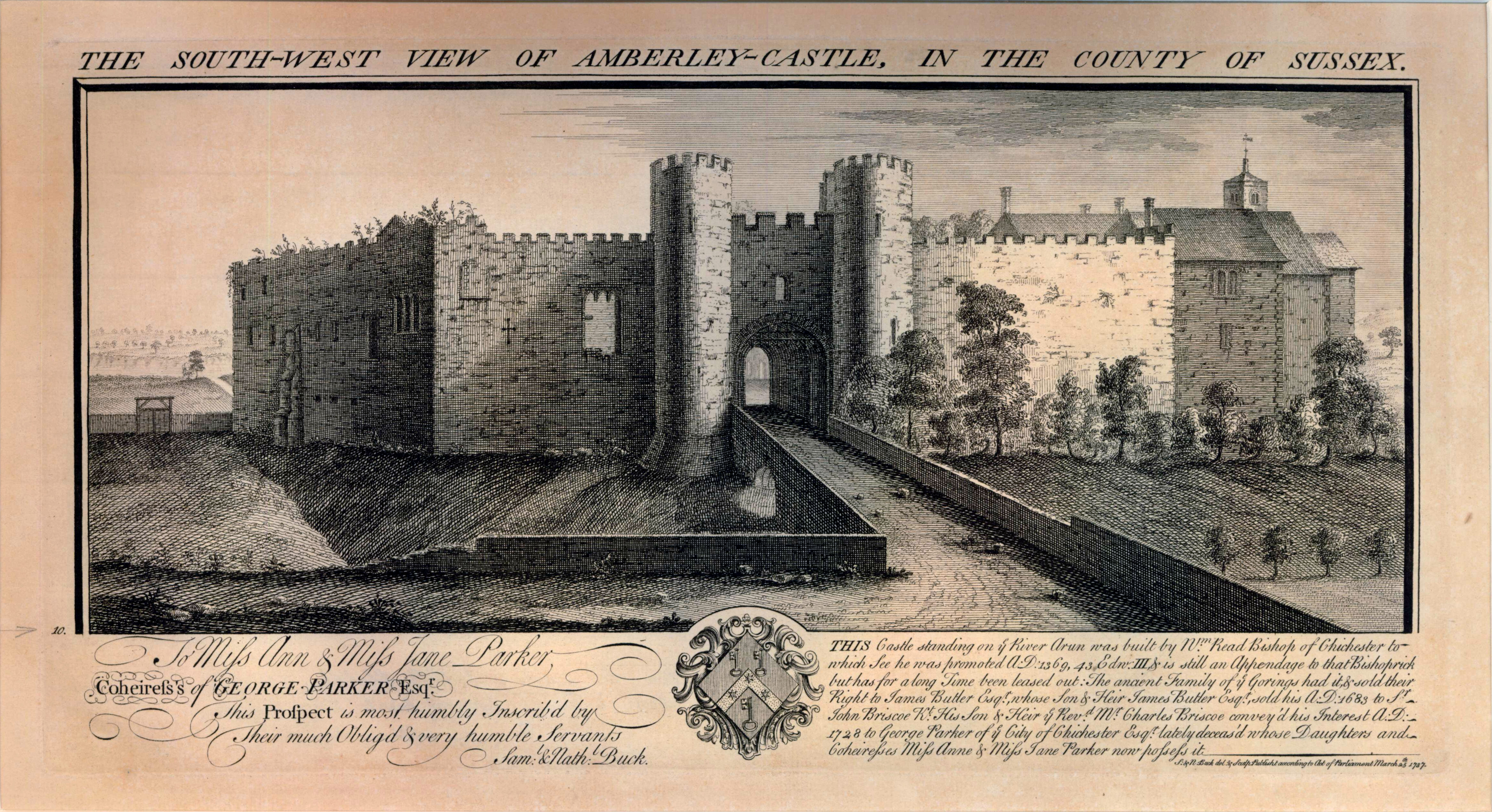
An 18th-century engraving of the castle by Samuel and Nathaniel Buck

In the English Civil War the Royalist tenant caused Oliver Cromwell to order General William Waller to attack the castle, which resulted in the loss of 20 feet from the height of the walls and the destruction of the Great Hall. The castle was sold to a Mr Butler but restored to the Bishop of Chichester after the Restoration of the Monarchy in 1660. The Butlers remained as tenants, followed by the Briscoes.

In 1872, the Castle was sold to Robert Curzon, 15th Lord Zouche, who used it as a hunting lodge before selling it to Henry Fitzalan-Howard, 15th Duke of Norfolk in 1893. Known as ‘The Builder Duke’, the 15th Duke renovated the castle, as well as modernising Arundel Castle and building Arundel Cathedral. In 1926, the castle passed to the Emmet family, in 1982 to Hollis Baker, in 1987 to an American family and in 1988 to Joy and Martin Cummings, who converted it to an award-winning country house hotel. From 2004 to present, the castle is a member of Relais & Châteaux.

Much modified, the castle is now owned by Andrew and Christina Brownsword and operated as a hotel in the Brownsword Hotel group.

== See also ==
- Castles in Great Britain and Ireland
- List of castles in England
