= English embassy to Rome (1061) =

The English embassy to Rome in 1061 was a deputation sent by king Edward the Confessor to the pope, Nicholas II, to deal with various ecclesiastical matters, particularly the ordination of Giso, Bishop of Wells, Walter, Bishop of Hereford, and Ealdred, Archbishop of York. They travelled to Rome under the protection of Tostig, earl of Northumbria and his brother Gyrth. Ealdred was initially refused ordination by the pope because he was adjudged guilty of pluralism and other breaches of canon law, and the embassy received a further setback when they were despoiled by robbers as they began their journey home. When they returned indignantly to Rome, however, Ealdred was granted the archbishopric after all, and the party was able to make its way home to England with almost all its objectives achieved.

== Background ==
Stigand, Archbishop of Canterbury, had been appointed in 1052 by Edward the Confessor, in line with the practice of the Anglo-Saxon Church but contrary to the doctrine of the reforming party in Rome for whom all appointments to archbishoprics needed to be confirmed by the Pope. He had been sent the pallium, the vestment of his office, by Benedict X in 1058, but this pope had been deposed by the reformers and all his acts nullified. Consequently Stigand's legitimacy as archbishop was more than doubtful. At the Christmas assembly in 1060 Ealdred, Bishop of Worcester, was raised to the archbishopric of York without abandoning his position in Worcester, and at about the same time Edward chose two of his clerks, Giso and Walter, both Lotharingians, to the bishoprics of Wells and Hereford respectively. Giso and Walter could not be ordained by Ealdred, who had not yet received his own pallium, nor by Stigand in view of his compromised legitimacy, so Edward decided to send all three of the new appointees to Rome to be invested. Further issues could also be judged there, including a proposed transfer of Lindsey from the bishopric of Dorchester to that of York and perhaps the granting of papal privileges to Westminster Abbey. They were probably also to take to Rome the financial tribute known as Peter's Pence.

== Journey to Rome ==
Early in 1061 the embassy set out. Along with the three bishops went Tostig Godwinson, earl of Northumbria, his wife, Judith of Flanders, and his brother, earl Gyrth. Also a Northumbrian nobleman called Gospatric (possible identical with that Gospatric who later gained the earldom of Northumbria), and a young son of the Mercian earl Ælfgar called Burgheard, both of whom were probably hostages taken to ensure good behaviour during Tostig's absence from Northumbria. The author of the Vita Ædwardi Regis, one of the main historical sources for the story of this embassy, may also have been part of it, and so certainly was a large military escort formed of Edward's housecarls.

The route they chose, taking them through Saxony, the upper Rhineland, Burgundy, the Alps and Lombardy, suggests the possibility of their visiting the various German courts, such as those of Cologne and Mainz, or even the Hungarian one, though it is only known that they visited a number of Christian shrines. They reached Rome before Easter.

== Reception at the Papal court ==
Pope Nicholas II convened a synod in Rome at Easter which both Tostig and Ealdred attended, Tostig reportedly being given a seat next to the Pope himself. Giso and Walter were ordained without difficulty and Giso's new bishopric was granted a papal privilege, but Ealdred was not so lucky. Nicholas was one of the reformers fighting breaches of canon law, and Ealdred was accused, partly on the basis of his own testimony to the synod, of being guilty of pluralism (the holding of more than one ecclesiastical office at once), simony (the corrupt purchasing of ecclesiastical office), and unauthorised translation (transfer from one see to another). On 3 May 1061 the Pope ruled against Lindsey being transferred to Ealdred's jurisdiction, and in the end Ealdred was deprived of both the bishopric of Worcester and the archbishopric of York. Tostig responded by threatening to end England's payment of Peter's Pence in future, but without success, and the embassy therefore set off on their homeward journey.

== Among thieves ==
Soon after leaving Rome, perhaps even on the first day, while they were travelling along the Via Cassia, they "fell among thieves", as the Vita Ædwardi Regis puts it. These robbers, led by an enemy of the Roman reformers, the Tuscan nobleman Count Gerard of Galeria, deprived the embassy members of everything they had, even in some cases their clothes, and reportedly killed or injured some of the party. They intended to hold Tostig prisoner, but when the Northumbrian Gospatric, conspicuous for his fine apparel, told them that he was Tostig they believed him and let the others go. Giving the earl and the bishops time to make good their retreat, he at length admitted that he was not Tostig at all. Fortunately for him, the robbers admired his courage enough to spare his life, and indeed gave him back everything they had stolen from him, allowing him to go his way in peace.

== In Rome again ==
The main body of the embassy returned to Rome and again saw Pope Nicholas, who was now in a different frame of mind, shamed by this proof of his inability to keep order in his own domains. He did what he could for them, anathematizing Gerard by the snuffing of candles and reopening the question of Ealdred's ordination. This time Tostig's pleading, Ealdred's humility, and the support of Cardinal Hildebrand combined to sway the synod in Ealdred's favour. The verdict, according to William of Malmesbury's Vita Wulfstani, was that he was reinstated in the archbishopric of York provided that Worcester was left to some other candidate. The Pope distributed gifts to the Englishmen, and also warning words to Ealdred that he should look to his future behaviour, "so that you may never cause us to repent of the mercy and kindness that we have had towards you".

== Journey home ==
Bishop Giso, and perhaps also Bishop Walter, must already have left Rome, since Giso reached England in the second half of June 1061. It is not known when Ealdred and Tostig left. Their work must have been completed by the end of June, when Pope Nicholas left Rome, or at the latest by 27 July, when he died, and it is likely that they made their way home to England during the autumn of that year. They perhaps travelled with two papal legates who had been assigned the task of supervising Church matters in England, and especially of seeing that Worcester was given a new bishop rather than being kept by Ealdred, though it is also possible that the legates followed some weeks or months after them, the historical evidence on this point being conflicting. Tostig's party again visited various shrines, and stopped at Reims to bury young Burgheard, whose death was perhaps the result of injuries dealt out by Count Gerard's robbers and who had expressed the wish to be buried there.

== Aftermath ==
Tostig returned to Northumbria after an absence of perhaps the better part of a year to learn that Malcolm Canmore, King of Scotland, who had sworn an oath of brotherhood with him, had conducted a large-scale raid on his earldom. Good relations between the two were however restored, and they remained at peace for the rest of Tostig's life.

The papal legates were presented to king Edward, and then began a tour of England to enquire into the conduct of church business throughout the kingdom. They were accompanied by Ealdred, who led them to Worcester and left them in the care of Prior Wulfstan. Highly impressed by Wulfstan's piety and austerity, they returned to the king's court and recommended him as the next bishop of Worcester, and to this post he was consequently ordained in York by Ealdred himself. Ealdred then returned to Worcester, leaving Wulfstan to deputise for him in York, and took advantage of the new bishop's absence to strip Worcester of some of its most lucrative episcopal assets. Wulfstan later regained many of these by negotiation, but did not fully recover the see's estates until after Ealdred's death.
