= Gisa (bishop of Wells) =

11th-century Bishop of Wells

- Bishop of Wells
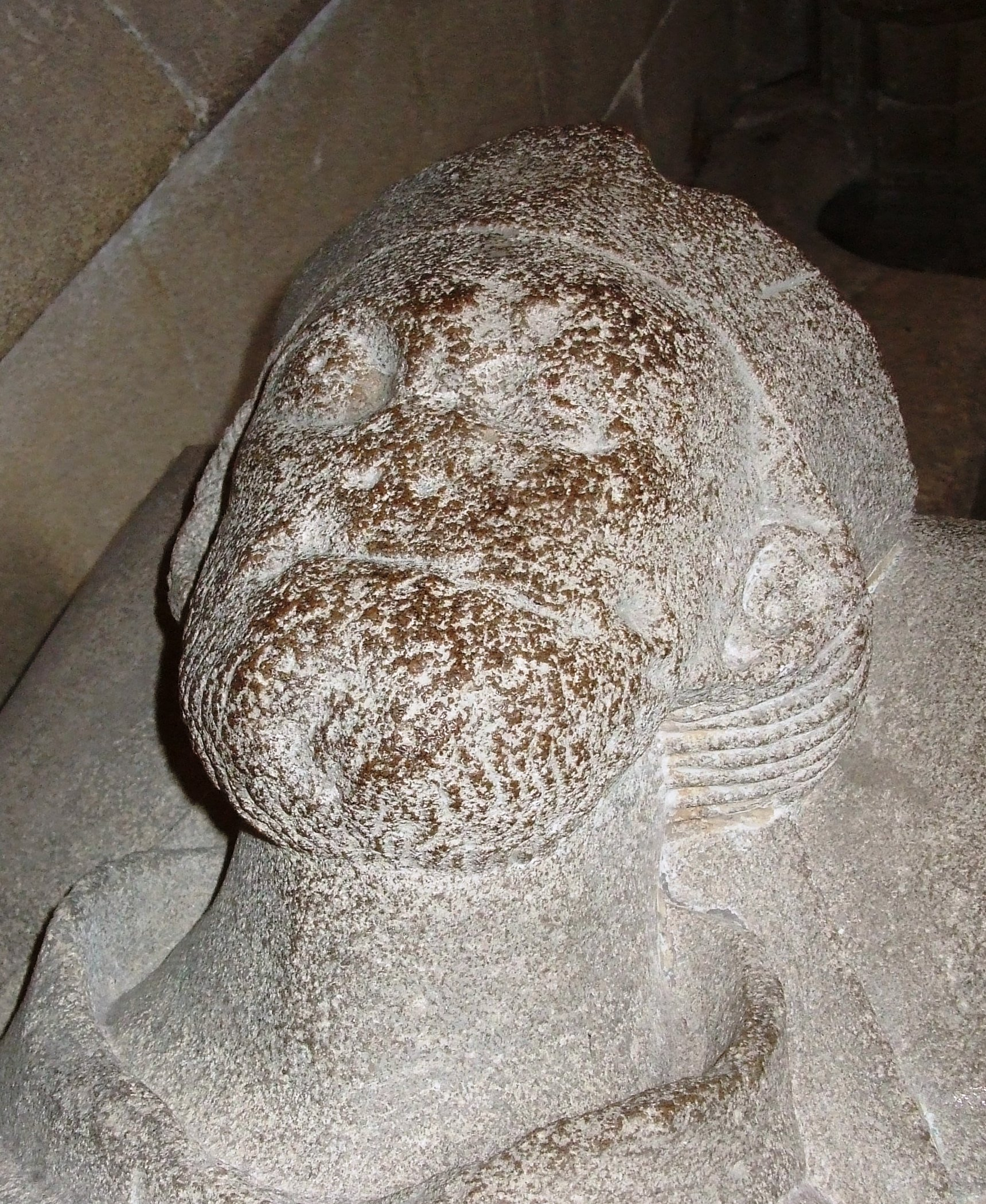
- Gisa's effigy on his tomb in Wells Cathedral
- Elected: January 1060 or January 1061
- Term ended: 1088
- Predecessor: Duduc
- Successor: John of Tours
- Other post: royal chaplain

Orders
- Consecration: 15 April 1061 by Pope Nicholas II

Personal details
- Born: Lorraine
- Died: 1088
- Buried: Wells Cathedral

Gisa (also written Giso; died 1088) was Bishop of Wells from 1060 to 1088. A native of Lorraine, Gisa came to England as a chaplain to King Edward the Confessor. After his appointment to Wells, he travelled to Rome rather than be consecrated by Stigand, the Archbishop of Canterbury. As bishop, Gisa added buildings to his cathedral, introduced new saints to his diocese, and instituted the office of archdeacon in his diocese. After the Norman Conquest, Gisa took part in the consecration of Lanfranc, the new Archbishop of Canterbury, and attended Lanfranc's church councils. His tomb in Wells Cathedral was opened in the 20th century and a cross was discovered in his tomb.

== Life ==
Gisa was born in Lorraine, probably the village of St Trond in modern Belgium, and was among a number of foreign churchmen brought to England by King Edward the Confessor. At first he held the position of king's chaplain, but in January 1060 or possibly January 1061 he was elected to become Bishop of Wells. Pope Nicholas II consecrated him on 15 April 1061 in Rome. He went to Rome for consecration because the current Archbishop of Canterbury was Stigand, whom successive popes had excommunicated for various irregularities, and travelled in company with another bishop—Walter of Lorraine, the Bishop of Hereford-elect—and Tostig Godwinson. The Vita Edwardi says that he was "most suitably and excellently trained".

On Gisa's arrival in the see he found the church there quite poor. He constructed cloisters to the north of Wells Cathedral and communal buildings to the south for the canons. He ordered the canons to live together under a rule, but exactly which rule it was is unknown. After the Norman Conquest, he introduced the veneration of new saints into his cathedral, as well as setting up an archdeacon in the diocese for the first time. He also wrote a history of the church. He worked to restore lands formerly held by the bishop or cathedral that had been unjustly acquired by others.

Gisa obtained land grants for the upkeep of the church and canons from King Edward the Confessor and the later kings Harold Godwinson and William I of England. He is mentioned many times in the Domesday Book of 1086 as the holder of land for the see, and was notorious for acquiring land throughout his bishopric. The only surviving writ of Harold's issued while Harold was king dealt with Giso's rights as bishop, and was addressed to Abbot Æthelnoth of Glastonbury, the sheriff of Somerset, and the thegns of Somerset.

After the Norman Conquest, Gisa supported William, the new king of England. He helped consecrate Lanfranc as Archbishop of Canterbury in 1070, and attended the Council of Windsor in 1072 and the Council of London in 1075. At a later church council, Giso asserted his authority over the abbots of Muchelney and Athelney, but failed to uphold the same claim in regards to Thurstan, Abbot of Glastonbury. Previously, he was credited as the author of Historiola de primordiis episcopatus Somersetensis, a history of the bishops of Wells, but he is no longer considered the author of that work.

Gisa died in 1088 and was buried at Wells Cathedral. When he died, he, along with Wulfstan, Bishop of Worcester, were the only remaining bishops from Edward the Confessor's appointments. His tomb was opened in 1979, and a cross with verses from the Mass for the Dead inscribed on it was found in his tomb.

== Citations ==
Catholic Church titles
Preceded by Duduc	Bishop of Wells c. 1060–1088	Succeeded by John of Tours
