= Godfrey of Chichester =

11th-century Bishop of Chichester

- Bishop of Chichester
- Appointed: 1088
- Term ended: 25 September 1088
- Predecessor: Stigand
- Successor: Ralph

Personal details
- Died: 25 September 1088

Godfrey (died 1088) was a medieval Bishop of Chichester. The first Bishop of Chichester was Stigand, who died in 1087; it seems that he was followed by Godfrey. Confusion over the succession was generated by William of Malmesbury, who suggested that Stigand was succeeded by a Bishop William.

== Background ==
Following the Norman Conquest of 1066, the English church was gradually restructured along the lines of the episcopal organization in Normandy. As part of this process, almost all of the Anglo-Saxon bishops of English Sees were replaced by Normans. In 1070, Æthelric II of Selsey was deposed from his episcopate and replaced by William the Conqueror's chaplain Stigand. Then under Stigand the see was transferred from Selsey to Chichester.

== Life ==
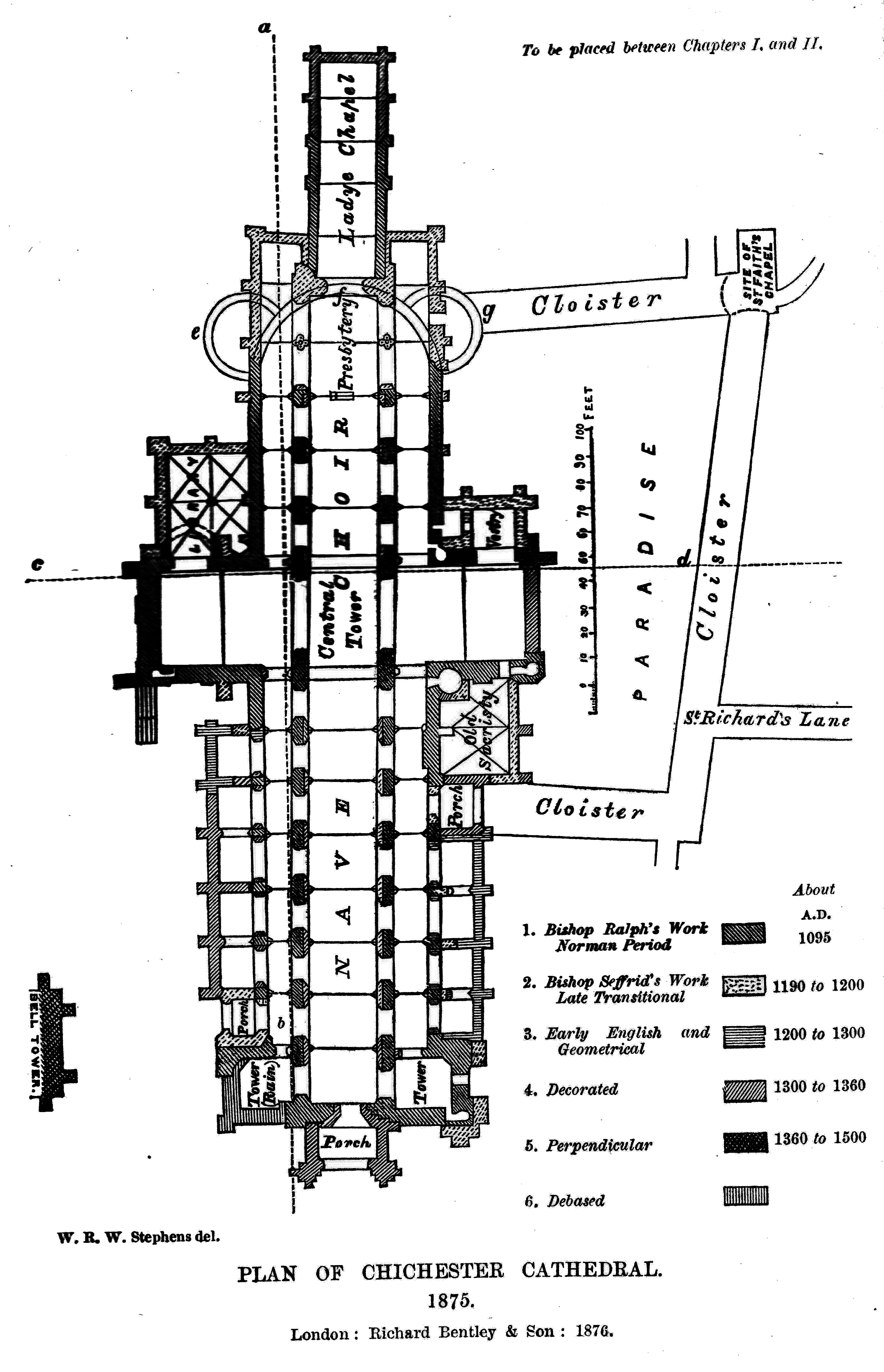
Plan of Chichester Cathedral

On Stigand's death, Godfrey was nominated, by Lanfranc, Archbishop of Canterbury, in 1087–1088; his nomination is recorded in the Acta Lanfranci. (Note: The Acta Lanfranci is a Latin continuation of the Anglo-Saxon Chronicle Manuscript A (known as the Winchester (or Parker) Chronicle), that covers church events in the period 1070–93.) Godfrey's death on 25 September 1088 is recorded in the Annales Cicestrensis, under 1088.

Little is known of his background, except he had been a royal chaplain. So little was known of him, that the medieval historians, William of Malmesbury and Florence of Worcester mistakenly called him William instead of Godfrey.

The historian Henry Mayr-Harting suggests that it can be shown that William of Malmesbury and Florence of Worcester were mistaken. There could be no doubt that Godfrey was the only bishop between Stigand and Ralph de Luffa. His evidence being Godfrey's profession of obedience (Note: Profession of Obedience by Godfrey, Bishop-elect of Chichester, to Lanfranc, archbishop of Canterbury and his successors (in the Canterbury, Chartae Antiqua. C. 117)) to Lanfranc, in 1088, also his name in both the Chichester and Winchester annals, and the leaden absolution that was buried with him.

== Lead cross ==
In Christianity, it was unusual for the deceased to be interred with the accoutrements of life, the only exceptions were the vestments with which some bishops were buried. According to Lanfranc's Constitutions a written absolution of sins would be placed on the chest of a dead monk in their tomb, while an inscribed lead cross served a similar purpose for prelates. In 1830, some workmen, digging a drain in part of the cathedral cloisters, discovered a lead cross. Four years earlier a stone coffin had been found in the same area, it is believed that the two were linked. The cross had a Latin inscription on it, the translation in English reads:

'We absolve you, O Bishop Godfrey, in place of St. Peter, prince of the Apostles, to whom the Lord gave the power of binding and releasing, so that in so far as your accusation warrants and the remission pertains to us. God the omnipotent redeemer, the kind forgiver, may be to you the healing of all your sins. Amen.' On 25 September, on the feast of St Fermin bishop and martyr, Bishop Godfrey of Chichester died. On the same day it was five days after the (new) moon.
(The first part of the text, as far as the amen, is a papal absolution relating to Godfrey).

== Vacant bishopric ==
After Godfrey's death, the see lay vacant until 1090 or 1091. The 19th-century historian W. R. W. Stephens said that the cause of the vacancy was due to "the grasping avarice of the red king, who protracted episcopal vacancies to the utmost extent, that he might enrich his own treasury with the temporalities of the sees." The church and William II were certainly in conflict for much of his reign. When bishoprics and abbeys became vacant William was able to take the revenues from them until the post was filled by a new bishop or abbot. William would often auction these positions off to the highest bidder.

== Citations ==
Catholic Church titles
Preceded by Stigand	Bishop of Chichester; 1088	Succeeded by Ralph de Luffa
