= Ealdred (archbishop of York) =

Archbishop of York from 1060 to 1069

- Archbishop of York
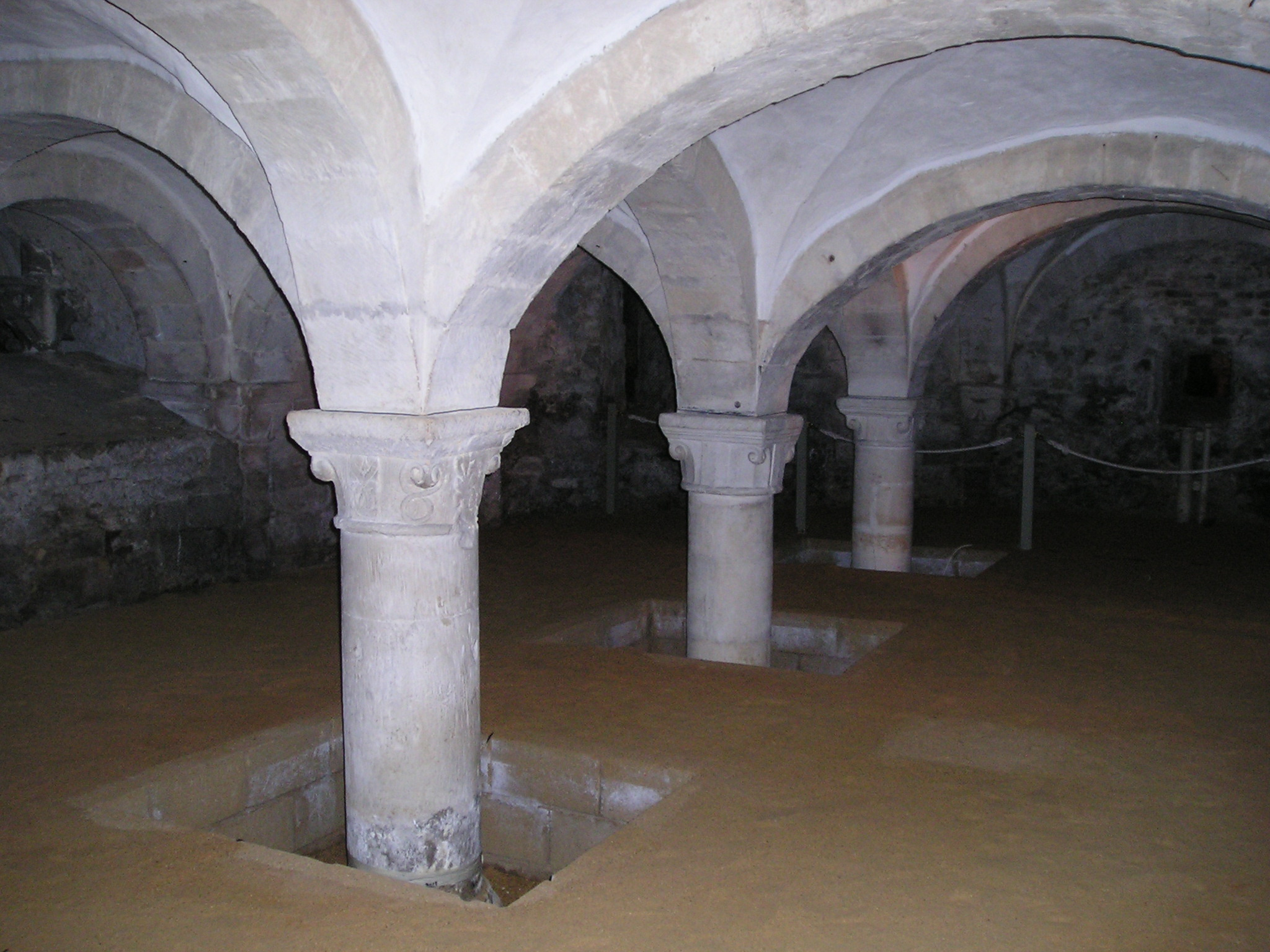
- Crypt of Gloucester Cathedral, which predates the Norman Conquest, and would have been contemporary with Ealdred's administration of Gloucester Abbey
- Elected: 25 December 1060
- Term ended: 11 September 1069
- Predecessor: Cynesige
- Successor: Thomas of Bayeux
- Other posts: Abbot of Tavistock; Bishop of Worcester

Orders
- Consecration: 1046

Personal details
- Died: 11 September 1069 York
- Buried: York Minster

Ealdred (or Aldred; died 11 September 1069) was Abbot of Tavistock, Bishop of Worcester, and Archbishop of York in early medieval England. He was related to a number of other ecclesiastics of the period. After becoming a monk at the monastery at Winchester, he was appointed Abbot of Tavistock Abbey in around 1027. In 1046, he was named to the Bishopric of Worcester. Ealdred, besides his episcopal duties, served Edward the Confessor, the King of England, as a diplomat and as a military leader. He worked to bring one of the king's relatives, Edward the Exile, back to England from Hungary to secure an heir for the childless king.

In 1058, he undertook a pilgrimage to Jerusalem, the first bishop from England to do so. As administrator of the Diocese of Hereford, he was involved in fighting against the Welsh, suffering two defeats at the hands of raiders before securing a settlement with Gruffydd ap Llywelyn, a Welsh ruler.

In 1060, Ealdred was elected to the archbishopric of York but had difficulty in obtaining papal approval for his appointment, managing to do so only when he promised not to hold the bishoprics of York and Worcester simultaneously. He helped secure the election of Wulfstan as his successor at Worcester. During his archiepiscopate, he built and embellished churches in his diocese and worked to improve his clergy by holding a synod which published regulations for the priesthood.

Some sources say that following King Edward the Confessor's death in 1066, it was Ealdred who crowned Harold Godwinson as King of England. Ealdred supported Harold as king, but when Harold was defeated at the Battle of Hastings, Ealdred backed Edgar the Ætheling and then endorsed King William the Conqueror, the Duke of Normandy and a distant relative of King Edward's. Ealdred crowned King William on Christmas Day in 1066. William never quite trusted Ealdred or the other English leaders, and Ealdred had to accompany William back to Normandy in 1067, but he had returned to York by the time of his death in 1069. Ealdred supported the churches and monasteries in his diocese with gifts and building projects.

== Early life ==
Ealdred was probably born in the west of England, and could be related to Lyfing, his predecessor as bishop of Worcester. His family, from Devonshire, may have been well-to-do. Another relative was Wilstan or Wulfstan, who under Ealdred's influence became Abbot of Gloucester. Ealdred was a monk in the cathedral chapter at Winchester Cathedral before becoming abbot of Tavistock Abbey about 1027, an office he held until about 1043. Even after leaving the abbacy of Tavistock, he continued to hold two properties from the abbey until his death. No contemporary documents relating to Ealdred's time as abbot have been discovered.

Ealdred was made bishop of Worcester in 1046, a position he held until his resignation in 1062. He may have acted as suffragan, or subordinate bishop, to his predecessor Lyfing before formally assuming the bishopric, as from about 1043 Ealdred witnessed as an episcopus, or bishop, and a charter from 1045 or early 1046 names Sihtric as abbot of Tavistock. Lyfing died on 26 March 1046, and Ealdred became bishop of Worcester shortly after. However, Ealdred did not receive the other two dioceses Lyfing had held, Crediton and Cornwall; King Edward the Confessor (reigned 1043–1066) granted these to Leofric, who combined the two sees at Crediton in 1050.

== Bishop and royal advisor ==
Ealdred was an advisor to King Edward the Confessor and was often involved in the royal government. He was also a military leader, and in 1046 he led an unsuccessful expedition against the Welsh. This was in retaliation for a raid led by the Welsh rulers Gruffydd ap Rhydderch, Rhys ap Rhydderch, and Gruffydd ap Llywelyn. Ealdred's expedition was betrayed by some Welsh soldiers who were serving with the English, and Ealdred was defeated.

In 1050, Ealdred went to Rome "on the king's errand", apparently to secure papal approval to move the seat, or centre, of the bishopric of Crediton to Exeter. It may also have been to secure the release of the king from a vow to go on pilgrimage, if sources from after the Norman Conquest are to be believed. While in Rome, he attended a papal council, along with his fellow English bishop Herman. That same year, as Ealdred was returning to England he met Sweyn, a son of Godwin, Earl of Wessex, and probably absolved Sweyn for having abducted the abbess of Leominster Abbey in 1046. Through Ealdred's intercession, Sweyn was restored to his earldom, which he had lost after abducting the abbess and murdering his cousin Beorn Estrithson. Ealdred helped Sweyn not only because Ealdred was a supporter of Earl Godwin's family but because Sweyn's earldom was close to his bishopric. As recently as 1049, Irish raiders had allied with Gruffydd ap Rhydderch of Gwent in raiding along the River Usk. Ealdred unsuccessfully tried to drive off the raiders, but was again routed by the Welsh. This failure underscored Ealdred's need for a strong earl in the area to protect against raids. Normally, the bishop of Hereford would have led the defence in the absence of an Earl of Hereford, but in 1049 the incumbent, Æthelstan, was blind, so Ealdred took on the role of defender.

== Diplomatic travels ==
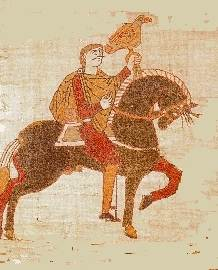
Harold Godwinson, from the Bayeux Tapestry, whom Ealdred failed to catch in 1051

Earl Godwin's rebellion against the king in 1051 came as a blow to Ealdred, who was a supporter of the earl and his family. Ealdred was present at the royal council at London that banished Godwin's family. Later in 1051, when he was sent to intercept Harold Godwinson and his brothers as they fled England after their father's outlawing, Ealdred "could not, or would not" capture the brothers. The banishment of Ealdred's patron came shortly after the death of Ælfric Puttoc, the Archbishop of York. York and Worcester had long had close ties, and the two sees had often been held in plurality, or at the same time. Ealdred probably wanted to become Archbishop of York after Ælfric's death, but his patron's eclipse led to the king appointing Cynesige, a royal chaplain, instead. In September 1052, though, Godwin returned from exile, and his family was restored to power. By late 1053, Ealdred was once more in royal favour. At some point, he was alleged to have accompanied Swein on a pilgrimage to the Holy Land, but proof is lacking. (Note: If he did accompany Swein, the historian Frank Barlow argues that it was probably in 1058.)

In 1054, King Edward sent Ealdred to Germany to obtain Emperor Henry III's help in returning Edward the Exile, son of Edmund Ironside, to England. Edmund (reigned 1016) was an elder half-brother of King Edward the Confessor, and Edmund's son Edward was in Hungary with King Andrew I, having left England as an infant after his father's death and the accession of Cnut as King of England. In this mission Ealdred was somewhat successful and obtained insight into the working of the German church during a stay of a year with Hermann II, the Archbishop of Cologne. He also was impressed with the buildings he saw, and later incorporated some of the German styles into his own constructions. The main objective of the mission, however, was to secure the return of Edward; but this failed, mainly because Henry III's relations with the Hungarians were strained, and the emperor was unable or unwilling to help Ealdred. Ealdred was able to discover that Edward was alive, and had a place at the Hungarian court. (Note: Edward eventually returned to England in 1057, but died shortly thereafter.) Although some sources say Ealdred attended the coronation of Emperor Henry IV, this is not possible, as on the date Henry was crowned, Ealdred was in England consecrating an abbot.

Ealdred had returned to England by 1055 and brought with him a copy of the Pontificale Romano-Germanicum, a set of liturgies. An extant copy of this work, currently manuscript Cotton Vitellus E xii, has been identified as a copy owned by Ealdred. It appears likely that the Rule of Chrodegang, a continental set of ordinances for the communal life of secular canons, was introduced into England by Ealdred sometime before 1059. Probably, he brought it back from Germany, possibly in concert with Harold.

After Ealdred's return to England he took charge of the sees of Hereford and Ramsbury. Ealdred also administered Winchcombe Abbey and Gloucester Abbey. The authors of the Handbook of British Chronology Third Edition say he was named bishop of Hereford in 1056, holding the see until he resigned it in 1060, but other sources say he merely administered the see while it was vacant, or that he was bishop of Hereford from 1055 to 1060.

Ealdred became involved with the see of Ramsbury after its bishop, Herman, got into a dispute with King Edward over the movement of the seat of his bishopric to Malmesbury Abbey. Herman wished to move the seat of his see, but Edward refused permission for the move. Ealdred was a close associate of Herman's, and the historian H. R. Loyn called Herman "something of an alter ego" to Ealdred. According to the medieval chronicler John of Worcester, Ealdred was given the see of Ramsbury to administer while Herman remained outside England. Herman returned in 1058 and resumed his bishopric. There is no contemporary documentary evidence of Ealdred's administration of Ramsbury.

== Welsh affairs, Jerusalem, and Worcester ==
The king again employed Ealdred as a diplomat in 1056, when he assisted Earls Harold and Leofric in negotiations with the Welsh. Edward sent Ealdred after the death in battle of Bishop Leofgar of Hereford, who had attacked Gruffydd ap Llywelyn after encouragement from the king. However, Leofgar lost the battle and his life, and Edward had to sue for peace. Although details of the negotiations are lacking, Gruffydd ap Llywelyn swore loyalty to King Edward, but the oath may not have had any obligations on Gruffydd's part to Edward. The exact terms of the submission are not known in total, but Gruffydd was not required to assist Edward in war nor attend Edward's court. Ealdred was rewarded with the administration of the see of Hereford, which he held until 1061, and was appointed Archbishop of York. The diocese had suffered a serious raid from the Welsh in 1055, and during his administration, Ealdred continued the rebuilding of the cathedral church as well as securing the cathedral chapter's rights. Ealdred was granted the administration so that the area might have someone with experience with the Welsh in charge.

In 1058, Ealdred made a pilgrimage to Jerusalem, the first English bishop to make the journey. He travelled through Hungary, and the Anglo-Saxon Chronicle said that "he went to Jerusalem in such state as no one had done before him." While in Jerusalem he made a gift of a gold chalice to the church of the Holy Sepulchre. It is possible that the reason Ealdred travelled through Hungary was to arrange the travel of Edward the Exile's family to England. Another possibility is that he wished to search for other possible heirs to King Edward in Hungary. It is not known exactly when Edward the Exile's family returned to England, whether they returned with Edward in 1057, or sometime later, so it is only a possibility that they returned with Ealdred in 1058.

Very little documentary evidence is available from Ealdred's time as Bishop of Worcester. Only five leases that he signed survive, and all date from 1051 to 1053. Two further leases exist in Hemming's Cartulary as copies only. How the diocese of Worcester was administered when Ealdred was abroad is unclear, although it appears Wulfstan, the prior of the cathedral chapter, performed the religious duties in the diocese. On the financial side, the Evesham Chronicle states that Æthelwig, who became abbot of Evesham Abbey in 1058, administered Worcester before he became abbot.

== Archbishop of York ==
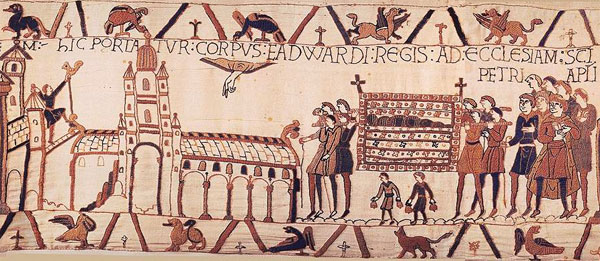
The funeral cortège of Edward the Confessor, from the Bayeux Tapestry

Cynesige, the archbishop of York, died on 22 December 1060, and Ealdred was elected Archbishop of York on Christmas Day, 1060. Although a bishop was promptly appointed to Hereford, none was named to Worcester, and it appears Ealdred intended to retain Worcester along with York, which several of his predecessors had done. There were a few reasons for this, one of which was political, as the kings of England preferred to appoint bishops from the south to the northern bishoprics, hoping to counter the northern tendency towards separatism. Another reason was that York was not a wealthy see, and Worcester was. Holding Worcester, along with York, allowed the archbishop sufficient revenue to support himself.

In 1061, Ealdred travelled to Rome to receive the pallium, the symbol of an archbishop's authority. Journeying with him was Tostig, another son of Earl Godwin, who was now earl of Northumbria. William of Malmesbury says that Ealdred, by "amusing the simplicity of King Edward and alleging the custom of his predecessors, had acquired, more by bribery than by reason, the archbishopric of York while still holding his former see." On his arrival in Rome, however, charges of simony, or the buying of ecclesiastical office, and lack of learning were brought against him, and his elevation to York was refused by Pope Nicholas II, who also deposed him from Worcester. The story of Ealdred being deposed comes from the Vita Edwardi, a life of Edward the Confessor, but the Vita Wulfstani, an account of the life of Ealdred's successor at Worcester, Wulfstan, says Nicholas refused the pallium until a promise to find a replacement for Worcester was given by Ealdred. Yet another chronicler, John of Worcester, mentions nothing of any trouble in Rome, and when discussing the appointment of Wulfstan, says Wulfstan was elected freely and unanimously by the clergy and people. John of Worcester also claims that at Wulfstan's consecration, Stigand, the archbishop of Canterbury extracted a promise from Ealdred that neither he nor his successors would lay claim to any jurisdiction over the diocese of Worcester. Given that John of Worcester wrote his chronicle after the eruption of the Canterbury–York supremacy struggle, the story of Ealdred renouncing any claims to Worcester needs to be considered suspect.

For whatever reason, Ealdred gave up the see of Worcester in 1062, when papal legates arrived in England to hold a council and make sure Ealdred relinquished Worcester. This happened at Easter in 1062. Ealdred was succeeded by Wulfstan, chosen by Ealdred, but John of Worcester relates that Ealdred had a hard time deciding between Wulfstan and Æthelwig. The legates had urged the selection of Wulfstan because of his saintliness. Because the position of Stigand, the archbishop of Canterbury, was irregular, Wulfstan sought and received consecration as a bishop from Ealdred. Normally, Wulfstan would have gone to the archbishop of Canterbury, as the see of Worcester was within Canterbury's province. Although Ealdred gave up the bishopric, the appointment of Wulfstan was one that allowed Ealdred to continue his considerable influence on the see of Worcester. Ealdred retained a number of estates belonging to Worcester. Even after the Norman Conquest, Ealdred still controlled some events in Worcester, and it was Ealdred, not Wulfstan, who opposed Urse d'Abetot's attempt to extend the castle of Worcester into the cathedral after the Norman Conquest.

While archbishop, Ealdred built at Beverley, expanding on the building projects begun by his predecessor Cynesige, as well as repairing and expanding other churches in his diocese. He also built refectories for the canons at York and Southwell. He also was the one bishop who published ecclesiastical legislation during Edward the Confessor's reign, attempting to discipline and reform the clergy. He held a synod of his clergy shortly before 1066.

== After the death of Edward the Confessor ==
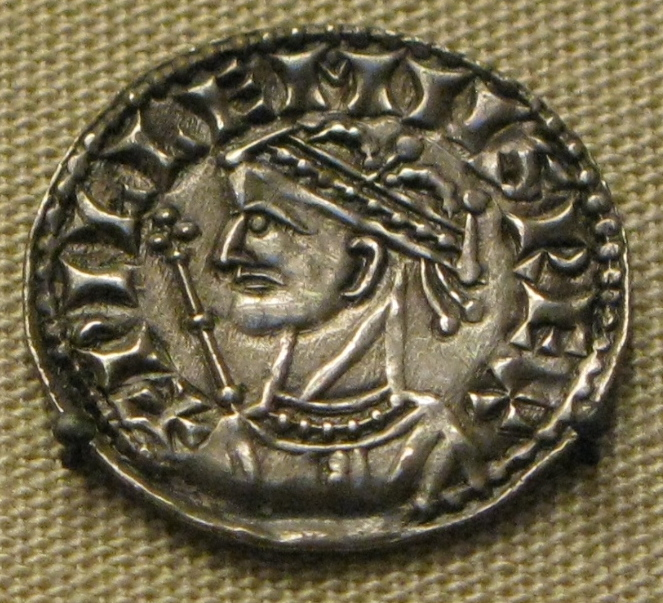
A penny from the time of William I

John of Worcester, a medieval chronicler, said Ealdred crowned King Harold II in 1066, although the Norman chroniclers mention Stigand as the officiating prelate. Given Ealdred's known support of Godwin's family, John of Worcester is probably correct. Stigand's position as archbishop was canonically suspect, and as earl Harold had not allowed Stigand to consecrate one of the earl's churches, it is unlikely Harold would have allowed Stigand to perform the much more important royal coronation. Arguments for Stigand having performed the coronation, however, rely on the fact that no other English source names the ecclesiastic who performed the ceremony; all Norman sources name Stigand as the presider. In all events, Ealdred and Harold were close, and Ealdred supported Harold's bid to become king. Ealdred perhaps accompanied Harold when the new king went to York and secured the support of the northern magnates shortly after Harold's consecration.

According to the medieval chronicler Geoffrey Gaimar, after the Battle of Stamford Bridge, Harold entrusted the loot gained from Harald Hardrada to Ealdred. Gaimar asserts that King Harold did this because he had heard of Duke William's landing in England, and needed to rush south to counter it. After the Battle of Hastings, Ealdred joined the group who tried to elevate Edgar the Ætheling, Edward the Exile's son, as king, but eventually he submitted to William the Conqueror at Berkhamsted. John of Worcester says the group supporting Edgar vacillated over what to do while William ravaged the countryside, which led to Ealdred and Edgar's submission to William.

Ealdred crowned William king on Christmas Day 1066. An innovation in William's coronation ceremony was that before the actual crowning, Ealdred asked the assembled crowd, in English, if it was their wish that William be crowned king. The Bishop of Coutances then did the same, but in Norman French. In March 1067, William took Ealdred with him when William returned to Normandy, along with the other English leaders Earl Edwin of Mercia, Earl Morcar, Edgar the Ætheling, and Archbishop Stigand. Ealdred at Whitsun 1068 performed the coronation of Matilda, William's wife. The Laudes Regiae, or song commending a ruler, that was performed at Matilda's coronation may have been composed by Ealdred himself for the occasion. In 1069, when the northern thegns rebelled against William and attempted to install Edgar the Ætheling as king, Ealdred continued to support William. He was the only northern leader to support William, however. Ealdred was back at York by 1069. He died there on 11 September 1069, and his body was buried in his episcopal cathedral. He may have taken an active part in trying to calm the rebellions in the north in 1068 and 1069. The medieval chronicler William of Malmesbury records a story that when the new sheriff of Worcester, Urse d'Abetot, encroached on the cemetery of the cathedral chapter for Worcester Cathedral, Ealdred pronounced a rhyming curse on him, saying "Thou are called Urse. May you have God's curse." (Note: The exact sentence in Bates is "Urse's refusal to move it drew a poetic Old English curse from the archbishop, which began "Thou are called Urse. May you have God's curse."")

== Legacy ==
After Ealdred's death, one of the restraints on William's treatment of the English was removed. Ealdred was one of a few native Englishmen whom William appears to have trusted, and his death led to fewer attempts to integrate Englishmen into the administration, although such efforts did not entirely stop. In 1070, a church council was held at Westminster, and a number of bishops were deposed. By 1073, there were only two Englishmen in episcopal sees, and by the time of William's death in 1087, there was only one, Wulfstan II of Worcester.

Ealdred did much to restore discipline in the monasteries and churches under his authority, and was liberal with gifts to the churches of his diocese. He built the monastic church of St Peter at Gloucester (now Gloucester Cathedral, though nothing of his fabric remains), then part of his diocese of Worcester. He also repaired a large part of Beverley Minster in the diocese of York, adding a presbytery and an unusually splendid painted ceiling covering "all the upper part of the church from the choir to the tower ... intermingled with gold in various ways, and in a wonderful fashion." He added a pulpit "in German style" of bronze, gold, and silver, surmounted by an arch with a rood cross in the same materials; these were examples of the lavish decorations added to important churches in the years before the conquest.

Ealdred encouraged Folcard, a monk of Canterbury, to write the Life of Saint John of Beverley. This was part of Ealdred's promotion of the cult of Saint John, who had been canonised only since 1037. Along with the Pontificale, Ealdred may have brought back from Cologne the first manuscript of the Cambridge Songs to enter England, a collection of Latin Goliardic songs which became famous in the Middle Ages. The historian Michael Lapidge suggests that the Laudes Regiae, which are included in Cotton Vitellius E xii, might have been composed by Ealdred, or a member of his household. Another historian, H. J. Cowdrey, argued that the laudes were composed at Winchester. These praise songs are probably the same performed at Matilda's coronation, but might have been used at other court ceremonies before Ealdred's death.

Historians have seen Ealdred as an "old-fashioned prince-bishop". Others say he "raised the see of York from its former rustic state". He was known for his generosity and for his diplomatic and administrative abilities. After the Conquest, Ealdred provided a degree of continuity between the pre- and post-Conquest worlds. One modern historian feels it was Ealdred who was behind the compilation of the D version of the Anglo-Saxon Chronicle, and gives a date in the 1050s as its composition. Certainly, Ealdred is one of the leading figures in the work, and it is likely one of his clerks compiled the version.

== Citations ==
Catholic Church titles
Preceded by Lyfing	Abbot of Tavistock; 1027–43	Succeeded by Sihtric
Preceded by Leofgar of Hereford	Bishop of Hereford; 1056–1060	Succeeded by Walter of Lorraine
Preceded by Lyfing	Bishop of Worcester; 1046–1062	Succeeded by Wulfstan
Preceded by Cynesige	Archbishop of York; 1061–1069	Succeeded by Thomas of Bayeux
