= Robert de Losinga =

Robert de Losinga may refer to

- Another name for Robert the Lotharingian
- Robert de Losinga, Abbot of New Minster, Winchester, and father of Herbert de Losinga, Bishop of Norwich
