= Stigand of Selsey =

11th-century Bishop of Selsey and later Bishop of Chichester

- Bishop of Chichester
- Province: Canterbury
- Appointed: c. 1075
- Term ended: 1087
- Predecessor: Æthelric II (bishop of Selsey)
- Successor: Godfrey (bishop of Chichester)
- Other post: royal chaplain
- Previous post: Bishop of Selsey 1070–c. 1075

Orders
- Consecration: before 29 August 1070

Personal details
- Died: 1087
- Denomination: Roman Catholic

Stigand (died 1087) was the last Bishop of Selsey, and first Bishop of Chichester.

== Life ==
Following the Norman Conquest of 1066, the English church was gradually restructured along the lines of the episcopal organization in Normandy. As part of this process, almost all of the Anglo-Saxon bishops of English sees were replaced by Normans. Archbishop Stigand of Canterbury was deposed in 1070, accused of holding the archiepiscopal see in plurality with the bishopric of Winchester and of having seizing the archiepiscopate irregularly after the flight of his predecessor Robert of Jumièges. Æthelric II of Selsey was deposed from his episcopate at the same time, probably because of his association with Archbishop Stigand.

King William's chaplain, who was also called Stigand, replaced Æthelric as Bishop of Selsey within a week of Æthelric's deposition. Stigand was listed as an assisting bishop at the consecration of Lanfranc to the archbishopric of Canterbury on 29 August 1070; therefore Stigand must have been appointed as bishop prior to that date.

At the Council of London in 1075 the South Saxon see was transferred to Chichester. Some sources claim that Stigand continued to use the title Bishop of Selsey until 1082, before adopting the new title of Bishop of Chichester, indicating that the transfer took several years to complete.

The medieval chronicler William of Malmesbury said, in Gesta pontificum Anglorum, that there had been a monastery dedicated to St Peter, as well as a convent in Chichester. Presumably the minister became the new seat of the diocese with the cathedral sharing its site with that of the parish church. It was probably after the rebuilding of the cathedral in the 12th century that the parishioners were assigned the nave altar, this was known as the sub-deanery church of St. Peter the Great. They were then moved, at the end of the 15th century, to the north transept of the cathedral and remained there until the 19th century when a new parish church was built adjacent to the cathedral and dedicated to St Peter. Traditionally, the building of the cathedral has been credited to one of Stigand's successors, Ralph de Luffa, but the architectural historian R. D. H. Gem argues it is possible that Stigand began the building of Chichester Cathedral. Tatton-Brown goes further by suggesting that "most of the first church was completed as far as the fourth bay in the nave by the time of Bishop Luffa". The problem for historians is that virtually no legitimate charters or other documents survive from Stigand's time. The loss of most of the documents has been attributed to the sacking of the cathedral by the Parliamentarians in 1642, during the English Civil War.

The cathedral, probably planned during Stigand's tenure, consisted of an eight-bay nave with flanking western towers; however evidence from the fabric shows that only the eastern four bays were built in the first phase.

== Dispute with the King and Archbishop ==
The organization of the Chichester diocese into prebends may have begun under Stigand. Stigand's organisational skills brought him into conflict with Lanfranc over the archbishops' peculiars in Sussex, which were numerous. Lanfranc wrote a letter to Stigand instructing him not to meddle with the Sussex parishes belonging to the see of Canterbury and he also prohibited any of the clergy in those peculiars from attending Stigand's diocesan synods.

Stigand also managed to attract the displeasure of King William I. William had selected a monk from Marmoutier Abbey to be the first abbot of Battle Abbey. The king had requested that Stigand travel to Battle to consecrate the new abbot; however, Stigand refused and insisted that the abbot elect instead travel to Chichester to be consecrated. The king was incensed and compelled Stigand to go to Battle to consecrate the monk before the altar of St. Martin. The abbey was to remain outside Stigand's jurisdiction and to become part of the king's own chapel. As a further humiliation, Stigand and his retinue were forbidden to be lodged or boarded within the grounds of the abbey on the occasion of the consecration.

Stigand remained Bishop of Chichester until his death in 1087, possibly on 29 August.

== Citations ==
Catholic Church titles
Preceded by Æthelric II	Bishop of Selsey; 1070–c. 1075	see moved to Chichester
New title see moved from Selsey	Bishop of Chichester c. 1075–1087	Succeeded by Godfrey
