= Duduc =

11th-century Bishop of Wells

Dudoc
- Bishop of Wells
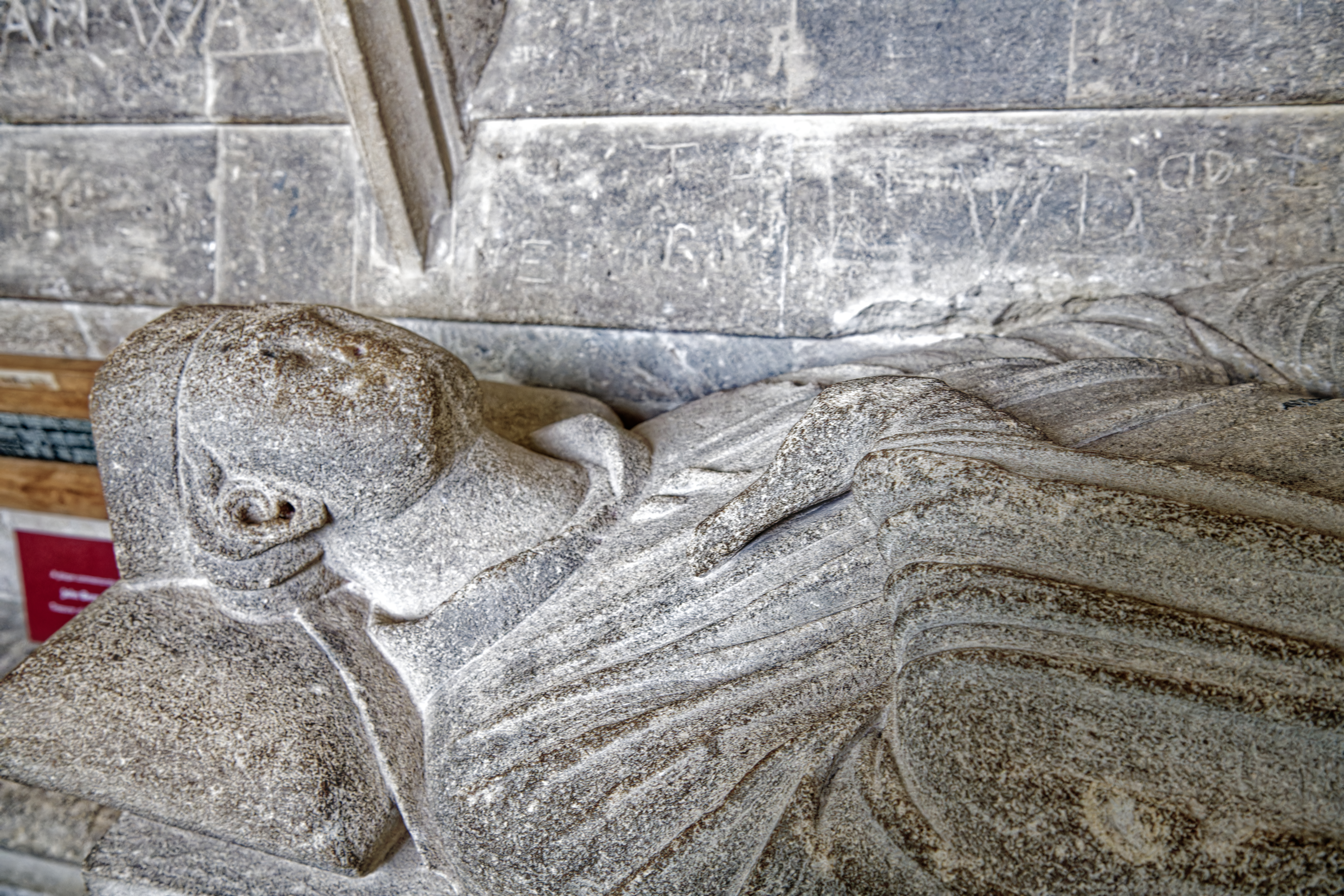
- Appointed: 1033
- Term ended: 18 January 1060
- Predecessor: Merewith
- Successor: Gisa
- Other post: royal chaplain

Orders
- Consecration: 11 June 1033

Personal details
- Died: 18 January 1060

Duduc (or Dudoc) was a medieval Bishop of Wells.

== Life ==
Dudoc was a native of Lorraine or of Saxony. He was a priest for Cnut before being named Bishop of Wells by Cnut in 1033. He was consecrated 11 June 1033.

King Edward the Confessor sent Dudoc along with two abbots to Rheims in 1049 on a diplomatic mission, where he attended the Council of Reims held by Pope Leo IX.

Dudoc died on 18 January 1060. He left his estates and vestments to his church, but the will was invalidated by King Edward, partly at the request of Archbishop Stigand, who received one of the estates instead.

== Citations ==
Catholic Church titles
Preceded by Merewith	Bishop of Wells; 1033–1060	Succeeded by Gisa
