= Merewith =

11th-century Bishop of Wells

- Bishop of Wells
- Elected: c. 1024
- Term ended: April 1033
- Predecessor: Brihtwine
- Successor: Duduc
- Other post: Abbot of Glastonbury

Orders
- Consecration: c. 1024

Personal details
- Died: April 1033

Merewith (Note: Brihtwig or Merehwit or Beorhtwig or Brihtwig Merewit) was an Anglo-Saxon Bishop of Wells. He was abbot of Glastonbury Abbey prior to being consecrated bishop about 1024. He died on either 11 April or 12 April 1033.

== Citations ==
Christian titles
Preceded by Brihtwine	Bishop of Wells c. 1024–1033	Succeeded by Duduc
