= Walter of Lorraine =

11th-century Bishop of Hereford

Walter
- Bishop of Hereford
- Appointed: December 1060
- Term ended: 1079
- Predecessor: Ealdred
- Successor: Robert the Lotharingian

Orders
- Consecration: 15 April 1061 by Pope Nicholas II

Personal details
- Died: 1079
- Denomination: Roman Catholic Church

Walter of Lorraine (or Walter of Lotharingia; died 1079) was a medieval Bishop of Hereford.

== Life ==
Walter was a native of Lorraine, although some sources state he was a Norman. He was chaplain to Edith of Wessex, wife of Edward the Confessor sometime before his appointment as bishop. He was appointed to the see of Hereford about Christmas 1060. His appointment was because Aldred, the Bishop of Worcester, who had been supervising the see of Hereford after the death of Leofgar in 1056, was appointed Archbishop of York and this opened the way for an appointment to Hereford.

Walter was consecrated on 15 April 1061 by Pope Nicholas II at Rome. He, along with Giso, who was elected to the see of Wells, and Tostig Godwinson, went to Rome for consecration because Stigand, the Archbishop of Canterbury, was excommunicated and could not consecrate bishops. They were unable to have the Archbishop of York consecrate them, because Ealdred, who was the appointee to York, had not yet received his pallium, the symbol of the authority of an archbishop, and was in fact traveling to Rome with Giso and Walter to receive it. Walter seems to have been little involved in public affairs after his appointment as bishop.

After the Norman Conquest of England, Walter swore loyalty to William the Conqueror at Berkhamsted after the Battle of Hastings. He attended the church councils held at Windsor in 1072 and at London in 1075. But otherwise, his diocesan business is unclear, as no charters of his survive.

The Vita Edwardi, the saint's life of King Edward the Confessor of England, said of Walter that he was "most suitably and excellently trained in office".

Walter died in 1079. The medieval chronicler William of Malmesbury records that he was stabbed to death while attempting to rape a seamstress, but reports this as rumor, so it is unclear if that was actually how Walter died. No tomb survives, and his burial place is unknown.

== Citations ==
Catholic Church titles
Preceded by Ealdred	Bishop of Hereford; 1061–1079	Succeeded by Robert the Lotharingian
