= Thurstan of Caen =

Thurstan of Caen was a Norman monk from the Abbey of Saint-Étienne, Caen who served as abbot of Glastonbury from c. 1077 to his death, some time between 1096 and 1100. He is chiefly notable for his aggressive introduction of new ecclesiastical practices, unwelcome to his Anglo-Saxon monks, and for its terrible consequences. In 1083 tension culminated in a massacre in which Thurstan's men-at-arms killed either two or three monks and wounded either fourteen or eighteen. He was returned to Normandy in disgrace, but is in later years found at the English royal court where he continued as Glastonbury's abbot in absentia.

== Background ==
The Norman Conquest of England and the appointment of Lanfranc as Archbishop of Canterbury in 1070 marked a new era in English monasticism. A clean sweep of English monasteries began in which Anglo-Saxon abbots were gradually replaced by monks from the Norman abbeys. These new abbots were generally well-educated, able administrators who were as a whole effective in revitalizing the English monastic order, but they were sometimes intolerant of their English houses' religious traditions and arrogant in their determination to expunge them. The abbot of Abingdon tried to erase all memory of his predecessor St Æthelwold, calling him an "English rustic"; the abbot of St Albans broke up the tombs of the "uncultured idiots" who had formerly held his office; the abbot of Malmesbury threw out the bones of previous abbots; and Lanfranc himself ended the commemoration of many Anglo-Saxon saints at Canterbury and enforced obedience at St Augustine's by whipping one monk and imprisoning others in chains. The most ill-judged appointment proved to be that of Thurstan of Caen to Glastonbury Abbey.

== Early career ==
Nothing is known of Thurstan's birth or antecedents. Under the patronage of Odo, Bishop of Bayeux, William the Conqueror's half-brother, he was sent to study at Liège, and became a monk of the Abbey of Saint-Étienne, Caen. His opportunity for advancement came when Æthelnoth, abbot of Glastonbury, was deposed at the Council of London in 1077 or 1078. Æthelnoth was, according to later Glastonbury tradition, notable for his squandering of the monastery's property, but it remained the richest of English abbeys. Thurstan was chosen to succeed him. In 1080 he distinguished himself at the Council of Gloucester, successfully defending his abbey's jurisdiction over the abbeys of Muchelney and Athelney against the rival claim of Giso, Bishop of Wells by reciting from memory the documents which vindicated his case. He also began to build a cruciform church in the Norman style, which, however, did not last, his successor Herluin pulling it down to make room for a more splendid church.

== The massacre ==
The monks of Glastonbury Abbey in the 11th century were of a somewhat conservative tendency, while Thurstan had more of the temperament of a conquering baron than of a churchman. The consequent disagreements between them were apparently not few, but one had tragic consequences. The Anglo-Saxon Chronicle blames Thurstan's "lack of wisdom in that he misgoverned his monks in many things". William of Malmesbury tells us that he tried to end "many ancient and favoured customs" and replace them with "certain practices according to the custom of his own country". John of Worcester is more specific:

Among other deeds resulting from his stupidity, he spurned the Gregorian chant, and began to force the monks to abandon it and then learn to sing the chant of a certain William of Fecamp. This they undertook reluctantly, especially since in regard to this, as to other ecclesiastical customs, they had grown up in the practice of the Roman church.

The precise nature of this musical disagreement has been understood by historians in various ways, notable theories being that instead of chanting in the manner the monks were accustomed to Thurstan tried to make them use the style introduced to Fécamp Abbey by William of Dijon, or alternatively the style in use at Bec Abbey. In the end, tension between Thurstan and his monks reached such a pitch that he sent his men-at-arms to enforce his will. The monks took refuge in the choir of the church and tried to prevent Thurstan's men from following them. The Anglo-Saxon Chronicle describes in unusual detail what happened next:

The Frenchmen broke into the choir and threw missiles towards the altar where the monks were, and some of the knights went to the upper storey and shot arrows down towards the shrine, so that many arrows stuck in the cross that stood above the altar: and the wretched monks were lying round the altar, and some crept under it, and cried to God zealously, asking for His mercy when they could get no mercy from men. What can we say, except that they shot fiercely, and the others broke down the doors there, and went in and killed some of the monks and wounded many there in the church, so that the blood came from the altar on to the steps, and from the steps on to the floor. Three were killed there and eighteen wounded.

John of Worcester gives different figures, reporting fourteen monks wounded and two dead, but adds that some of the men-at-arms were injured, the monks having used stools and candlesticks in self-defence. This incident was considered so shocking that the king himself stepped in. He instituted a judicial enquiry which condemned Thurstan while also assigning some blame to the monks. Thurstan was sent back to Normandy, though not actually deposed from his abbacy, and some of the surviving monks were transferred to other abbeys.

== Later career ==
Thurstan is nevertheless known to have been in Wiltshire in 1086, and after the death of William the Conqueror he bought from his successor, William Rufus, for £500, the right to live in England. He apparently did not return to Glastonbury, where he was still officially abbot, but charter evidence shows him to have been with the royal court at various dates up to 1096. During these years, Glastonbury Abbey acquired the bones of St Benignus. Thurstan is recorded to have died on 1 March, though in what year is unknown. Certainly he must have been dead by 1100, when his successor Herluin was consecrated as abbot of Glastonbury.
