= Ælfric Puttoc =

Archbishop of York from 1023 to 1051

- Archbishop of York
- Appointed: 1023
- Term ended: 1051
- Predecessor: Wulfstan
- Successor: Cynesige

Orders
- Consecration: 1023 by Æthelnoth

Personal details
- Born: Ælfric
- Died: 22 January 1051 Southwell, Nottinghamshire
- Buried: Peterborough Cathedral

Ælfric Puttoc (Note: Pronounced /ˈælfrɪk ˈpʌtək/; Old English: Ælfrīc Puttoc. Sometimes modernised as Alfric Puttock.) (died 22 January 1051) was Archbishop of York from 1023 to his death, and briefly Bishop of Worcester from 1040 to 1041. He may have crowned Harold Harefoot in 1036, and certainly assisted in that king's disinterment in 1040 and at the coronation of Edward the Confessor in 1043. He founded houses of canons and encouraged the cult of John of Beverley.

== Early career ==
Ælfric first appears in the historical record as the provost of New Minster, Winchester. He was probably a native of Wessex. He became Archbishop of York in 1023, but did not hold the see of Worcester at the same time, which had been traditional for a number of years. He was consecrated by Æthelnoth, the Archbishop of Canterbury.

Ælfric travelled to Rome in 1026 to receive his pallium from Pope John XIX. He was the first archbishop of York to travel to Rome for their pallium, all other palliums held by the archbishops previous to this had been sent to York. During King Cnut of England's reign, Ælfric received the manor of Patrington in Holderness from the king and his wife Emma of Normandy. In 1036 he may have been the bishop who crowned Harold Harefoot king of England, since the Archbishop of Canterbury of the time was Æthelnoth, who supported Harold's rival Harthacnut.

== Archbishop ==
However, when Harthacnut became king, Ælfric became a supporter of Harthacnut. During Harthacnut's reign, Ælfric was sent with others to disinter Harold's body and throw it away. In 1040, Lyfing, Bishop of Worcester, was accused of taking part in the murder of Alfred, and Ælfric used the temporary disgrace of Lyfing to acquire his see. In fact, the chronicler John of Worcester relates the story that it was Ælfric himself who accused Lyfing of being involved in Alfred's murder, although whether to curry favour with the new king Harthacnut or to acquire Worcester is unclear. Ælfric was deprived of his Worcester see in 1041, and Lyfing was reinstated.

Ælfric's main political activities took place during Harthacnut's reign, although he attested charters of Cnut, Harold Harefoot, and Edward the Confessor also.

Ælfric translated the relics of John of Beverley into a new shrine at Beverley in 1037, and worked to foster the cult of that saint by providing new buildings and giving endowments to the church. An oddity of his time as archbishop was that instead of the normal descriptor archiepiscopus on charters, Ælfric used archipraesul instead. He continued the work of his predecessor in founding houses of canons in his archdiocese. A late medieval source recorded by the early modern antiquarian John Leland claims that Ælfric created the offices of sacristan, chancellor, and precentor at Beverley.

Ælfric officiated with Archbishop Edsige of Canterbury at the coronation of Edward the Confessor at Winchester on 3 April 1043.

== Death and legacy ==
Ælfric died at Southwell on 22 January 1051 and is buried in Peterborough Cathedral. While the later medieval chronicler William of Malmesbury felt that Ælfric deserved rebuke, the Anglo-Saxon Chronicle called him "very venerable and wise". Ælfric left his vestments and altar to Peterborough Abbey.

Ælfric's nickname, or byname, "Puttoc" probably means "kite" (the type of bird; confer Old English pyttel, "kite; little hawk"), and may have been an invention by the monks of Worcester to belittle Ælfric. It may have meant "buzzard" also. It never occurs without the Ælfric, so it is unlikely to have been a true second name. The Northumbrian Priests' Law which is usually attributed to Ælfric's predecessor Wulfstan II, Archbishop of York, might have been authored instead by Ælfric, or possibly Ælfric's successor Cynesige.

== Citations ==
Christian titles
Preceded by Wulfstan	Archbishop of York; 1023–1041	Succeeded by Æthelric
Preceded by Lyfing	Bishop of Worcester; 1040–1041	Succeeded by Lyfing
Preceded by Æthelric	Archbishop of York; 1042–1051	Succeeded by Cynesige
