= Grimketel =

11th-century Bishop of Selsey

- Bishop of Selsey
- Appointed: c. 1039
- Term ended: 1047
- Predecessor: Æthelric I
- Successor: Heca

Personal details
- Died: 1047 (Note: The Anglo-Saxon Chronicle versions C and D suggests that Grimketel died in 1047, version E says 1045, and version F says 1046)
- Buried: Christ Church Priory Canterbury
- Denomination: Christian

Grimketel (Note: Or Grimcytel; known as Grimkell or Grimkjell in Scandinavian texts and Grimcillus in Latin.) (died 1047) was an English clergyman (Note: Some texts suggest that Grimketel was a Danish name and thus he would have been Danish. It is also possible that he may have been a monk.) who went to Norway as a missionary and was partly responsible for the conversion of Norway to Christianity. He initiated the beatification of Saint Olaf. (Note: Grimketel initiated the beatification of Olaf on 3 August 1031. This was before the time of the formal canonization process now in use.) On his return to England he became Bishop of Selsey and also for a time Bishop of Elmham. He was accused, by some, of being guilty of simony.

== Life ==
Little is known of Grimketel's background.

According to Icelandic sagas, the Norwegian King Olaf Haraldson spent a year in England supporting Æthelred the Unready in driving out the Danish King Cnut. While in England Olaf was in contact with many Christians who seemed to have influenced him into converting to Christianity. Olaf was baptised at Notre-Dame, Rouen in 1012. When Olaf returned to Norway, with the intention of restoring power to his family, he took a group of English priests and advisors with him. One of his principle advisors was Grimketel. Olaf became King of Norway and Grimketel became the Bishop of Nidaros. (Note: Nidaros is modern day Trondheim)

Olaf and Grimketel proclaimed the earliest Norwegian church laws in about 1020 at the Moster þing. The structure of the law, devised by Grimketel, was similar to that of the laws in England at the time.

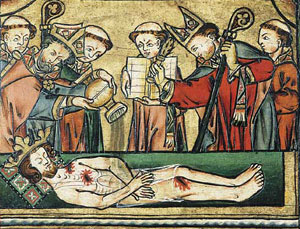
Panel from Nidaros Cathedral showing Grimketel exhuming the body of Olaf and declaring him a saint.

In 1028 an alliance of Olaf's countrymen and Cnut drove Olaf into exile. Cnut installed his son Swein as ruler with his mother Ælfgifu of Northampton. Sigurd was installed as Bishop of Nidaros, in Grimketel's place. Then in 1030, Olaf returned from exile, and was killed by his country men at the Battle of Stiklestad while trying to reclaim his kingdom. However, after about a year the people of Norway rejected Swein and installed Olaf's son as king. Grimketel was asked to go to Nidaros and officially declare the former king a saint.

Cnut is said to have brought Grimketel back to England. Grimketel then stayed at Canterbury until he was appointed Bishop of Selsey in late 1038 or in 1039. He was bishop of Selsey at the time Stigand was bishop of the see of Elmham. . (Note: The See of Elmham was also known as the See of East Anglia) Later authors claimed that Grimketel achieved the see of Selsey, as well as that of Elmham, through simony. (Note: John Ayliffe, in the 18th century, defined simony in canon law as " ..a deliberate act or a premeditated will and desire of selling such things as are spiritual, or of anything annexed unto spirituals, by giving something of a temporal nature for the purchase thereof; or in other terms it is defined to be a commutation of a thing spiritual or annexed unto spirituals by giving something that is temporal.") There was a simple reference to this episode in the earlier recension of the Worcester Chronicle, which, according to the historian Susan Kelly, was later elaborated with some unreliable detail; the revised version states that Grimketel bought the Elmham see (the words pro auro, "for gold" have been substituted for pro eo, "for him") and that Stigand became bishop of Selsey, which Kelly feels is not credible.

According to the Anglo-Saxon Chronicle versions C, D, and E, Ælfric II, Bishop of Elmham died about Christmas 1038, and William of Malmesbury says that he was replaced by another Ælfric (Ælfric III), however in his chronicle, Florence of Worcester ignored Ælfric III, and has Stigand becoming Bishop of Elmham instead. (Note: In his lists of bishops of Elmham, Florence does list the second Ælfric.) He then records that Grimketel replaced Stigand at Elmham, when the latter was deposed in 1043.

Grimketel's name was on two royal writs concerning Bury St Edmunds namely S. 1069 and S. 1070, that support his appointment as Bishop of Elmham. The first writ (S. 1069) is known to be authentic and is dated around 1043, the second writ is thought to be spurious. Grimketel was then in turn deposed when Stigand was restored in 1044. Susan Kelly says that it is not clear whether there is justification for the rumours identifying Grimketel as a simonist; however, the historian Frank Barlow feels that he did purchase the office from King Harold Harefoot.

Grimketel died in 1047 and was buried at Christ Church Priory, Canterbury.

== Citations ==
Christian titles
Preceded by Æthelric I	Bishop of Selsey c. 1039–1047	Succeeded by Heca
