= Heca =

11th-century Bishop of Selsey

- Bishop of Selsey
- Appointed: 1047
- Term ended: 1057
- Predecessor: Grimketel
- Successor: Æthelric II
- Other post: royal chaplain

Personal details
- Died: 1057
- Denomination: Christian

Hecca (or Heca; died 1057) was an Anglo-Saxon Bishop of Selsey. According to the Anglo-Saxon Chronicle, Hecca was chaplain to Edward the Confessor and became bishop when Grimketel died in 1047. (Note: There is variance on the date of Grimketels death and Hecas accession between the various versions of the Anglo-Saxon chronicle. The Anglo-Saxon Chronicle manuscript (MS) C suggests that Grimketel died in 1047. According to the Anglo-Saxon Chronicle MS E, MS F and MS D he could also have died in 1045, 1046 or 1047) He was an Englishman, and a royal clerk. He died in 1057. (Note: Anglo-Saxon Chronicle versions E and F give his date of death as 1058, the other manuscripts cite 1057.)

== Citations ==
Christian titles
Preceded by Grimketel	Bishop of Selsey; 1047–1057	Succeeded by Æthelric II
