= Seffrid I =

12th-century Bishop of Chichester

- Bishop of Chichester
- Appointed: c. February 1125
- Term ended: deposed 1145
- Predecessor: Ralph de Luffa
- Successor: Hilary of Chichester
- Other post: Abbot of Glastonbury

Orders
- Consecration: 12 April 1125 by William de Corbeil

Personal details
- Died: c. 1151
- Buried: possibly Glastonbury Abbey

Seffrid I, sometimes known as Seffrid Pelochin, was a medieval Bishop of Chichester.

== Life ==
Seffrid was the son of Seffrid d'Escures and Guimordis, and was a half brother to Ralph d'Escures, Archbishop of Canterbury from 1114 to 1122. He was a native of Escures, near Sées, and his father was a landowner and sworn man of Roger of Montgomery. He was a monk at Séez Abbey in Sées, France, and became abbot of Glastonbury Abbey in 1120. He acted as an emissary for King Henry I of England at the papal curia in Rome. In 1123 he went to Rome with Anselm of St Saba as part of William de Corbeil the newly elected Archbishop of Canterbury's party. William was traveling to Rome to secure his pallium. Seffrid was nominated to the see of Chichester about February 1125 and consecrated on 12 April 1125 by William de Corbeil, the Archbishop of Canterbury, at Lambeth. He was deprived of his see in 1145, and died sometime between 1150 and 1151. He was possibly deprived for homosexuality, and may have been buried at Glastonbury. Six genuine documents of his time as bishop survive, along with his profession of obedience. Four of these documents were grants to monasteries, one dealt with his cathedral chapter's canons, and the last is a grant of land.

== Citations ==
Catholic Church titles
Preceded by Ralph de Luffa	Bishop of Chichester; 1125–1145	Succeeded by Hilary of Chichester
