= Æthelric II =

11th-century Anglo-Saxon Bishop of Selsey

- Bishop of Selsey
- See: Diocese of Selsey
- Term ended: deposed 1070
- Predecessor: Heca
- Successor: Stigand

Orders
- Consecration: 1058

Personal details
- Died: c. 1076

Æthelric (Note: Called Æthelric II to distinguish him from an earlier Æthelric who was also bishop of Selsey and also spelled Ethelric.) (died c. 1076) was the second to last medieval Bishop of Selsey in England before the see was moved to Chichester. Consecrated a bishop in 1058, he was deposed in 1070 for unknown reasons and then imprisoned by King William I of England. He was considered one of the best legal experts of his time, and was even brought from his prison to attend the trial on Penenden Heath where he gave testimony about English law before the Norman Conquest of England.

== Early life ==
Æthelric was a monk at Christ Church Priory at Canterbury prior to his becoming a bishop. Several historians opine that he might have been the same as the Æthelric who was a monk of Canterbury and a relative of Godwin, Earl of Wessex. That Æthelric was elected by the monks of Canterbury to be Archbishop of Canterbury in 1050, but was not confirmed by King Edward the Confessor who insisted on Robert of Jumièges becoming archbishop instead. The evidence is not merely that they shared the same name, because the name was a relatively common one in Anglo-Saxon England. Other evidence pointing to the possibility of them being the same person includes the fact that he was felt to have been unfairly deposed in 1070, as well as the bishop's great age in 1076.

Æthelric was consecrated bishop in 1058 by Stigand, the Archbishop of Canterbury. Æthelric was consecrated by Stigand, unlike most of the English bishops of the time period, because at that point, Stigand held a valid pallium, or symbol of an archbishop's authority and ability to consecrate bishops.

== Deposition ==
Æthelric was deposed by the Council of Windsor on 24 May 1070 and imprisoned at Marlborough, being replaced by Stigand (not the same as the archbishop), who later moved the seat of the diocese to Chichester. It is possible that his deposition was tied to the fact that about that time, King Harold of England's mother and sister took refuge with the count of Flanders. If Æthelric was related to the Godwins, King William I of England may have feared that the bishop would use his diocese to launch a rebellion. Other reasons put forward include the fact that Æthelric had been consecrated by Stigand, but the other bishop that Stigand had consecrated, Siward the Bishop of Rochester was not deposed. Æthelric was a monk, and while not having a great reputation for sanctity, he was not held to be immoral either. The pope did not feel that his deposition had been handled correctly, so his deposition was confirmed at the Council of Winchester on 1 April 1076. It continued to be considered uncanonical, but Æthelric was never restored to his bishopric.

== Penenden Heath ==
Æthelric was carted from imprisonment to the Trial of Penenden Heath of Odo of Bayeux, earl of Kent. This took place sometime between 1072 and 1076. (Note: For a discussion of the dating issues of the trial as well as other concerns connected to Æthelric's attendance at the trial, see a 2001 article by Alan Cooper in The English Historical Review, that is listed in the further reading section.) At that time, he was the most prominent legalist in England. He helped clarify Anglo-Saxon land laws, as the trial was concerned with the attempts of Lanfranc to recover lands from Odo. The medieval writer Eadmer also consulted Æthelric for information on Eadmer's Life of St Dunstan.

Presumably Æthelric died soon after the trial, as he was already an old man when he attended the trial.

== Citations ==
Catholic Church titles
Preceded by Heca	Bishop of Selsey; 1058–1070	Succeeded by Stigand
