= Robert the Lotharingian =

Priest in England (died 1095)

- Bishop of Hereford
- Appointed: before 29 December 1079
- Term ended: 26 June 1095
- Predecessor: Walter
- Successor: Gerard
- Previous post: probably a canon of Liège

Orders
- Ordination: before 29 December 1079 by Wulfstan, Bishop of Worcester
- Consecration: 29 December 1079 by Lanfranc, Archbishop of Canterbury

Personal details
- Died: 26 June 1095
- Buried: Hereford Cathedral
- Denomination: Roman Catholic Church

Robert the Lotharingian (Note: Also known as Robert de Losinga and Robert of Lorraine. Another man called Robert de Losinga was abbot of New Minster, Winchester and father of Herbert de Losinga, Bishop of Norwich.) (died 26 June 1095) was a priest who became Bishop of Hereford following the Norman Conquest of England. His writings serve as one of the best sources for information on the process of compiling the Domesday Book, and he may have introduced the abacus to England.

== Life ==
Robert was a native of Lorraine and probably a canon of St. Lambert's Cathedral, Liège before coming to England, and may have been educated at the cathedral school there also. The school at Liege specialized in mathematics, which later became a specialty of Robert's. His name is often given as Robert de Losinga, but the earliest evidence gives it as Robert the Lotharingian. His birthdate is unknown, but it was probably before 1049.

Robert may have arrived in England by the 1050s, or perhaps after the Norman Conquest. Arguments have been presented on both sides. King William the Conqueror's appointment of Robert was somewhat unusual, not just because he was not a Norman, but because he was not a religious scholar, and was instead an astronomer and mathematician. Robert was ordained as a priest by Wulfstan, Bishop of Worcester sometime before 29 December 1079. Robert was consecrated as the Bishop of Hereford by Lanfranc on 29 December 1079 at Canterbury.

Robert brought the chronicle of Marianus Scotus to England, but it had little effect on historical writing in England, beyond the use that Florence of Worcester made of it. Robert inserted into his own copy of Marianus, a notice about the Domesday Book survey, that is one of the best sources for information on the process of Domesday. His only other work that survives is a small introduction to Marianus' chronicle that corrects a few errors and discusses computation. He was also known as a mathematician and astrologer, and brought continental learning into his diocese. He was also familiar with the abacus, and some historians feel he helped introduce it into England. Others, though, disagree and feel that the use of the abacus was known before this time in England. He was good friends with Wulfstan, Bishop of Worcester, and it was Robert who buried the future saint. It may be that Robert gave Wulfstan a copy of Marianus' chronicle, which allowed the monks at Worcester to use it in their own works. Robert was also friends with Osmund, who was Bishop of Salisbury.

Robert was present at the Council of Rockingham in February 1095, which dealt with the conflict between King William II of England and Anselm, the Archbishop of Canterbury. Robert sided with the king against the archbishop. Afterwards, however, Robert and Osmund, the Bishop of Salisbury, were reconciled with Anselm.

Robert died on 26 June 1095. He was buried in Hereford Cathedral. He built a chapel at Hereford Cathedral, basing it on the church at Aachen. This was a two-tier chapel of a type reserved for royalty or archbishops in Germany. He also improved the financial condition of his diocese, although it remained poor.

== Citations ==
Catholic Church titles
Preceded by Walter	Bishop of Hereford; 1079–1095	Succeeded by Gerard
