= Wulfstan (died 1095) =

11th-century Bishop of Worcester and saint

Saint Wulfstan
- Bishop of Worcester
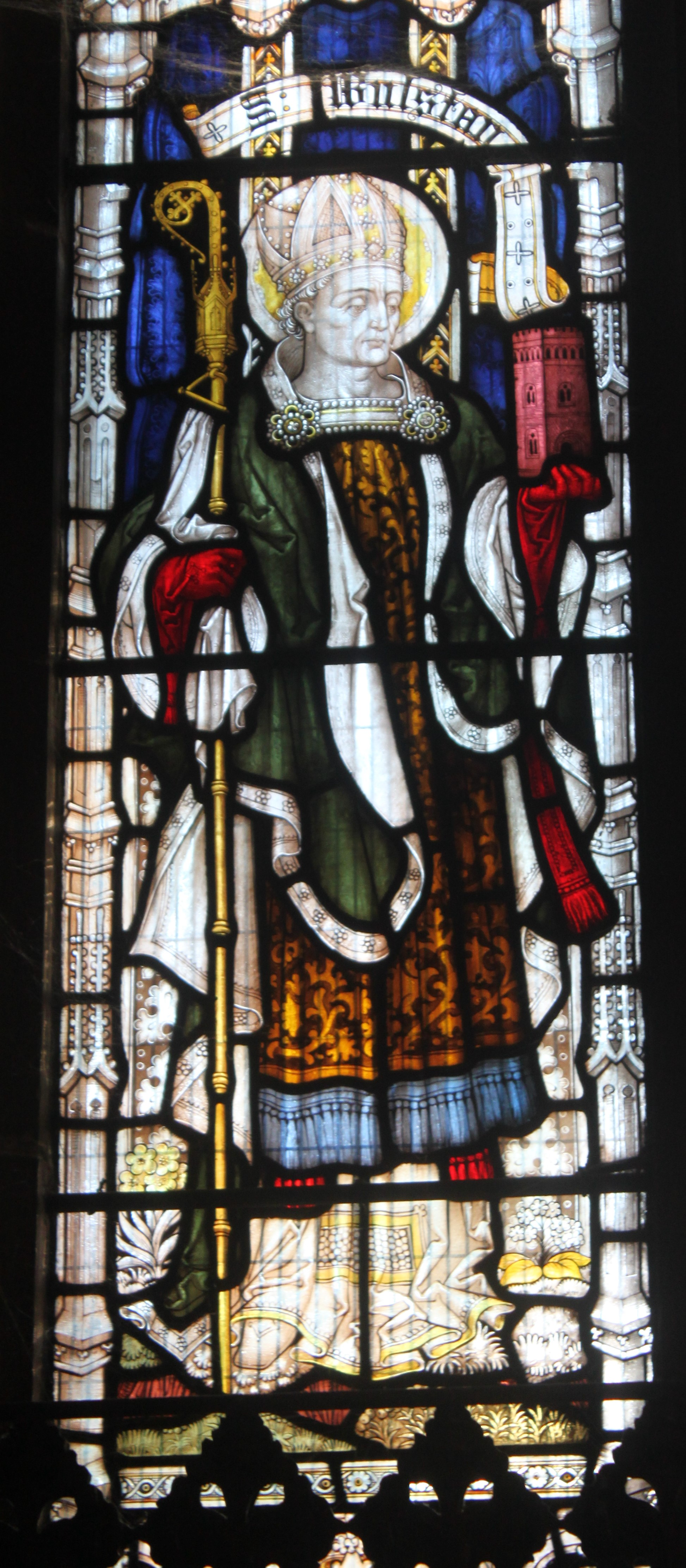
- Stained glass depicting Wulfstan in the Church of St John in Bedwardine, St John's, Worcester
- Appointed: 1062
- Term ended: 20 January 1095
- Predecessor: Ealdred
- Successor: Samson
- Other post: Prior of Worcester

Orders
- Consecration: 8 September 1062 by Ealdred

Personal details
- Born: c. 1008 Long Itchington, Warwickshire, Kingdom of England
- Died: 20 January 1095 (aged around 86) Worcester, Worcestershire, Kingdom of England
- Denomination: Catholic

Sainthood
- Feast day: 19 January
- Venerated in: Catholic Church; Anglican Communion
- Canonized: 14 May 1203 by Pope Innocent III
- Attributes: Bishop
- Patronage: Peasants, vegetarians and dieters
- Shrines: Worcester Cathedral (destroyed)

Wulfstan (c. 1008 – 20 January 1095) was an English Benedictine monk who served as Bishop of Worcester from 1062 to 1095. (Note: Sometimes Wulfstan II, also known as Wolstan, Wulstan and Ulfstan) He was the last surviving pre-Norman Conquest bishop. Wulfstan is revered as a saint in the Catholic and Anglican churches.

== Denomination ==
His denomination as Wulfstan II is to indicate that he is the second Bishop Wulfstan of Worcester. This, however, does not prevent confusion, since the first Bishop Wulfstan – his maternal uncle – is also called Wulfstan II to denote that he was the second Archbishop of York called Wulfstan.

== Life ==
Wulfstan was born about 1008 at Long Itchington in the English county of Warwickshire. His family lost their lands around the time King Cnut of England came to the throne in 1016. He was probably named after his uncle, Wulfstan II, Archbishop of York. Through his uncle's influence, he studied at monasteries in Evesham and Peterborough, before becoming a clerk at Worcester. During this time, his superiors, noting his reputation for dedication and chastity, urged him to join the priesthood. In 1034 Wulfstan served as incumbent at St Mary's Church in Hawkesbury, Gloucestershire. Whilst at his devotions he was distracted by the smell of a goose cooking in the kitchen nearby. Mortified, he resolved never to touch meat again and became a vegetarian. Wulfstan was ordained shortly thereafter, in 1038, and soon joined a monastery of Benedictines at Worcester.

Wulfstan served as treasurer and prior of Worcester, and from 1034 onwards served as the parish priest of Hawkesbury, Gloucestershire. When Ealdred, the bishop of Worcester as well as the Archbishop of York, was required to relinquish Worcester by Pope Nicholas, Ealdred decided to have Wulfstan appointed to Worcester. In addition, Ealdred continued to hold a number of the manors of the diocese. Wulfstan was consecrated Bishop of Worcester on 8 September 1062, by Ealdred. It would have been more proper for him to have been consecrated by the Archbishop of Canterbury, whose province Worcester was in. Wulfstan had deliberately avoided consecration by the current archbishop of Canterbury, Stigand, since Stigand's own consecration had been uncanonical. Wulfstan still acknowledged that the see of Worcester was a suffragan of Canterbury. He made no profession of obedience to Ealdred, instead offering a profession of obedience to Stigand's successor Lanfranc.

Wulfstan was a confidant of Harold Godwinson, who helped secure the bishopric for him.

A social reformer, Wulfstan struggled to bridge the gap between the old and new regimes, and to alleviate the suffering of the poor. He was a strong opponent of the slave trade, and together with Lanfranc, was mainly responsible for ending the trade from Bristol.

After the Norman conquest of England, Wulfstan was the only English-born bishop to retain his diocese for any significant time after the Conquest (all others had been replaced or succeeded by Normans by 1075). William of Malmesbury, whose early 12th century work Vita Wulfstani provides much of our knowledge of the bishop, noted that pastoral care of his diocese was Wulfstan's principal interest.

In 1072 Wulfstan signed the Accord of Winchester. In 1075, Wulfstan and the Worcestershire fyrd militia countered the Revolt of the Earls, when various magnates attempted a rebellion against William the Conqueror.

Wulfstan founded the Great Malvern Priory, and undertook much large-scale rebuilding work, including Worcester Cathedral, Hereford Cathedral, Tewkesbury Abbey, and many other churches in the Worcester, Hereford and Gloucester areas. He famously wept upon the destruction of the old Worcester Cathedral to make way for the new Romanesque building, decrying the loss of a building in which "so many holy and devout men have served God". After the Norman Conquest, he claimed that the Oswaldslow, a "triple hundred" administered by the bishops of Worcester, was free of interference by the local sheriff. This right to exclude the sheriff was recorded in the Domesday Book in 1086. Wulfstan also administered the diocese of Lichfield when it was vacant between 1071 and 1072.

As bishop, he often assisted the archbishops of York with consecrations, as they had few suffragan bishops. In 1073 Wulfstan helped Thomas of Bayeux consecrate Radulf as Bishop of Orkney, and in 1081 helped consecrate William de St-Calais as Bishop of Durham.

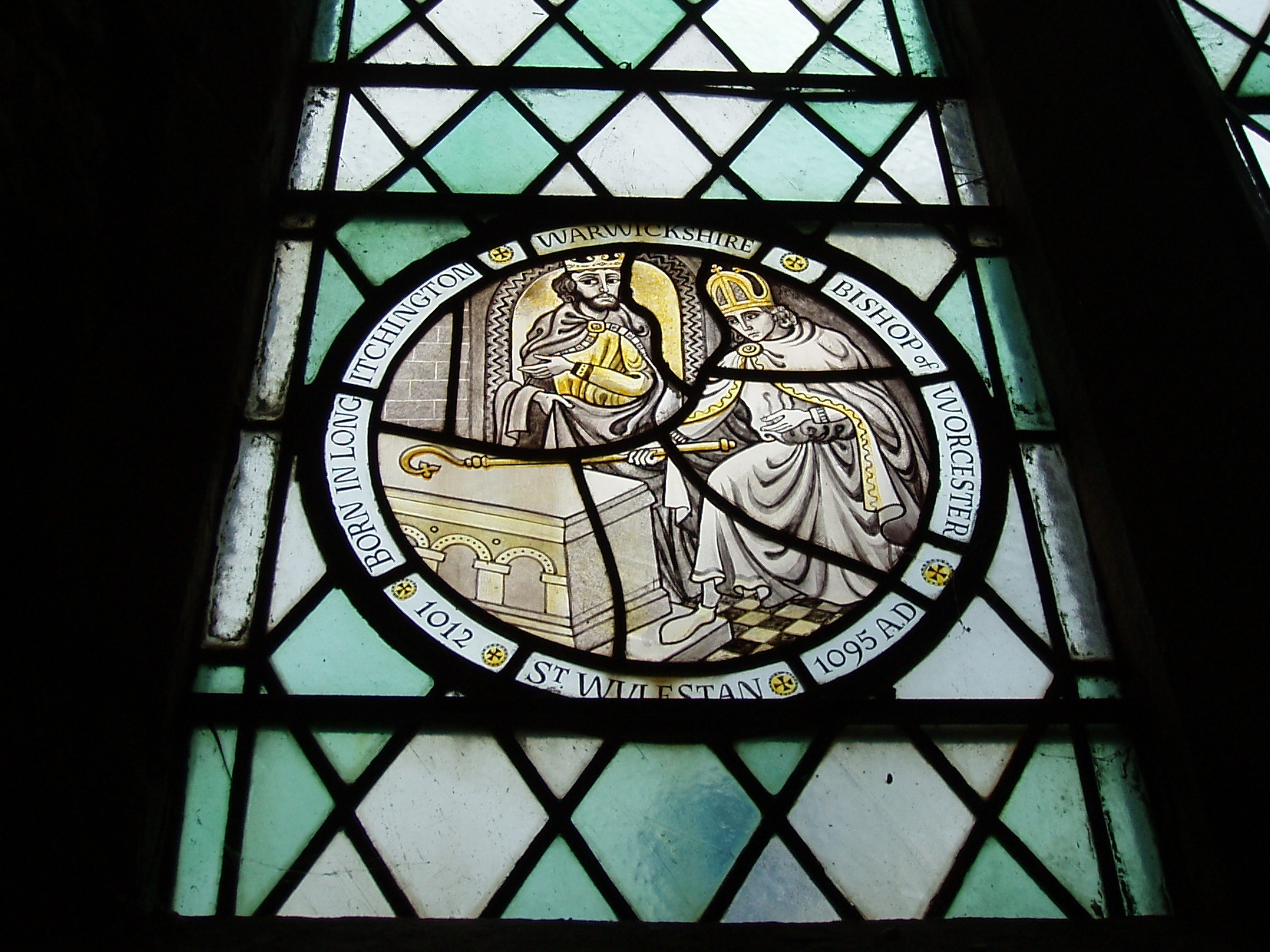
Stained glass depicting Wulfstan at the church of the Holy Trinity, Long Itchington

Wulfstan was responsible for the compilation by Hemming of the second cartulary of Worcester. He was close friends with Robert Losinga, the Bishop of Hereford, who was well known as a mathematician and astronomer.

Wulfstan, the last surviving pre-Conquest bishop, died 20 January 1095 after a protracted illness, whilst washing the feet of parishioners as was his custom. After his death, an altar was dedicated to him in Great Malvern Priory, next to those of Thomas Cantilupe and King Edward the Confessor.

== Legacy ==
At Easter of 1158, Henry II and his wife Eleanor of Aquitaine visited Worcester Cathedral and placed their crowns on the shrine of Wulfstan, vowing not to wear them again. Their son King John is buried at Worcester Cathedral.

Soon after Wulfstan's death, a hagiography, or saint's life, was written about him in English by his former chancellor Colman. It was translated into Latin by the medieval chronicler and historian William of Malmesbury. Wulfstan was canonized on 14 May 1203 by Pope Innocent III. He became the Patron Saint of Peasants and Vegetarians. One of the miracles attributed to Wulfstan was the curing of King Harold's daughter. The recently founded Victorine priory in Celbridge, Ireland (paid for by Adam de Hereford) was named St. Wolstan's Priory in his honour.

In 2008, the millennial anniversary of Wulfstan's birth, the Friends of the Church of St Mary the Virgin, Hawkesbury, where Wulfstan served from 1034, commissioned a stained glass window to his memory. The commission was carried out by a local artist, Caroline Pederick and it was dedicated in 2011 by Bishop Michael Pelham of Gloucester. In three roundels, it depicts features from Wulfstan's life; the broken chains of slavery, the goose, many vegetables and the bishop's crosier and mitre. In 2021, St. Mary's Church installed a ring of eight bells in their tower. The largest bell, weighing 600 kg, is named in honour of Wulfstan.

Wulfstan is remembered in the Church of England with a lesser festival, and on the Episcopal Church calendar on 19 January.

In 2023, a pastoral area of the Catholic Diocese of Clifton was named in honour of Wulfstan.

== Citations ==
Catholic Church titles
Preceded by Ealdred	Bishop of Worcester; 1062–1095	Succeeded by Samson
