= Norðhymbra preosta lagu =

Medieval English law code

Norðhymbra preosta lagu ('the Northumbrian priests' law') is an Anglo-Saxon legal text written in Old English found in the manuscript Cambridge, Corpus Christi College, MS 201, pp. 43–46 (which otherwise includes homilies and laws by Archbishop Wulfstan of York). In the summary of the Early English Laws project, "the law deals with offences committed against priests or churches, punishments for heathen practices, non-observance of Sundays, festivals and fasts, or for withholding church dues. The text post-dates 1023 and draws on legislation from the reigns" of Æthelred the Unready and Cnut the Great.

== Topics ==
=== Suppression of heathenry ===
The laws asserts that all are to hold to one Christianity and to renounce all heathenry. It sets out punishments for what it deems heathen practices such as a fine of five half-marks to the Church and five to the king for the holding of blót, fyrt or "idol worship". It further forbids the making of frið-geardas (sometimes glossed as "sanctuaries") around a stone, tree or well, with the punishment being a fine paid to the landowner and the Church. That the compensation to the landowner has been interpreted as meaning that during the time in which the laws were written, frið-geardas were typically made in secret by those of low social status. They have been further connected with similar prohibitions in Canons of Edgar, written by Archbishop Wulfstan of York in the 11th century.

== Editions ==
- Liebermann, F. (ed.), Die Gesetze der Angelsachsen, 3 vols (Halle a. S.: Niemeyer, 1903–16), I 380–85

== See also ==
- Germanic law
- Medieval Scandinavian law

== Bibliography ==
=== Primary ===
- Thorpe, Benjamin (2012). "Law of the Northumbrian priests". Ancient Laws and Institutes of England. Cambridge University Press. pp. 290–303. ISBN 9781139177412.

=== Secondary ===
- Meaney, Audrey L. (January 2004). "'And we forbeodað eornostlice ælcne hæðenscipe': Wulfstan and Late Anglo-Saxon and Norse 'Heathenism'". Wulfstan, Archbishop of York. Studies in the Early Middle Ages. 10. Brepols Publishers: 461–500. doi:10.1484/m.sem-eb.3.3720. ISBN 978-2-503-52224-1.
