= Stigand =

Archbishop of Canterbury from 1052 to 1070

- Archbishop of Canterbury
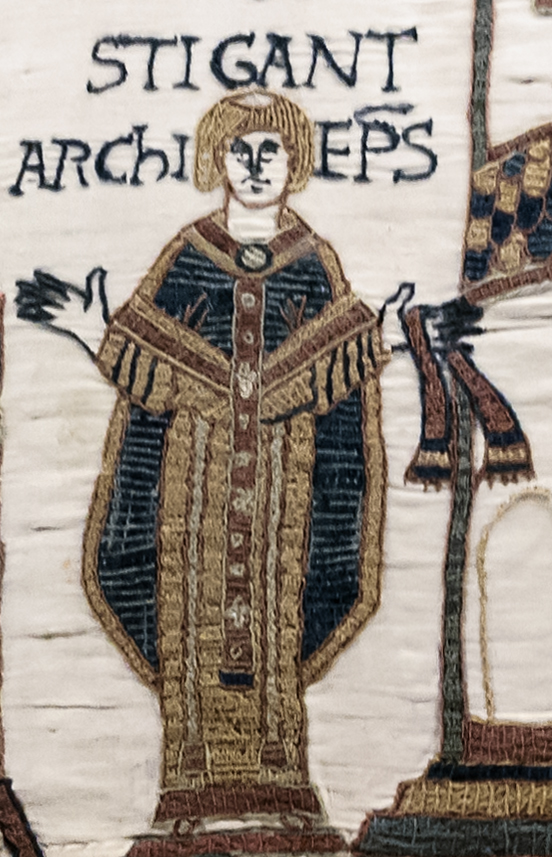
- Stigand from the Bayeux Tapestry
- Appointed: 1052
- Term ended: 11 April 1070
- Predecessor: Robert of Jumièges
- Successor: Lanfranc
- Other posts: Bishop of Elmham; Bishop of Winchester

Orders
- Consecration: 1043

Personal details
- Born: Stigand
- Died: 1072, probably 21 or 22 February
- Buried: Old Minster, Winchester

Stigand (Note: Latin: Stigantus) (died 1072) was an Anglo-Saxon churchman in pre-Norman Conquest England who became Archbishop of Canterbury. His birth date is unknown, but by 1020, he was serving as a royal chaplain and advisor. He was named Bishop of Elmham in 1043, and was later Bishop of Winchester and Archbishop of Canterbury. Stigand was an advisor to several members of the Anglo-Saxon and Norman English royal dynasties, serving six successive kings. Excommunicated by several popes for his pluralism in holding the two sees, or bishoprics, of Winchester and Canterbury concurrently, he was finally deposed in 1070, and his estates and personal wealth were confiscated by William the Conqueror. Stigand was imprisoned at Winchester, where he died.

Stigand served King Cnut as a chaplain at a royal foundation at Ashingdon in 1020 and as an advisor thereafter. He continued in his role of advisor during the reigns of Cnut's sons, Harold Harefoot and Harthacnut. When Cnut's stepson Edward the Confessor succeeded Harthacnut, Stigand in all probability became England's main administrator. Monastic writers of the time accused Stigand of extorting money and lands from the church, and by 1066, the only estates richer than Stigand's were the royal estates and those of Harold Godwinson.

In 1043, Edward appointed Stigand to the see of Elmham. Four years later, he was appointed to the see of Winchester, and then in 1052 to the archdiocese of Canterbury, which Stigand held jointly with Winchester. It was later claimed that five successive popes, including Nicholas II and Alexander II, excommunicated Stigand for holding both Winchester and Canterbury, but there is no evidence for this. Stigand was present at the deathbed of King Edward and at the coronation of Harold Godwinson as king of England in 1066. After Harold's death, Stigand submitted to William the Conqueror. On Christmas Day 1066 Ealdred, the Archbishop of York, crowned William King of England. Stigand's excommunication meant that he could only assist at the coronation.

Despite growing pressure for his deposition, Stigand continued to attend the royal court and to consecrate bishops until, in 1070, he was deposed by papal legates and imprisoned at Winchester. His intransigence toward the papacy was used as propaganda by Norman advocates who argued that the English church was backward and needed reform.

== Early life ==
Neither the year nor the date of Stigand's birth is known. (Note: The canonical age for ordination as a priest was 30, which would mean that he was born by 990, but dispensations allowing for ordination before the required age were common. If Stigand had been born by 990, he would have been at least 82 at his death, a remarkable age for his time. No chronicler or other source mentions Stigand being of a great age, which argues against his being born before 990.) He was born in East Anglia, possibly in Norwich, to an apparently prosperous family of mixed English and Scandinavian ancestry, as is shown by the fact that Stigand's name was Norse but his brother's was English. (Note: Stigand derives from "Stigandr", meaning either "he who goes by long strides" or "the swift footed one".) His brother Æthelmær, also a cleric, later succeeded Stigand as bishop of Elmham. His sister held land in Norwich, but her given name is unrecorded.

Stigand first appears in the historical record in 1020 as a royal chaplain to King Cnut of England (reigned 1016–1035). In that year he was appointed to Cnut's church at Ashingdon, or Assandun, which was dedicated by the reforming bishop Wulfstan of York. (Note: The church was dedicated to the memory of the dead of the Battle of Assandun in 1016. It is not known whether Stigand was the first priest appointed to the church.) Little is known of Stigand's life during Cnut's reign, but he must have had a place at the royal court, as he witnessed occasional charters. Following Cnut's death, Stigand successively served Cnut's sons, Harold Harefoot (reigned 1035–1040) and Harthacnut (reigned 1040–1042). After Harthacnut died Stigand became an advisor to Emma of Normandy, Cnut's widow and the mother of Harthacnut and his successor Edward the Confessor. (Note: Harold Harefoot and Harthacnut were half-brothers, both being sons of Cnut, but by different mothers – Harold's was Ælfgifu, Harthacnut's was Emma of Normandy. Harthacnut and Edward the Confessor were half-brothers, both being sons of Emma of Normandy, by different fathers – Harthacnut's being Cnut and Edward's being Æthelred the Unready, the king whom Cnut had overthrown. Thus, while Harthacnut was related to both his predecessor and successor, Harold Harefoot and Edward were not closely related.) He may have been Emma's chaplain, and it is possible that Stigand was already one of her advisors while Cnut was alive, and that he owed his position at Ashingdon to Emma's influence and favour. Because little is known of Stigand's activities before his appointment as a bishop, it is difficult to determine to whom he owed his position.

== Bishop of Elmham and Winchester ==
Stigand was appointed to the see of Elmham shortly after Edward the Confessor's coronation on 3 April 1043, probably on Emma's advice. This was the first episcopal appointment of Edward's reign. The diocese of Elmham covered East Anglia in eastern England, and was one of the poorer episcopal sees at that time. (Note: It was so poor that later, under successive bishops, the seat of the bishopric was moved first to Thetford, and then to Norwich.) He was consecrated bishop in 1043, but later that year Edward deposed Stigand and deprived him of his wealth. (Note: According to later texts, Elmham was briefly passed to Grimketel who was also Bishop of Selsey, at the time, and thus guilty of simony.) During the next year, however, Edward returned Stigand to office. The reasons for the deposition are unknown, but it was probably connected to the simultaneous fall from power of the dowager queen, Emma. Some sources state that Emma had invited King Magnus I of Norway, a rival claimant to the English throne, to invade England and had offered her personal wealth to aid Magnus. (Note: Magnus was the son of St. Olaf of Norway, and his claim to the English throne came from a treaty Harthacnut and Magnus signed around 1038 that provided that if either of the two should die without heirs, the other would inherit their kingdom.) Some suspected that Stigand had urged Emma to support Magnus, and claimed that his deposition was because of this. Contributing factors in Emma and Stigand's fall included Emma's wealth and dislike of her political influence, which was linked to the reign of the unpopular Harthacnut.

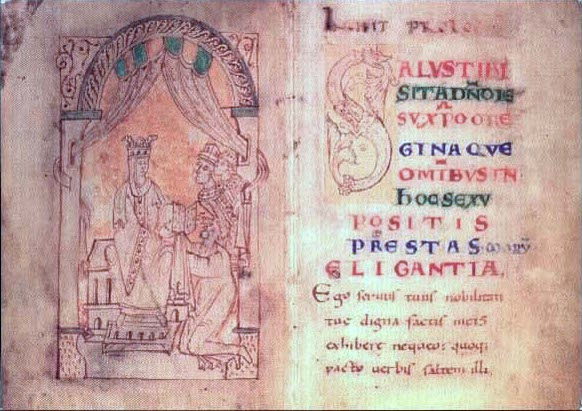
Emma of Normandy, seated with sons Harthacnut and Edward the Confessor, in this manuscript copy of the Encomium Emmae Reginae from about 1042

By 1046, Stigand had begun to witness charters of Edward the Confessor, showing that he was once again in royal favour. In 1047 Stigand was translated to the see of Winchester, but he retained Elmham until 1052. He may have owed the preferment to Earl Godwin of Wessex, the father-in-law of King Edward, although that is disputed by some historians. Emma, who had retired to Winchester after regaining Edward's favour, may also have influenced the appointment, either alone or in concert with Godwin. After his appointment to Winchester, Stigand was a witness to all the surviving charters of King Edward during the period 1047 to 1052.

Some historians, such as Frank Barlow and Emma Mason, state that Stigand supported Earl Godwin in his quarrel with Edward the Confessor in 1051–1052; others, including Ian Walker, hold that he was neutral. Stigand, whether or not he was a supporter of Godwin's, did not go into exile with the earl. The quarrel started over a fight between Eustace of Boulogne, brother-in-law of the king, and men of the town of Dover. The king ordered Godwin to punish the town, and the earl refused. Continued pressure from Edward undermined Godwin's position, and the earl and his family fled England in 1051. The earl returned in 1052 with a substantial armed force but eventually reached a peaceful accord with the king. Some medieval sources state that Stigand took part in the negotiations that reached a peace between the king and his earl; the Canterbury manuscript of the Anglo-Saxon Chronicle calls Stigand the king's chaplain and advisor during the negotiations.

== Archbishop of Canterbury ==
=== Appointment to Canterbury and issues with the papacy ===
The Archbishopric of Canterbury became drawn into the conflict between Edward and Godwin. Pope Leo IX was beginning a reform movement later known as the Gregorian Reform. Leo first focused on improving the clergy and prohibiting simony – the buying and selling of clerical and ecclesiastical offices. In 1049 Leo IX publicly pronounced that he would take more interest in English church matters and would investigate episcopal candidates more strictly before confirming them. When Archbishop Edsige of Canterbury died in 1051 the monks of the cathedral chapter elected Æthelric, a relative of Earl Godwin's, as archbishop. King Edward opposed the election and instead appointed Robert of Jumièges, who was Norman and already Bishop of London. Besides furthering Edward's quarrel with Godwin, the appointment signalled there were limits to Edward's willingness to compromise on ecclesiastical reform.

Although not known as a reformer before his appointment, Robert returned in 1051 from Rome, where he had gone to be confirmed by the papacy, and opposed the king's choice for Bishop of London on the grounds that the candidate was not suitable. Robert's attempts to recover church property appropriated by Earl Godwin contributed to the quarrel between the earl and the king. When Godwin returned to England in 1052, Robert was outlawed and exiled, following which King Edward appointed Stigand to the archbishopric. The appointment was either a reward from Godwin for Stigand's support during the conflict with Edward or a reward from King Edward for successfully negotiating a peaceful conclusion to the crisis in 1052. Stigand was the first non-monk to be appointed to either English archbishopric since before the days of Dunstan (archbishop from 959 to 988).

The papacy refused to recognise Stigand's elevation, as Robert was still alive and had not been deprived of office by a pope. Robert of Jumièges appealed to Leo IX, who summoned Stigand to Rome. When Stigand did not appear, he was excommunicated. Historian Nicholas Brooks holds the view that Stigand was not excommunicated at this time, but rather was ordered to refrain from any archiepiscopal functions, such as the consecration of bishops. He argues that in 1062 papal legates sat in council with Stigand, something they would not have done had he been excommunicated. The legates did nothing to alter Stigand's position either, although one of the legates later helped depose Stigand in 1070. However Pope Leo IX and his successors, Victor II and Stephen IX, continued to regard Stigand as uncanonically elected.

Stigand did not travel to Rome to receive a pallium, the band worn around the neck that is the symbol of an archbishop's authority, from the pope. Travelling to Rome for the pallium had become a custom, practised by a number of his predecessors. Instead, some medieval chroniclers state that he used Robert of Jumièges' pallium. It is not known if Stigand even petitioned the papacy for a pallium soon after his appointment. Owing to the reform movement, Stigand probably knew the request would be unsuccessful. In 1058, Antipope Benedict X, who opposed much of the reform movement, gave Stigand a pallium. However, Benedict was deposed the following year; the reforming party declared Benedict an antipope, and nullified all his acts, including Stigand's pallium grant. The exact circumstances that led to Benedict granting a pallium are unknown, whether it was at Stigand's request or was given without prompting.

After his translation to Canterbury, Stigand released Elmham to his brother Æthelmær but retained the bishopric of Winchester. Canterbury and Winchester were the two richest sees in England, and while precedent allowed the holding of a rich see along with a poor one, there was no precedent for holding two rich sees concurrently. He may have retained Winchester out of avarice, or his hold on Canterbury may not have been secure. Besides these, he held the abbey of Gloucester and the abbey of Ely and perhaps other abbeys also. Whatever his reasons, the retention of Winchester made Stigand a pluralist: the holder of more than one benefice at the same time. This was a practice that was targeted for elimination by the growing reform movement in the church. Five successive popes (Leo IX, Victor II, Stephen IX, Nicholas II, and Alexander II) excommunicated Stigand for holding both Winchester and Canterbury at the same time. It has been suggested by the historian Emma Mason that Edward refused to remove Stigand because this would have undermined the royal prerogative to appoint bishops and archbishops without papal input. Further hurting Stigand's position, Pope Nicholas II in 1061 declared pluralism to be uncanonical unless approved by the pope.

Stigand was later accused of simony by monastic chroniclers, but all such accusations date to after 1066, and are thus suspect owing to the post-Conquest desire to vilify the English Church as corrupt and backward. The medieval chronicler William of Poitiers also claimed that in 1052 Stigand agreed that William of Normandy, the future William the Conqueror, should succeed King Edward. This claim was used as propaganda after the Conquest, but according to the historian David Bates, among others, it is unlikely to be true. The position of Stigand as head of the church in England was used to good effect by the Normans in their propaganda before, during and after the Conquest.

=== Ecclesiastical affairs ===
The diocese of York took advantage of Stigand's difficulties with the papacy and encroached on the suffragans, or bishops owing obedience to an archbishop, normally subject to Canterbury. York had long been held in common with Worcester, but during the period when Stigand was excommunicated, the see of York also claimed oversight over the sees of Lichfield and Dorchester. In 1062 papal legates of Alexander II came to England. They did not depose Stigand, and even consulted with him and treated him as archbishop. He was allowed to attend the council they held and was an active participant with the legates in the business of the council.

Many of the bishops in England did not want to be consecrated by Stigand. Both Giso of Wells and Walter of Hereford travelled to Rome to be consecrated by the pope in 1061, rather than be consecrated by Stigand. During the brief period that he held a legitimate pallium, however, Stigand did consecrate Aethelric of Selsey and Siward of Rochester. Abbots of monasteries came to Stigand for consecration throughout his time as archbishop. These included not only abbots from monastic houses inside his province, such as Æthelsige as abbot of St Augustine's Abbey in Canterbury, but also Baldwin as Abbot of Bury St. Edmunds and Thurstan as Abbot of Ely. After the Norman Conquest, Stigand was accused of selling the office of abbot, but no abbot was deposed for buying the office, so the charge is suspect.

Stigand was probably the most lavish clerical donor of his period, when great men gave to churches on an unprecedented scale. He was a benefactor to the Abbey of Ely, and gave large gold or silver crucifixes to Ely, St Augustine's Abbey in Canterbury, Bury St. Edmunds Abbey, and to his cathedral church at Winchester. The crucifixes given to Ely, Bury and Winchester all appear to have had about life-size figures of Christ with matching figures of the Virgin and John the Evangelist, as is recorded in the monastic histories, and were probably permanently mounted over the altar or elsewhere. These would have been made with thin sheets of precious metal over a wooden core. No comparably early rood crosses with the side figures of Mary and John seem to survive, though we have large painted wooden crucifixes like the German Gero Cross of around 980, and the Volto Santo of Lucca (renewed with a later figure) which is known to have inspired Leofstan, Abbot of Bury (d. 1065) to create a similar figure, perhaps covered in precious metal, on his return from a visit to Rome. (Note: No early large metal examples have survived, though for example Charlemagne is known to have had one in his chapel at Aachen. For further information on the evolution of the large crucifix, see Schiller, Iconography of Christian Art, Vol. I, pp. 140–149, ISBN 0-85331-270-2.) To Ely he gave gold and silver vessels for the altar, and a chasuble embroidered in gold "of such inestimable workmanship and worth, that none in the kingdom is considered richer or more valuable". Although it does not appear that Stigand ever travelled to Rome, there are indications that Stigand did go on pilgrimage. A 12th-century life of Saint Willibrord, written at the Abbey of Echternach in what is now Luxembourg, records that "to this place also came Stigand, the eminent archbishop of the English". In the work, Stigand is recorded as giving rich gifts to the abbey as well as relics of saints.

=== Advisor to the king ===
During Edward's reign, Stigand was an influential advisor at court and used his position to increase his own wealth as well as that of his friends and family. Contemporary valuations of the lands he controlled at the death of King Edward, as listed in Domesday Book, come to an annual income of about 2500 pounds. There is little evidence, however, that he enriched either Canterbury or Winchester. He also appointed his followers to sees within his diocese in 1058, having Siward named Bishop of Rochester and Æthelric installed as Bishop of Selsey. Between his holding of two sees and the appointment of his men to other sees in the southeast of England, Stigand was an important figure in defending the coastline against invasion.

Stigand may have been in charge of the royal administration. He may also have been behind the effort to locate Edward the Atheling and his brother Edmund after 1052, possibly to secure a more acceptable heir to King Edward. His landholdings were spread across ten counties, and in some of those counties, his lands were larger than the king's holdings. Although Norman propagandists claimed that as early as 1051 or 1052 King Edward promised the throne of England to Duke William of Normandy, who later became King William the Conqueror, there is little contemporary evidence of such a promise from non-Norman sources. By 1053, Edward probably realised that he would not have a son from his marriage, and he and his advisors began to search for an heir. Edward the Atheling, the son of King Edmund Ironside (reigned 1016), had been exiled from England in 1017, after his father's death. (Note: Edmund Ironside was the elder half-brother of Edward the Confessor; both were sons of Æthelred, with Edmund being the son of Ælfgifu of York, and Edward being the son of Emma of Normandy. Edmund Ironside had two sons, Edward the Exile and Edmund, who probably died while young in exile. Edward the Exile married while in exile and was the father of Edgar the Ætheling and Margaret of Scotland, the wife of King Malcolm III of Scotland.) Although Ealdred, the Bishop of Worcester, went to the Continent in search of Edward the Exile, Ian Walker, the biographer of King Harold Godwinson, feels that Stigand was behind the effort. In the end, although Edward did return to England, he died soon after his return, leaving a young son Edgar the Ætheling.

== Final years and legacy ==
=== Norman Conquest ===
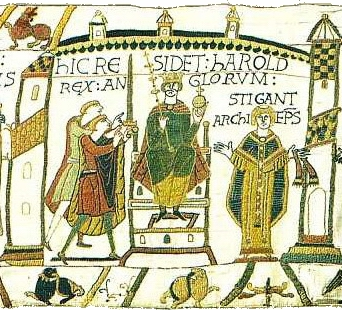
HIC RESIDET HAROLD REX ANGLORUM. STIGANT ARCHIEP(I)S(COPUS). "Here sits Harold King of the English. Archbishop Stigand". Scene immediately after the crowning of Harold by (according to the Norman tradition) Stigand. Detail from the Bayeux Tapestry.

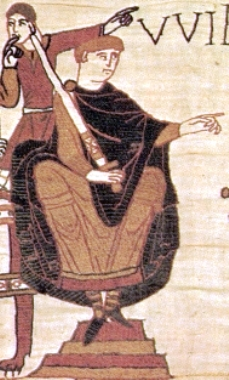
William the Conqueror, shown here from the Bayeux Tapestry, at first accepted Stigand's position, but later allowed papal legates to depose him.

King Edward, on his deathbed, left the crown to his brother-in-law Harold Godwinson, the son of Earl Godwin. Stigand performed the funeral services for Edward. Norman writers claimed that Stigand crowned Harold as king in January 1066. This is generally considered false propaganda, as it was in William's interest to portray Harold as uncanonically crowned. If Harold was improperly crowned, then William was merely claiming his rightful inheritance, and not deposing a rightful king. The Bayeux Tapestry depicts Stigand at Harold's coronation, although not actually placing the crown on Harold's head. (Note: The Tapestry also depicts Stigand wearing a pallium, which Norman sources usually claimed he had no right to wear.) The English sources claim that Ealdred, the Archbishop of York, crowned Harold, while the Norman sources claim that Stigand did so, with the conflict between the various sources probably tracing to the post-Conquest desire to vilify Harold and depict his coronation as improper. Current historical research has shown that the ceremony was performed by Ealdred, owing to the controversy about Stigand's position. However, one historian, Pauline Stafford, theorises that both archbishops may have consecrated Harold. Another historian, Frank Barlow, writing in 1979, felt that the fact that some of the English sources do not name who consecrated Harold "tip(s) the balance in favour of Stigand".

Stigand did support Harold, and was present at Edward the Confessor's deathbed. Stigand's controversial position may have influenced Pope Alexander II's support of William the Conqueror's invasion of England. The reformers, led by Archdeacon Hildebrand, later Pope Gregory VII, opposed the older type of bishop, rich and installed by the lay powers.

After the death of Harold at the Battle of Hastings, Stigand worked with Earl Edwin and Earl Morcar, as well as Archbishop Ealdred of York, to put Edgar the Ætheling on the throne. This plan did not come to fruition, however, due to opposition from the northern earls and some of the other bishops. Stigand submitted to William the Conqueror at Wallingford in early December 1066, and perhaps assisted at his coronation on Christmas Day, 1066, although the coronation was performed by Ealdred. William took Stigand with him to Normandy in 1067, although whether this was because William did not trust the archbishop, as the medieval chronicler William of Poitiers alleges, is uncertain. Stigand was present at the coronation of William's queen, Matilda, in 1068, although once more the ceremony was actually performed by Ealdred.

=== Deposition and death ===
After the first rebellions broke out in late 1067, William adopted a policy of conciliation towards the church. He gave Stigand a place at court, as well as giving administrative positions to Ealdred of York and Æthelwig, Abbot of Evesham. Archbishop Stigand appears on several royal charters in 1069, along with both Norman and English leaders. He even consecrated Remigius de Fécamp as Bishop of Dorchester in 1067. Once the danger of rebellion was past, however, William had no further need of Stigand. At a council held at Winchester at Easter 1070, the bishops met with papal legates from Alexander II. On 11 April 1070 Stigand was deposed by the papal legate, Ermenfrid, Bishop of Sion in the Alps, and was imprisoned at Winchester. His brother Æthelmær, Bishop of Elmham, was also deposed at the same council. Shortly afterward, Aethelric the Bishop of Selsey, Ethelwin the Bishop of Durham, and Leofwin Bishop of Lichfield, who was married, were deposed at a council held at Windsor. There were three reasons given for Stigand's deposition: that he held the bishopric of Winchester in plurality with Canterbury; that he not only occupied Canterbury after Robert of Jumièges fled but also seized Robert's pallium which was left behind; and that he received his own pallium from Benedict X, an anti-pope. Some accounts state that Stigand did appear at the council which deposed him, but nothing is recorded of any defence that he attempted. The charges against his brother are nowhere stated, leading to a belief that the depositions were mainly political. That spring he had deposited his personal wealth at Ely Abbey for safekeeping, but King William confiscated it after his deposition, along with his estates. The king appointed Lanfranc, a native of Italy and a scholar and abbot in Normandy, as the new archbishop.

King William appears to have left the initiative for Stigand's deposition to the papacy and did nothing to hinder Stigand's authority until the papal legates arrived in England to depose the archbishop and reform the English Church. Besides witnessing charters and consecrating Remigius, Stigand appears to have been a member of the royal council and able to move freely about the country. But after the arrival of the legates, William did nothing to protect Stigand from deposition, and the archbishop later accused the king of acting with bad faith. Stigand may even have been surprised that the legates wished him deposed. It was probably the death of Ealdred in 1069 that moved the pope to send the legates, as that left only one archbishop in England; and he was not considered legitimate and unable to consecrate bishops. The historian George Garnett draws the parallel between the treatment of King Harold in the Domesday Book, where he is essentially ignored as king, and Stigand's treatment after his deposition, where his time as archbishop is as much as possible treated as not occurring.

Stigand died in 1072 while still imprisoned, and his death was commemorated on 21 February or 22 February. Sometime between his deposition and his death, the widow of King Edward and sister of King Harold, Edith of Wessex, visited him in his imprisonment and allegedly told him to take better care of himself. He was buried in the Old Minster at Winchester.

At King Edward's death, only the royal estates and the estates of Harold were larger and wealthier than those held by Stigand. Medieval writers condemned him for his greed and for his pluralism. Hugh the Chanter, a medieval chronicler, claimed that the confiscated wealth of Stigand helped keep King William on the throne. A recent study of his wealth and how it was earned shows that while he did engage in some exploitative methods to gain some of his wealth, other lands were gained through inheritance or through royal favour. The same study shows little evidence that he despoiled his episcopal estates, although the record towards monastic houses is more suspect. There is no complaint in contemporary records about his private life, and the accusations that he committed simony and was illiterate only date from the 12th century.

Although monastic chroniclers after the Norman Conquest accused him of crimes such as perjury and homicide, they do not provide any evidence of those crimes. Almost 100 years after his death, another Archbishop of Canterbury, Thomas Becket, was taunted in 1164 by King Henry II's barons with Stigand's fate for daring to oppose his king. Modern historians views tend to see him as either a wily politician and indifferent bishop or to see him purely in terms of his ecclesiastical failings. The historian Frank Stenton felt that his "whole career shows that he was essentially a politician". Concurring with this, the historian Nick Higham said that "Stigand was a seasoned politician whose career had been built on an accurate reading of the balance of power." Another historian, Eric John, said that "Stigand had a fair claim to be the worst bishop of Christendom". However, the historian Frank Barlow felt that "he was a man of cultured tastes, a patron of the arts who was generous to the monasteries which he held". Alexander Rumble argued that Stigand was unlucky in living past the Conquest, stating that it could be said that Stigand was "unlucky to live so long that he saw in his lifetime not only the end of the Anglo-Saxon state but also the challenging of uncanonical, but hitherto tolerated, practices by a wave of papal reforms".

== Citations ==
Catholic Church titles
Preceded by Ælfric III	Bishop of Elmham; 1043	Succeeded by Grimketel
Preceded by Grimketel	Bishop of Elmham; 1044–1047	Succeeded by Æthelmær
Preceded by Ælfwine of Winchester	Bishop of Winchester; 1047–1070	Succeeded by Walkelin
Preceded by Robert of Jumièges	Archbishop of Canterbury; 1052–1070	Succeeded by Lanfranc
