= Ælfric =

- Pronunciation: Old English pronunciation: [ˈæɫvriːk]
- Gender: Masculine
- Language: Middle English, Old English

Origin
- Meaning: "Elf-king"/Powerful elf

Other names
- Alternative spelling: Averie, Averi
- Cognates: Aubrey, Alberic

Ælfric (Old English Ælfrīc, Middle English Elfric) is an Anglo-Saxon given name, consisting of the elements ælf, "elf" and ric, "a powerful person, ruler".

== Churchmen ==
- Ælfric of Eynsham (c. 955–c. 1010), late 10th century Anglo-Saxon abbot and writer
- Ælfric of Abingdon (died 1005), late 10th century Anglo-Saxon Archbishop of Canterbury
- Ælfric Bata (or "the bat") (fl. 1005)
- Ælfric Puttoc (died 1051), 11th century Anglo-Saxon Archbishop of York
- Ælfric of Crediton, late 10th century Anglo-Saxon Bishop of Crediton
- Ælfric (Bishop of Hereford), mid 10th century Anglo-Saxon Bishop of Hereford
- Ælfric of Ramsbury (fl. 940s), Bishop of Ramsbury
- Ælfric (archbishop-elect of Canterbury) (fl. 1050), Benedictine monk elected to but denied the see of Canterbury
- Ælfric I (died c. 973), Bishop of Elmham
- Ælfric II (died 1038), Bishop of Elmham
- Ælfric III (died c. 1042), Bishop of Elmham

== Laymen ==
- Ælfric Cild, late 10th century Anglo-Saxon Ealdorman of Mercia
- Ælfric of Hampshire, late 10th century/early 11th century Anglo-Saxon Ealdorman of Hampshire
- Ælfric Modercope, 11th century Anglo-Danish thegn

== See also ==
- Elfric (comics), an antagonist in the fantasy comic series Sláine
- Aubrey
