= Nicholas West =

English bishop and diplomatist (1461–1533)

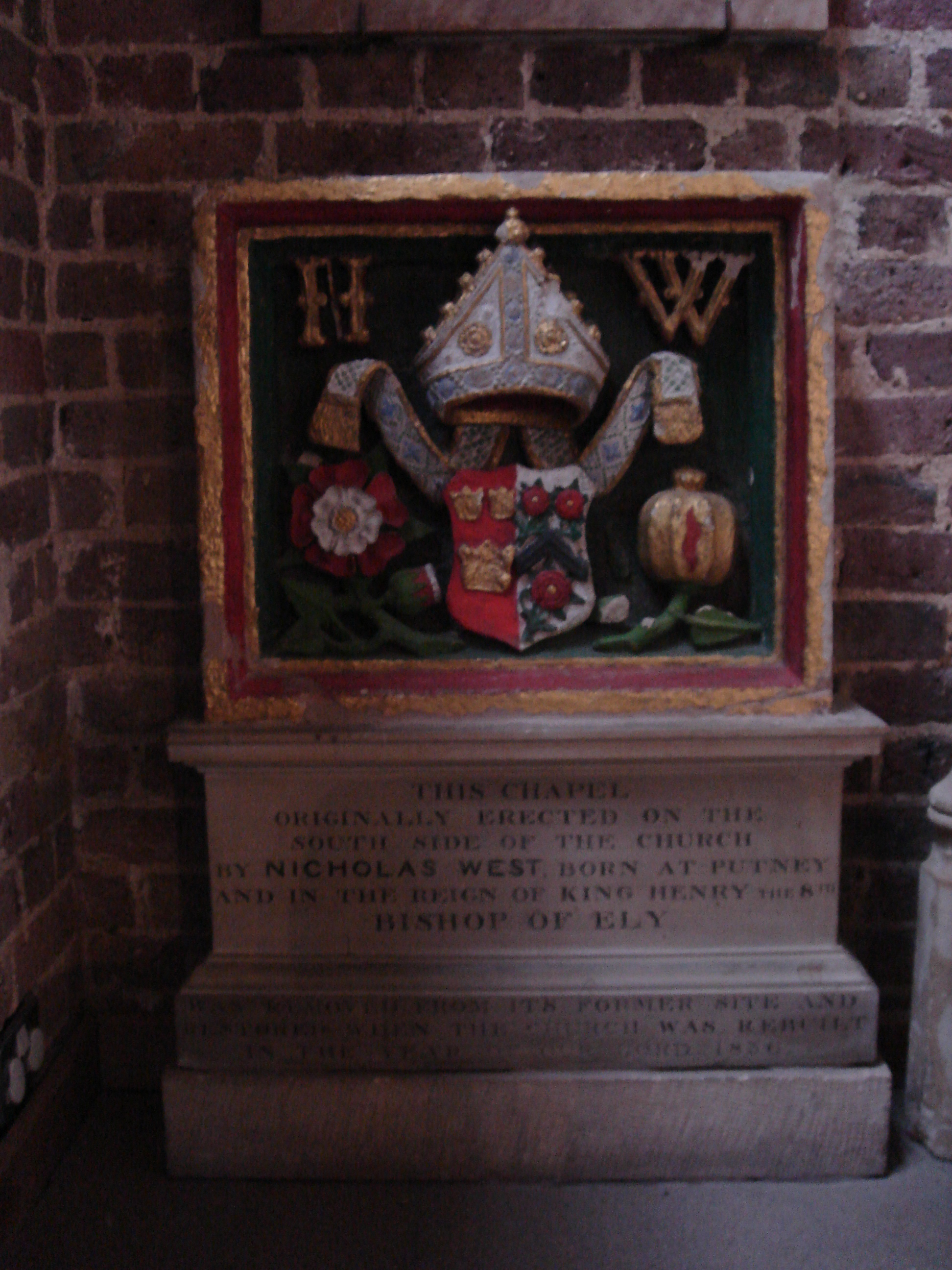
Monument to Nicholas West, St Mary's Church, Putney, showing the arms of the See of Ely impaling West (shown here as: Argent, a chevron sable between three roses gules slipped and leaved vert), with heraldic badges below, the Tudor Rose of King Henry VIII and the Pomegranate of Queen Katherine of Aragon

Nicholas West (1461—28 April 1533), was an English bishop and diplomatist, born at Putney in Surrey, and educated at Eton and at King's College, Cambridge, of which he became a fellow in 1486. He also had periods of study at Oxford and Bologna.

He was soon ordained and appointed rector of Egglescliffe, Durham, receiving a little later two other livings and becoming chaplain to King Henry VII.

In 1509 Henry VIII appointed him dean of St George's Chapel, Windsor Castle (during which times its fan vaulting was completed), and in 1515 he was elected bishop of Ely. Prior to his elevation, West was (or was also) Archdeacon of Derby. West's long and successful career as a diplomatist began in 1502 through his friendship with Richard Foxe, bishop of Durham.

In the interests of Henry VII he visited the German king Maximilian I and George, Duke of Saxony; in 1506 he negotiated an important commercial treaty with Flanders, and he attempted to arrange marriages between the king's daughter Mary and the future emperor Charles V, and between the king himself and Charles's sister Margaret.

By Henry VIII, West was sent many times to Scotland and France. Occupied mainly during the years 1513 and 1514 with journeys to and from Scotland, he described in his letters the ships at Leith and Newhaven and a galley being built to carry James IV to Stirling. He saw a large cannon brought down from Edinburgh Castle which was to be mounted on the Margaret. He visited Louis XII of France in the autumn of 1514, and his successor Francis I in 1515.

In 1515 also he arranged a defensive treaty between England and France, and he was principally responsible for treaties concluded between the two countries in 1518 and 1525, and at other times. He was trusted and employed on personal matters by Cardinal Wolsey. He was also involved in the negotiations at the Field of the Cloth of Gold in 1520. He helped complete the legal statutes establishing Jesus College, Cambridge, which had been founded in 1496 by one of West's predecessors as Bishop of Ely, John Alcock.

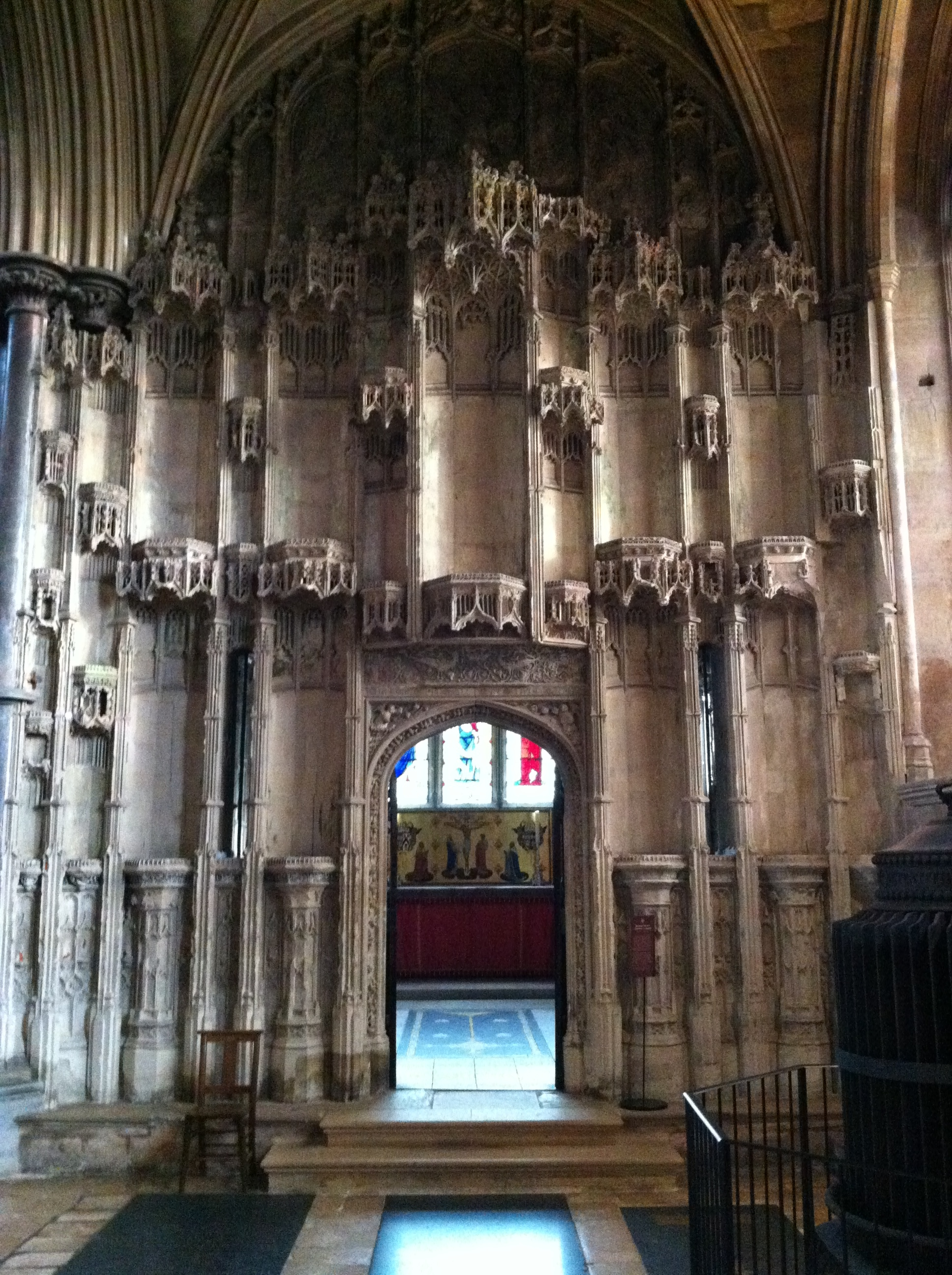
West's Chantry Chapel, Ely Cathedral. The niche statues were destroyed by his successor, the reformer Bishop Goodrich.

He became Bishop of Ely in 1515 and for the remaining 19 years of his life 'lived in greater splendour than any other prelate of his time, having more than a hundred servants.' He built a Chantry chapel at the south-east side of the eastern arm of Ely Cathedral, panelled with niches for statues (which were destroyed or disfigured just a few years later at the reformation), and with fan tracery forming the ceiling, and West's tomb on the south side.

In 1771 the chapel was also used to house the bones of seven Saxon 'benefactors of the church'. These had been translated from the old Saxon Abbey into the Norman building, and had been placed in a wall of the choir when it stood in the Octagon. When the choir stalls were moved, their enclosing wall was demolished, and the bones of Wulfstan (died 1023), Osmund of Sweden, Athelstan of Elmham, Ælfwine of Elmham, Ælfgar of Elmham, Eadnoth of Dorchester and Brythnoth, first Abbot of Ely were found, and relocated into Bishop West's chapel. Also sharing Nicholas West's chapel, against the east wall, is the tomb memorial to Bishop Sparke, who died 1836.

The bishop also built a chapel in St. Mary's Church, Putney, where he had been born.

Catholic Church titles
Preceded by James Stanley	Bishop of Ely; 1515–1534	Succeeded by Thomas Goodrich
