= Theodred =

Theodred is a male name, taken from the Anglo-Saxon words þeod ("folk", "people", "nation") and ræd ("counsel"). It can refer to:

In people:

- Theodred (Bishop of London) (fl. 915 – 955), Bishop of London
- Theodred I (fl. 964 – 979), Bishop of Elmham
- Theodred II (fl. 979 – 995), Bishop of Elmham

In fiction:

- Théodred, son of Théoden, characters in The Lord of the Rings by J. R. R. Tolkien
