= Hunferth =

Hunferth may refer to:

- Unferth, a character in Beowulf
- Hunferthus, bishop of Elmham
