= Benedict of Norwich =

Benedict of Norwich (fl. 1340) was an Augustinian friar who flourished in the reign of Edward III. According to John Bale he was distinguished for his linguistic, his scientific, and his theological skill. However, Bale finds great fault with the tendency of Benedict's teaching, accusing him of a leaning towards Novatianism, Arianism, and other heresies, and also of trusting too much to Gentile authority, 'when he should have known that the divine wisdom has no need of human inventions.'

Benedict, who was abbot of the Austin friars at Norwich, apparently made himself a great reputation by his popular discourses, and in this way so approved himself to Antony Bek, bishop of Norwich (1337–1443), that this prelate appointed him suffragan in his diocese. Bale calls him 'episcopus Cardicensis.' Benedict seems to have flourished about the year 1340. He was buried at Norwich, but the date of his death is not known.

His writings, as enumerated by Bale, consisted of an Alphabet of Aristotle, sermons for a year, and hortatory epistles. William Stubbs thought Benedict was suffragan of both Winchester and Norwich from 1333 to 1346.
