= Saint Humbert =

Saint Humbert may refer to:

- Humbert of Maroilles (d. 680), Frankish saint
- Emebert or Ablebert (8th century)
- Humbertus (d. 870), bishop of Elmham.
- Humbert III of Savoy, called Blessed, or The Saint
