= Nicholas Hawkins (priest) =

Nicholas Hawkins, LL.D. (c.1495–1534) was an English cleric and diplomat.

== Life ==
He was the nephew and godson of Nicholas West, Bishop of Ely, and was born at Putney. Educated at Eton College, he was elected a scholar of King's College, Cambridge, in 1514, graduating B.A. in 1519.

Hawkins became rector of Doddington in the Isle of Ely (19 January 1519), of East Dereham, Norfolk (1520), and Snailwell, Cambridgeshire (20 June 1526). He concentrated on civil and canon law, proceeded to the degree of LL.D., and was admitted an advocate 30 November 1528. According to a letter of Eustace Chapuys, Hawkins was imprisoned for Lutheranism, but subsequently recanted.

A career diplomat of the crown, Hawkins was collated to the archdeaconry of Ely, to which he was admitted by proxy 9 November 1527 while he was on a mission, resigning the rectory of Doddington. As archdeacon he attended the Convocation of 1529. In the pursuit of the divorce of Henry VIII, Hawkins's reputation saw his appointment in 1532 as resident ambassador at the Imperial court in succession to Thomas Cranmer. Hawkins was instructed to procure opinions on the divorce, and was given funds. A commission was also given to him, Girolamo Ghinucci, Cranmer, and others, to treat for a universal peace.

Hawkins landed at Calais 5 October, and reached Mantua 16 November, when he had an audience with Emperor Charles V, and his credentials were accepted. He was translating into Latin Henry's The Glass of Truth on the unlawfulness of Levirate marriage. By Christmas Eve he had reached Bologna, where Pope Clement VII had come to confer with the Emperor, he wrote to the king that he had finished his translation, and requested the book De Potestate Papæ. At the same time he complained to Thomas Cromwell that while the other ambassadors had silver plate he was compelled to eat off pewter.

By 22 February 1533 Hawkins had had an interview about the divorce with the Pope, who played for time by asking for more information. Hawkins followed the Emperor to Spain: writing to Cranmer from Barcelona, 11 June, he complained of lack of money. Cranmer replied, 17 June, in a well-known letter, describing the promulgation of the sentence of divorce at Dunstable and Anne Boleyn's private marriage with Henry; also sending money.

During the latter half of 1533 letters passed between the king and Hawkins, who had moved from Barcelona to Almunia de San Juan. Henry dictated what Hawkins was to say to the Emperor in justification of the divorce; and asked to contradict the report that his aunt Catherine of Aragon and the Princess Mary Tudor were ill-treated. In December Hawkins received his last letter from Cranmer, announcing the birth of Elizabeth. Henry VIII designated Hawkins bishop of Ely late in 1533, but no formal election had taken place when the news arrived in England of Hawkins's death.

Hawkins died of dysentery early in January 1534 at Balbase, in the Kingdom of Aragon. The Emperor sent him medicines in his last illness. According to Chapuys, Anne Boleyn showed more grief at his death than the king, and suggested that he had been poisoned.

== Notes ==
Attribution

This article incorporates text from a publication now in the public domain: Stephen, Leslie, ed. (1885). "Hawkins, Nicholas". Dictionary of National Biography. Vol. 2. London: Smith, Elder & Co.
