= Richard de Beaufou =

12th-century Bishop of Avranches

- Diocese: Diocese of Avranches
- See: Bishop of Avranches
- Elected: 1134
- Term ended: 1142

Personal details
- Born: Richard

Richard de Beaufou (sometimes Richard of Belfou) was a medieval Bishop of Avranches. He was probably related to William de Beaufeu who was Bishop of Norwich from 1085 to 1091. Richard served as bishop from 1134 to 1142.
