= Eanfrith =

Eanfrith may refer to:

- Eanfrith of Bernicia (590–634), briefly King of Bernicia
- Eanfrith of Hwicce (fl. c. 660–685), King of Hwicce
- Eanfrith of Elmham (died c. 769), Bishop of Elmham

== See also ==
- Eadfrith
