= Thomas Goodrich (bishop) =

English bishop

The Right Reverend and Right Honourable Thomas Goodrich
- Bishop of Ely
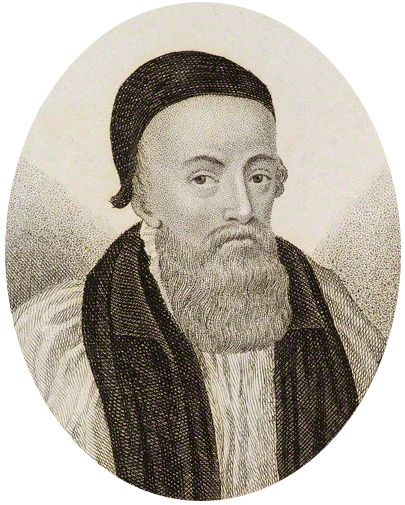
- Church: Church of England / Roman Catholic
- Installed: 1534
- Term ended: 10 May 1554
- Predecessor: Nicholas West
- Successor: Thomas Thirlby

Orders
- Consecration: 19 April 1534 by Thomas Cranmer

Personal details
- Born: East Kirkby, Lincolnshire, England
- Died: 10 May 1554

Thomas Goodrich (or Goodricke; died 10 May 1554) was an English ecclesiastic and statesman who was Bishop of Ely from 1534 until his death.

== Life ==
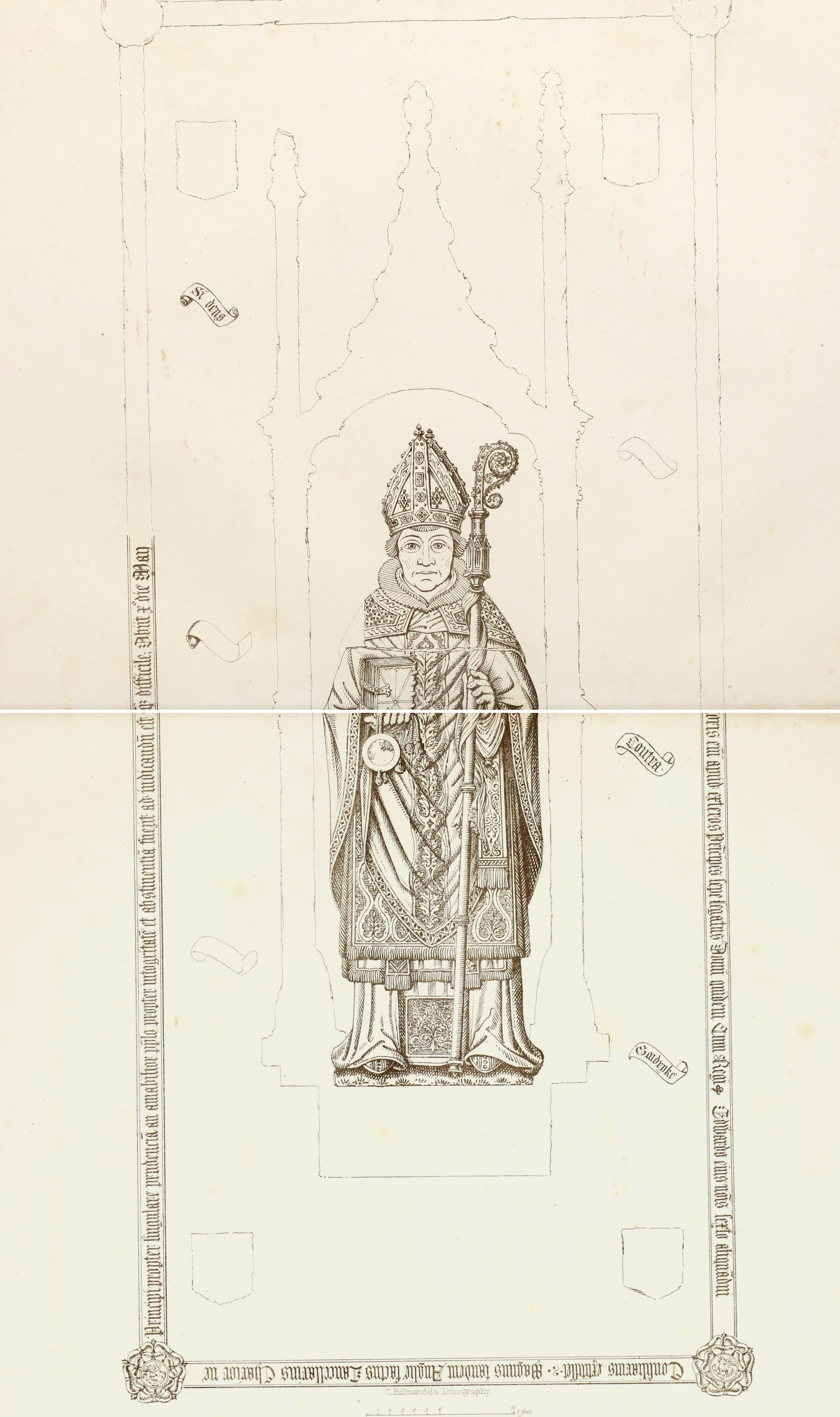
Memorial brass to Bishop Goodrich in Ely Cathedral

He was a son of William Goodrich Goodricke) of Hegesset, Co. Suffolk, England, and brother of Henry Goodricke and John Goodrich (Goodricke) of Ribston Hall, North Yorkshire.

He was educated at Corpus Christi College, Cambridge, afterwards becoming a fellow of Jesus College in the same university. He was among the divines consulted about the legality of Henry VIII's marriage with Catherine of Aragon, became one of the royal chaplains about 1530, and became Bishop of Ely in 1534; he was consecrated a bishop on 19 April 1534, by Thomas Cranmer, Archbishop of Canterbury, assisted by John Longland, Bishop of Lincoln; and Christopher Lord, suffragan bishop of Canterbury and Bishop of Sidon. The diplomat Nicholas Hawkins had been the successor in waiting for his uncle Nicholas West; but he had recently died on a mission to Emperor Charles V.

Goodrich was favourable to the Reformation, helped in 1537 to draw up the Institution of a Christian Man (known as the Bishops' Book), and translated the Gospel of St John for the revised New Testament.

Upon the accession of King Edward VI in 1547, the bishop was made a member of the Privy Council of England, and took a conspicuous part in public affairs during the reign. "A busy secular spirited man," as the historian Gilbert Burnet called him, he was equally opposed to the zealots of the "old" and the "new religion."

He assisted to compile the First Prayer Book of Edward VI, was one of the commissioners for the trial of Bishop Gardiner, and in January 1552, succeeded Richard Rich as Lord High Chancellor. This office he continued to hold during the 9 days’ reign of Lady Jane Grey (July 1553); but he made his peace with Queen Mary, conformed to the restored Catholic religion, and, though deprived of the Chancellorship, was allowed to keep his Bishopric until his death. He was buried in Ely Cathedral.

== Notes ==
Church of England titles
| Preceded by Nicholas West | Bishop of Ely; 1534–1554 | Succeeded by Thomas Thirlby |
Political offices
| Preceded by Richard Rich, 1st Baron Rich | Lord Chancellor; 1552–1553 | Succeeded by Stephen Gardiner |
