= Æthelfrith (disambiguation) =

Æthelfrith (died c. 616) was King of Bernicia and Deira in northern England.

Æthelfrith or Aethelfrith may also refer to:

- Æthelfrith of Elmham (died c. 745), Bishop of Elmham
- Æthelfrith of Mercia (fl. 883–915), Ealdorman in Mercia
