= Bedwinus =

7th-century bishop of Elmham, England

- Bishop of Elmham
- Installed: c. 673
- Term ended: c. 693
- Predecessor: Diocese Established; Bifus (as Bishop of the East Angles)
- Successor: Northbertus

Orders
- Consecration: c. 673

Personal details
- Died: c. 693
- Denomination: Christian

Bedwinus (Note: Or Beaduwine or Badwine) was an English cleric who was the first Bishop of Elmham.

Bedwinus was consecrated in 673 or soon afterwards and died sometime after 693.

== Career as bishop ==
Bedwinus was the first cleric to be appointed bishop of the See of Elmham; which was created alongside the See of Dunwich to replace the larger Diocese of East Anglia. The diocese was split by Theodore of Tarsus, the Archbishop of Canterbury; who appointed Bedwinus as bishop.

== Notes ==
Christian titles
New title	Bishop of Elmham; 673-after 693	Succeeded by Northbertus
