= John of Oxford =

12th-century Bishop of Norwich

- Bishop of Norwich
- Elected: 26 November 1175
- Term ended: 2 June 1200
- Predecessor: William de Turbeville
- Successor: John de Gray
- Other post: Dean of Salisbury

Orders
- Consecration: 14 December 1175

Personal details
- Died: 2 June 1200
- Denomination: Roman Catholic

John of Oxford (died 2 June 1200) was a medieval Bishop of Norwich.

John's father was Henry of Oxford, sheriff of Oxford. He was a royal clerk and represented King Henry II at a diet held in May 1165 at Würzburg that dealt with the issue of the Antipope Paschal III. Some reports held that John supported the antipope on behalf of Henry II, but John denied this charge. Bishop Josceline de Bohon of Salisbury appointed John Dean of Salisbury, but the appointment was overruled by Pope Alexander III on 8 June 1166 because of John's dealings with the antipope and because some of the cathedral chapter were absent from the election. Archbishop Thomas Becket then excommunicated John on 12 June 1166, and both the chapter and the king appealed to the pope, the king sending John to Rome. John then surrendered the office to the pope and was reappointed by the pope before December 1166.

John was elected to the see of Norwich on 26 November 1175 and was consecrated on 14 December 1175. He died on 2 June 1200.

== Citations ==
Catholic Church titles
| Preceded by William de Turbeville | Bishop of Norwich; 1175–1200 | Succeeded by John de Gray |
