= William de Turbeville =

12th-century Bishop of Norwich

- Bishop of Norwich
- Elected: either 1146 or early 1147
- Term ended: January 1174
- Predecessor: Everard
- Successor: John of Oxford

Orders
- Consecration: c. 1147

Personal details
- Born: c. 1095
- Died: 16 or 17 January 1174 Norwich, Norfolk
- Denomination: Roman Catholic

William de Turbeville (or William Turbe; c. 1095 – January 1174) was a medieval Bishop of Norwich.

== Life ==
Turbeville was educated in the Benedictine priory of Norwich Cathedral. Here he also made religious profession, first as a teacher and later as prior. He first held the office of precentor of the Diocese of Norwich from about 1136, and was subsequently Prior of Norwich.

Turbeville was present at the Easter synod of 1144 when Godwin Stuart falsely alleged that his nephew, William of Norwich, a boy of about 12, had been murdered by the Jews of Norwich during the preceding Holy Week. When Turbeville became bishop in 1146 or early 1147 he propagated the cult of the "boy-martyr". On four occasions he had the boy's remains transferred to more honourable places, and in 1168 erected a chapel in his honour in Thorpe Wood, where the boy's body was said to have been found. He persuaded Thomas of Monmouth, a monk of Norwich priory, to write The Life and Miracles of St William of Norwich about 1173, the only extant authority for the legend of William, which is now commonly discredited.

Turbeville attended the Council of Rheims in 1148.

Turbeville died on 16 January 1174 or 17 January 1174.

== Citations ==
Catholic Church titles
Preceded by Everard	Bishop of Norwich; 1146–1174	Succeeded by John of Oxford
