= Sybba =

9th-century Bishop of Elmham

- Bishop of Elmham
- Appointed: before 814
- Term ended: after 816
- Predecessor: Alherdus
- Successor: Hunferthus

Orders
- Consecration: before 814

Personal details
- Died: after 816
- Denomination: Christian

Sybba (or Sibba) was a medieval Bishop of Elmham. He was consecrated before 814 and died sometime after 816.

Christian titles
Preceded by Alherdus	Bishop of Elmham before 814-after 816	Succeeded by Hunferthus
