= Hunberht =

9th-century Bishop of Elmham

- Bishop of Elmham
- Appointed: by 824
- Term ended: 845 or 856, or November 869
- Predecessor: Hunferthus
- Successor: Eadwulf

Orders
- Consecration: by 824

Personal details
- Died: 845 or 856, or November 869

Hunberht or Humberht was a medieval Bishop of Elmham.

Hunberht was consecrated by 824. The twelfth-century Annals of St Neots says that he crowned Edmund the Martyr as king at Burna on Christmas Day 856, but no source is known for this statement.

Hunberht's date of death is uncertain; he may have died 845 or 856 or in November 869.

After Hunberht, there was an interruption with the episcopal succession through the Danish Viking invasions in the late 9th and early 10th centuries. By the mid-10th century, the sees Elmham and Dunwich had been united under Bishop Eadwulf.

== Sources ==
- Fryde, E. B.; et al., eds. (1996). Handbook of British Chronology (3rd with corrections ed.). Cambridge, UK: Cambridge University Press. ISBN 978-0-521-56350-5.
- Gransden, Antonia (2004). "Edmund [St Edmund] (d. 869)". Oxford Dictionary of National Biography. Oxford University Press. doi:10.1093/ref:odnb/8500. (subscription, Wikipedia Library access or UK public library membership required)
- Keynes, Simon (2002). An Atlas of Attestations in Anglo-Saxon Charters, c.670-1066. Cambridge, UK: Dept. of Anglo-Saxon, Norse, and Celtic, University of Cambridge, UK. ISBN 978-0-9532697-6-1.

Christian titles
Preceded by Hunferthus	Bishop of Elmham before 824-after 845	Succeeded by Eadwulf
