= Æthelmær of Elmham =

11th-century Bishop of Elmham

эthelmaer
- Bishop of Elmham
- Appointed: 1047
- Term ended: deposed 1070
- Predecessor: Stigand
- Successor: Herfast

Orders
- Consecration: 1047

Personal details
- Denomination: Roman Catholic Church

Æthelmær (or Æthelmær) was a medieval Bishop of Elmham.

== Life ==
Æthelmaer was the brother of Stigand, Archbishop of Canterbury. He was consecrated in 1047 and deprived of office circa 11 April 1070 by Ermenfrid, bishop of Sion, who was the papal legate to England.

Catholic Church titles
Preceded by Stigand	Bishop of Elmham; 1047-1070	Succeeded by Herfast
