= Alherdus =

8th and 9th-century Bishop of Elmham

Aldherdus
- Bishop of Elmham
- Appointed: before 785
- Term ended: after 805
- Predecessor: Æthelwulf
- Successor: Sybba

Orders
- Consecration: before 785

Personal details
- Died: after 805
- Denomination: Christian

Aldherus (Note: Or Alhheard or Ealheard or Ealhheard) was a medieval Bishop of Elmham.

Aldherus was consecrated before 785 and died sometime after 805.

== Notes ==
Christian titles
Preceded by Æthelwulf	Bishop of Elmham before 785-after 805	Succeeded by Sybba
