= Thomas Jane (bishop) =

15th-century Bishop of Norwich

- Bishop of Norwich
- Appointed: 14 June 1499
- Term ended: September 1500
- Predecessor: James Goldwell
- Successor: Richard Nykke

Orders
- Consecration: 20 October 1499

Personal details
- Died: September 1500
- Denomination: Roman Catholic

Thomas Jane (sometimes Jan; died September 1500) was a medieval Bishop of Norwich.

Educated at New College, Oxford, Jane was Rector of the Church of Saint Mary the Virgin in Hayes, Middlesex from 1473 to 1499. He was collated Archdeacon of Essex on 21 July 1480 and nominated to the bishopric on 14 June 1499 and was consecrated later in 1499, probably on 20 October. From 1496 to 1500 he was also a Canon of Windsor and Dean of the Chapel Royal.

Jane died in September 1500.

== Citations ==
Catholic Church titles
Preceded by James Goldwell	Bishop of Norwich; 1499–1500	Succeeded by Richard Nykke
