= James Goldwell =

15th-century Bishop of Norwich

- Bishop of Norwich
- Appointed: 17 July 1472
- Term ended: 15 February 1499
- Predecessor: Walter Hart
- Successor: Thomas Jane
- Other post: Dean of Salisbury

Orders
- Consecration: 4 October 1472

Personal details
- Died: 15 February 1499
- Denomination: Roman Catholic

James Goldwell (died 15 February 1499) was a medieval Dean of Salisbury and Bishop of Norwich.

== Life ==
Goldwell was one of the sons of William and Avice Goldwell, both of whom died in 1485. He had a brother, Nicholas Goldwell, who survived him. He was nominated on 17 July 1472 and was consecrated on 4 October 1472. He died on 15 February 1499.

== Career ==
Goldwell was educated at All Souls College, Oxford where he graduated B.Can.L. 1449 and D.C.L 1452.

He was appointed:

- President of St George's Hall in the Castle, Oxford 1452
- Rector of St John the Evangelist, London 1455
- Rector of Rivenhall, Essex 1455
- Prebendary of Widland in St Paul's Cathedral 1457
- Prebendary of Sneating in St Paul's Cathedral 1458
- Prebendary of Islington in St Paul's Cathedral 1459–1461
- Register of the Order of the Garter 1460
- Rector of Cliffe-at-Hoo, Kent
- Archdeacon of Essex, 1461
- Canon of Hereford Cathedral 1461
- Prebenary of Stratford in Salisbury Cathedral 1462
- Dean of Salisbury 1463
- Principal Secretary of State to King Edward IV
- Master of the Rolls 1471
- Papal Protonotary
- Bishop of Norwich 1472, consecrated at St Blaise, Rome

Goldwell was appointed to the sixth stall in St George's Chapel, Windsor Castle in 1460 and held this until 1472.

== Citations ==
Catholic Church titles
| Preceded by Walter Hart | Bishop of Norwich; 1472–1499 | Succeeded by Thomas Jane |
