= Headulacus =

8th-century Bishop of Elmham

- Bishop of Elmham
- Appointed: before 731
- Term ended: after 731
- Predecessor: Northbertus
- Successor: Æthelfrith

Orders
- Consecration: before 731

Personal details
- Died: after 731
- Denomination: Christian

Headulacus (Note: Or Heathulac or Hathulac) was a medieval Bishop of Elmham.

Headulacus was consecrated before 731 and died sometime after that date.

== Notes ==
Christian titles
Preceded by Northbertus	Bishop of Elmham before 731-after 731	Succeeded by Æthelfrith
