= William Bateman (bishop) =

14th-century Bishop of Norwich

- Bishop of Norwich
- Elected: 23 January 1344
- Term ended: 6 January 1355 (death)
- Predecessor: Antony Bek
- Successor: Thomas Percy

Orders
- Consecration: 23 May 1344

Personal details
- Died: 6 January 1355
- Denomination: Roman Catholic

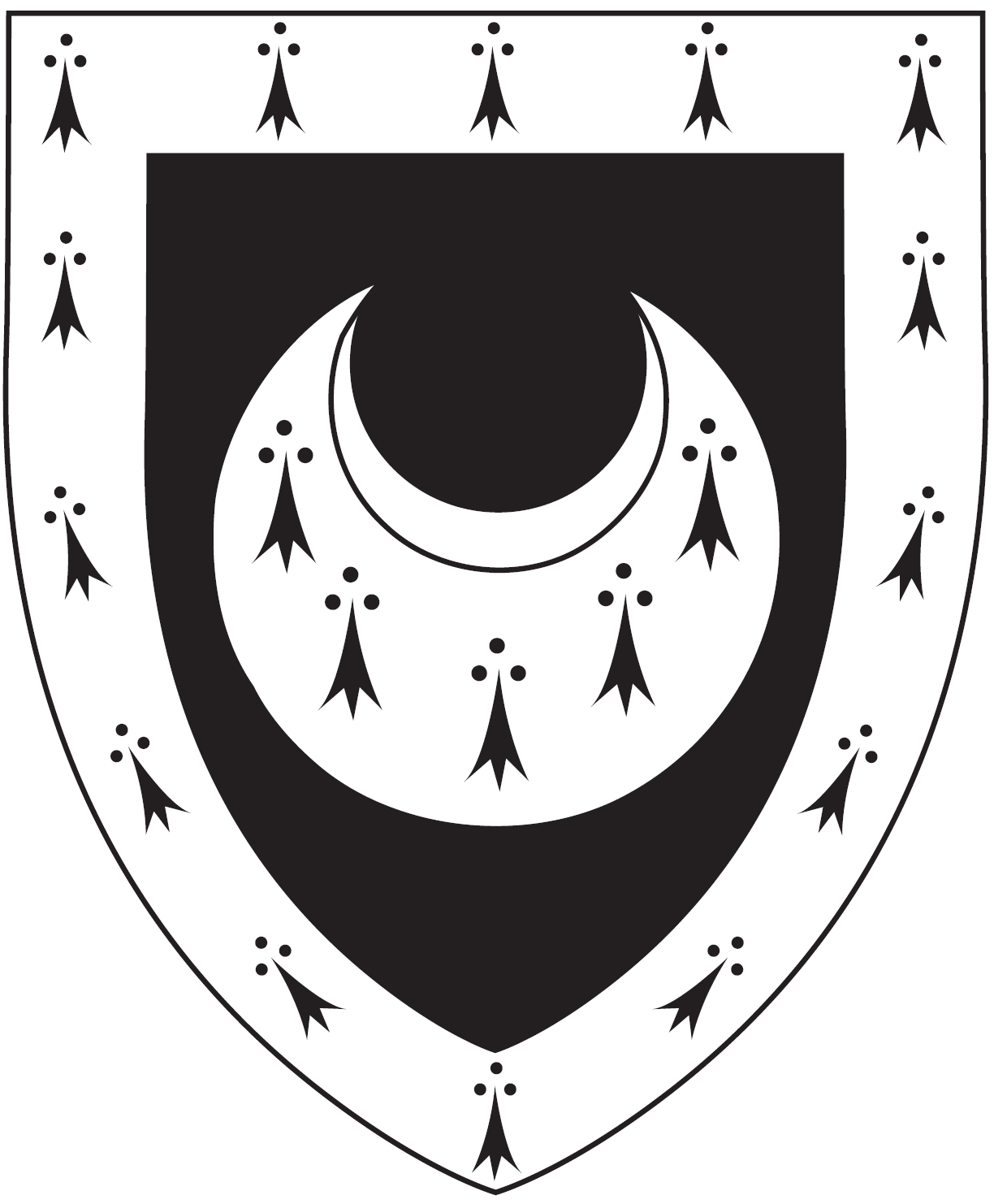
Arms of Bateman: Sable, a crescent ermine a bordure (engrailed) of the last. These were adopted as the arms of Trinity Hall, Cambridge, founded by him

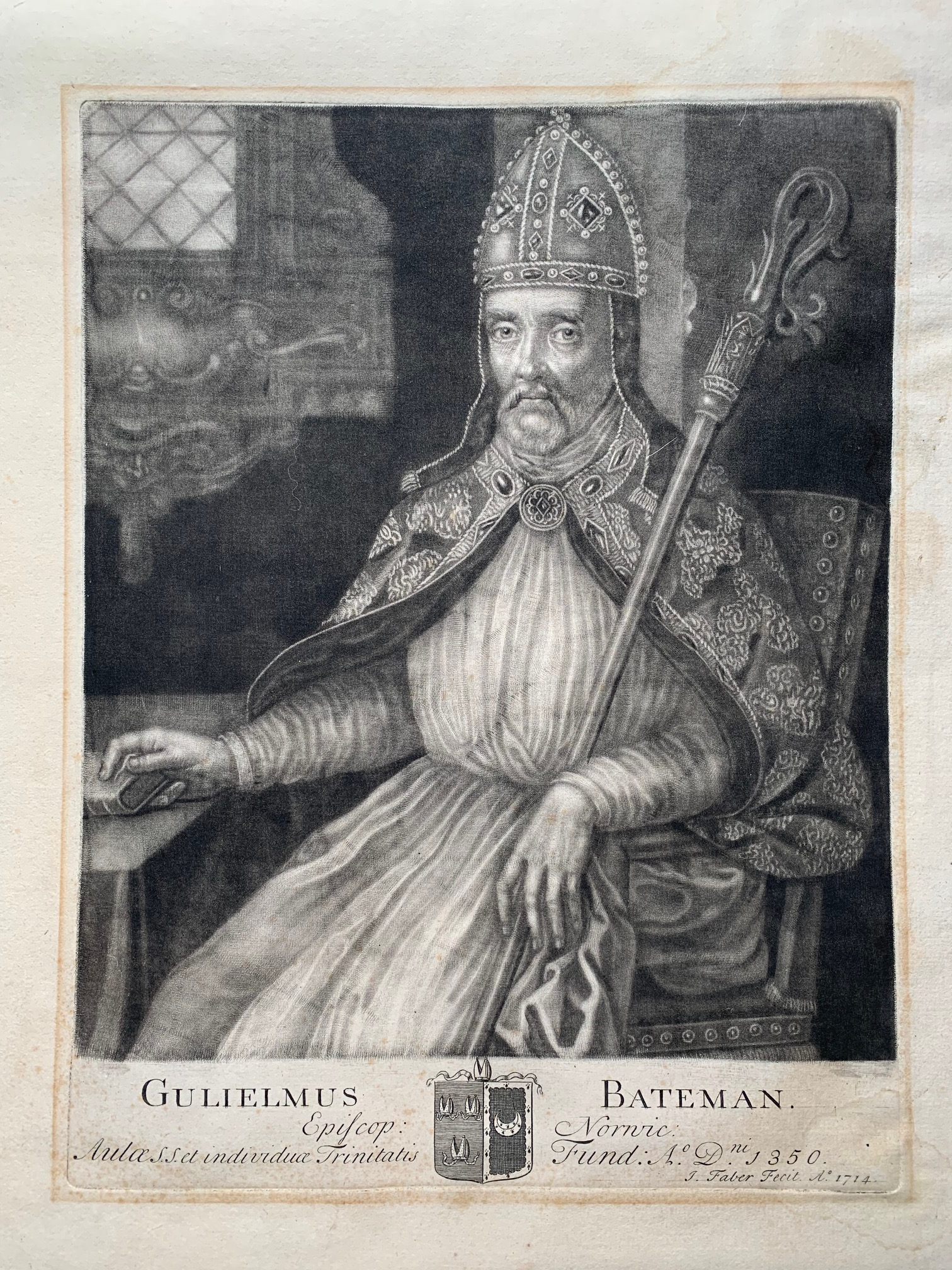

William Bateman (c. 1298 – 6 January 1355) was a medieval Bishop of Norwich.

== Life ==
Bateman was the son of William Bateman, a Norwich citizen and bailiff who was an M.P. He was born about 1298. He had two elder brothers, both of whom attained eminence. The firstborn, Sir Bartholomew Bateman, of Flixton, Suffolk, was knighted by Edward III for his martial prowess in the French wars. The second John, became a priest after the death of his wife in the plague. He was ordained by his brother on 25 June 1349, adopted the eponym John de Honingham, and was assigned to the parish of St. Peter's in Easton. William, the third son, received his education in his native city, probably in the school attached to the priory of Norwich. He graduated at Cambridge University in Civil and Canon Law.

In his thirtieth year, he was collated by Bishop William de Ayreminne to the archdeaconry of Norwich on 8 December 1328. He was introduced by Ayreminne to the court of Pope John XXII at Avignon. The young civilian's ability soon manifested itself, and the pope endeavoured to bind to himself one who seemed likely to fill an influential place in English politics.

By his desire, Bateman took up his residence at the Papal Court at Avignon, where he rose through various lucrative and dignified offices until finally, in that or the succeeding pontificate, he was appointed auditor of the palace. He is said to have fulfilled the duties of this office with such inflexible justice and solidity of judgment that he was regarded both by the pope and his court as ‘the flower of civilians and canonists’. He retained the same high reputation with John's successor, Benedict XII (1334), by whose provision he was made dean of Lincoln, which dignity we find him holding in 1340.

Edward III's wars with France had now begun, and Bateman speedily entered the long series of diplomatic negotiations which characterised the last decade of his life. Bateman's vigorous mind, business-like habits, and intimate knowledge of the law in both its provinces, specially fitted him for diplomatic employment. He was on two occasions despatched from Avignon by the pope to endeavour to effect a reconciliation between the French and English monarchs, and on 20 May 1343 he was empowered, with Hugh Despenser and others, by Edward III to negotiate for a peace with the French ambassadors before Clement VI, the king declaring that he was unable to send a solemn embassage until he had received satisfaction from Philip of Valois for his breaches of the truce. The same year, 19 December, the see of Norwich became vacant by the death of Bishop Antony Beke, and Clement gave Bateman the bishopric by ‘provision.’

Bateman was consecrated by the pope at Avignon on 23 May 1344. A few months after his consecration, he was commissioned by the king to present letters to Clement for a final peace, and once more to treat with the ambassadors of Philip before the pope as mediator. The limits of this article forbid the attempt to particularise all the repeated and for the most part fruitless negotiations, in the prosecution of which the Bishop of Norwich was during the next ten years repeatedly crossing the sea accompanied by other ambassadors. To do this would be to give a summary of the history of the period. Suffice it to say that we find him thus employed on 28 July, 25 September, and 11 October 1348; 10 March, 13 April 1349; 15 May 1350; 27 June, 26 July 1351; 19 February 1352; 30 March, 28 August, and, finally, 30 October 1354 — an embassy in the fulfilment of which he terminated his life. His repeated selection by the king for these difficult and delicate negotiations is evidence of the confidence reposed in his wisdom, statesmanship, and intimate acquaintance with the tortuous policy of the papal court.

On his consecration, Bateman carried out a visitation of his diocese. He asserted his visitatorial authority over Bury St Edmunds Abbey, which was resisted by the abbot. It was an old quarrel, inherited by both parties from their predecessors. It embittered the first three years of Bishop Bateman's episcopate, and brought him into direct collision with the judicial power. He excommunicated the abbot's attorney. The attorney brought an action against the bishop. A writ of error sued for by the bishop only resulted in the confirmation of the judgment. Bateman, however, repudiated the authority of a temporal court over spiritual persons, and refused either to pay the fine imposed or to absolve the attorney. His cattle and goods were consequently distrained, his temporalities seized, and his person was threatened with arrest. He appealed to the council called by Archbishop John de Stratford at St Paul's, on 25 September 1347, against this invasion of the privileges of the spirituality by the temporal power. How the matter ended appears not to be recorded.

The same assertion of his rights was shown in his excommunication of Robert, Lord Morley, the lord-lieutenant of the county, for the crime of poaching on the episcopal manors. He compelled the offender to do public penance. A dispute with the commonality of Lynn as to certain municipal rights ended in a compromise.

In 1349, England was visited by the Black Death. No part of the country suffered more severely than Norfolk and Suffolk, comprising the diocese of Norwich. The mortality among the clergy was frightful. The annual average of institutions to benefices for the five years from the Lady-days of 1344 and 1349 had been 81. During the year ending Lady-day 1350 the number amounted to 831. The number of clergy swept away in the diocese of Norwich alone cannot be set at less than 2,000. The bishop's brother, Sir Bartholomew Bateman, died in this year, and presumably of the plague. During the whole of this time of pestilence, Bishop Bateman remained unflinchingly at his post, never leaving his diocese for a single day, often instituting as many as twenty clergy at once. Till the plague was stayed, he travelled through his diocese, never staying long in one place, and ‘followed by the troops of clergy who came to be instituted to the benefices vacated by death. So many parishes being left without incumbents, there was a fear lest the supply of clergy should be inadequate to the draught upon it. Bishop Bateman applied to Pope Clement VI for direction, who issued a bull authorising him to ordain sixty young men two years under the canonical age, a permission of which he availed himself to a very small extent’.

One important outcome of this appalling calamity was the foundation in the following year, 1350, by Bishop Bateman of the college at Cambridge, to which, as a mark of his special devotion to the blessed Trinity, he gave the name of Trinity Hall. The bishop's object in this foundation, which was designed solely for students of canon and civil law, was to recruit the thinned ranks of the clergy of his diocese with men trained in those studies. For this purpose he became possessor of a hostel which had been purchased by John of Crawden, prior of Ely, as a place to which the monks of his house might retire for study, giving them in exchange six rectories in his diocese. His intention had been to found a master and twenty fellows, besides scholars, who were each to say a prescribed office, De Trinitate, on rising and going to bed, always to speak Latin, to dispute three times a week on some point of canon or civil law, and have the Holy Scripture read aloud during meals. The royal charter of foundation bears the date 20 November 1350.

Bateman's death in 1355 prevented the full accomplishment of his scheme. At that time the body consisted only of the master, three fellows, and two scholars. A licence for building a chapel was given by the bishop of Ely on 30 May 1352, to which the founder bequeathed vestments, jewels, and plate.

In the list of books given by the bishop to his new college, theology is represented only by a small Bible together with a Compendium and a Recapitulation of the Bible, all the rest being books of canon or civil law. His own private library, however, reverting to the college after his death, was more adequately furnished with theological works. There are two surviving manuscripts from his donation: Repertorium biblicum (MS8), and the Tabula Martiniana (MS15).

Two years previously, in 1348, a clergyman of Bateman's diocese, Edmund Gonville, rector of Terrington, had obtained licence from Edward III to found a college for twenty scholars in honour of the Annunciation of the Blessed Virgin. Gonville died before his foundation had been fully established, and had he not named Bishop Bateman as his executor the whole design would probably have collapsed. Bateman carried out Gonville's scheme as a second founder, though with some important changes in its character, 21 December 1351. He removed the college to its present site, near his earlier foundation, and substituted for Gonville's statutes a selection from those of Trinity Hall, by which the requirement of an almost exclusively theological training was abolished. The first Master was Bateman's former chaplain, John Colton, later Archbishop of Armagh.

On 17 September 1353 Bateman, as founder of the two societies, ratified an agreement of fraternal affection and mutual help between them ‘as scions of the same stock,’ the precedence, however, being assigned to the members of Trinity Hall, tanquam fratres primogeniti. Bateman's interest in the university of Cambridge, in which in his own words he had ‘received the first elements of learning, and, though undeservedly, the doctor's degree,’ had been shown at an earlier period by a gift of £100, as a sum from which members of the university might borrow on pledges up to £4. Such donations were at that period not at all rare.

The last year of Bateman's busy life was marked by no less than three of those diplomatic missions on which he had so often, and on the whole, so fruitlessly, crossed the Channel. He was again commissioned, 30 March 1354, with William de Clinton, 1st Earl of Huntingdon, and others, to negotiate a final peace with France; and again, on 28 August of the same year, to treat with the French ambassadors before the pope. But Edward's terms were refused by the French king. Once again, and for the last time, 30 October, Bishop Bateman set out on his familiar journey, accompanied by Henry of Grosmont, 1st Duke of Lancaster, and Michael Northburgh, bishop of London, to treat before the pope concerning the king's castles and lands in France. The negotiations were prolonged. The new year found the commissioners still at Avignon. The delay was fatal. A sudden sickness, popularly attributed to poison, attacked the bishop, and he died on the festival of the Epiphany, 6 January 1355.

He was buried before the high altar of Avignon Cathedral, the patriarch of Jerusalem officiating, and the whole body of cardinals attending the obsequies with the exception of one detained by illness. Trinity Hall still preserves their founder's cup and cover of silver-gilt, bearing his arms. An image of the Trinity in a tabernacle, silver-gilt, given by him to the high altar of Norwich Cathedral, as well as a smaller one, shared the fate of superstitious images at the Reformation.

== Citations ==
Religious titles
Preceded by Antony Bek	Bishop of Norwich; 1344–1355	Succeeded by Thomas Percy
