= Thomas Percy (bishop of Norwich) =

14th-century Bishop of Norwich

- Bishop of Norwich
- Appointed: 4 February 1355
- Term ended: 3 January 1369
- Predecessor: William Bateman
- Successor: Henry le Despenser

Orders
- Consecration: 3 January 1356

Personal details
- Born: c. 1328
- Died: 8 August 1369
- Denomination: Roman Catholic

Thomas Percy was a medieval Bishop of Norwich. He was the son of Henry de Percy, 2nd Baron Percy and Idonia, daughter of Robert de Clifford, 1st Baron de Clifford.

Percy was nominated 4 February 1355 and was consecrated on 3 January 1356. He died on 8 August 1369.

== Citations ==
Catholic Church titles
Preceded by William Bateman	Bishop of Norwich; 1355–1369	Succeeded by Henry le Despenser
