= Everard of Calne =

12th-century Bishop of Norwich

Everard
- Bishop of Norwich
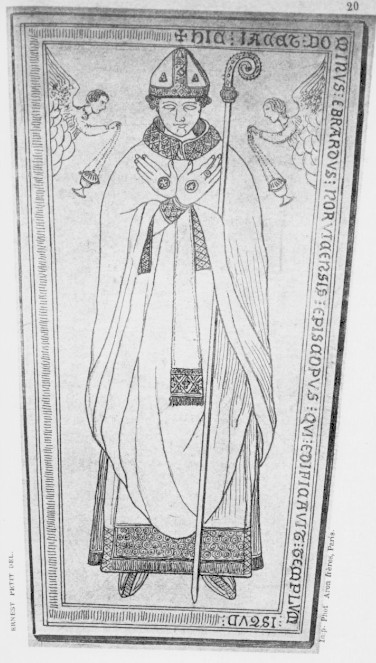
- Elected: before 12 June 1121
- Term ended: 1145 resigned
- Predecessor: Herbert de Losinga
- Successor: William de Turbeville

Orders
- Consecration: 12 June 1121

Personal details
- Born: Calne, Wiltshire
- Died: 12 October, probably 1146
- Buried: Fontenay Abbey, Côte-d'Or
- Denomination: Roman Catholic

Everard (or Everard of Calne; died probably 1146) was a medieval Bishop of Norwich.

== Life ==
Everard was from Calne in Wiltshire. He was a royal chaplain and held prebends in the diocese of London as well as an archdeacon in the diocese of Salisbury.

Everard was consecrated on 12 June 1121. He resigned the see in 1145 to be a monk at the Cistercian monastery of Fontenay in the Côte-d'Or in France.

Everard died on 12 October probably in 1146. He was buried at Fontenay before 21 September 1147.

== Citations ==
Catholic Church titles
| Preceded by Herbert de Losinga | Bishop of Norwich; 1121–1146 | Succeeded by William de Turbeville |
