= Northbertus =

8th-century Bishop of Elmham

- Bishop of Elmham
- Appointed: before 706
- Term ended: after 716
- Predecessor: Bedwinus
- Successor: Headulacus

Orders
- Consecration: before 706

Personal details
- Died: after 716
- Denomination: Christian

Northbertus (Note: Or Nothbeorht or Nothberht) was a medieval Bishop of Elmham.

Northbertus was consecrated sometime before 706. He died sometime after 716.

== Notes ==
Christian titles
Preceded by Bedwinus	Bishop of Elmham before 706-after 716	Succeeded by Headulacus
