= Richard Nykke =

16th-century Bishop of Norwich

The Right Reverend Richard Nykke
- Bishop of Norwich
- Predecessor: Thomas Jane
- Successor: William Rugg
- Other posts: Archdeacon of Exeter; Archdeacon of Wells; Canon of Windsor

Orders
- Consecration: c. 1501

Personal details
- Born: c. 1447
- Died: 1535
- Buried: Norwich Cathedral
- Denomination: Roman Catholic

Richard Nykke (or Nix or Nick; c. 1447–1535) became bishop of Norwich under Pope Alexander VI in 1515. Norwich at this time was the second-largest conurbation in England, after London.

Nykke is often called the last Catholic bishop of the diocese, but that title is also claimed by John Hopton, bishop under Mary I of England. Described as "ultra-conservative", but also "much-respected", Nykke maintained an independent line and was embroiled in conflict until blind and in his last years. While he was a natural target for Protestant propaganda, stories about him are sometimes poorly founded. One of the best known is that he said that potential heretics "savoured of the frying pan". As Robert Southey pointed out, this translates a well-known French idiom, sentir le fagot.

== Life ==
=== Early career ===
Nykke was the son of Thomas and Johanna (née Stillington) Nykke; Johanna was the sister of Robert Stillington, Bishop of Bath and Wells. Richard was educated at Trinity Hall, Cambridge. He became Rector of Ashbury in 1473; Rector of Cadbury and Prebendary of Wells in 1489; Archdeacon of Exeter in 1492; Vicar general of Bath and Wells in 1493; Prebendary of Southwell in 1493; Archdeacon of Wells in 1494; Prebendary of York in 1494; Vicar general of Durham and Rector of Bishopswearmouth in 1495; Canon of Windsor in 1497; and Dean of the Chapel Royal and Rector of High Ham in 1499.

=== Later career ===
Nykke became bishop of Norwich in 1501. After a fire in 1509, he had wooden roofing in Norwich Cathedral replaced with stone vaulting.

Nykke complained bitterly against the early Tudor use of praemunire to limit ecclesiastical jurisdiction. Involved in King's Bench cases, he made his case to William Warham (Archbishop of Canterbury), and denounced James Hobart, Attorney-General for most of the reign of Henry VII.

Nykke clashed with John Skelton, who was vicar of Diss in his diocese, from 1507. It is said that Skelton's hostility to the Dominicans led them to denounce him to Nykke for living with a woman. Skelton, however, became a folkloric character and it is not known how much of various tales about him is factual.

Nykke consistently attempted to maintain Roman orthodoxy, against Lollards, new theological thinking coming out of Cambridge – he was particularly suspicious of Gonville Hall—and the early Protestant reformers. He expressed anxiety about the distribution of William Tyndale's translation into English of the New Testament.

The reformer Thomas Bilney was burned as a heretic in Norwich, in 1531. Another suspected heretic of the same time was Nicholas Shaxton, a Lutheran sympathiser, but in his case Nykke pressured him into a recantation which saved his life.

When Thomas Cranmer was newly appointed Archbishop of Canterbury, in 1533, Nykke was one of the bishops who found ways to defy his authority. He was "brought to heel" in late 1534.

There is a confused story that in 1534 Nykke ran afoul of Henry VIII, by correspondence with the Holy See. According to the account, he was made the subject of a praemunire charge, imprisoned in the Marshalsea, and then pardoned; but this story has been doubted. In a more complex picture, Henry VIII used the legal pressure of a praemunire to force an exchange of manors of the Norwich diocese for St Benet's Abbey, Holme, Norfolk, which some claim escaped the Dissolution of the monasteries. The 1911 Encyclopædia Britannica article on Thomas Bilney says that the bishop's legal problem was proceeding to the execution of Bilney without state authority, and an impending Parliamentary inquiry. There was a charge also of infringing the liberties of the mayor of Thetford, and the bishop apparently was imprisoned. This was a King's Bench matter, and therefore formally distinct from the Cranmer issue. Money Henry extracted as a fine from the bishop went to pay for windows in King's College Chapel.

== Death ==
Nykke died blind in advanced old age and is buried in Norwich Cathedral.
