= Herfast =

11th-century Bishop of Elmham, Bishop of Thetford, and Chancellor of England

- Bishop of Elmham; then Bishop of Thetford
- Appointed: 1070
- Term ended: 1084
- Predecessor: Æthelmær, Bishop of Elmham
- Successor: William de Beaufeu, Bishop of Thetford

Orders
- Consecration: 1070

Personal details
- Died: 1084
- Denomination: Roman Catholic Church

Lord Chancellor
- In office 1068–1070
- Monarch: William I of England
- Preceded by: Office established
- Succeeded by: Osmund

Herfast or Arfast (died 1084) was a Norman cleric and bureaucrat who served as the first Lord Chancellor of Norman England from 1068 to 1070. He was also Bishop of Elmham and later Bishop of Thetford, after he moved his see there.

== Life ==
Born in Normandy, Herfast joined William the Conqueror during the Norman Conquest of England and was appointed head of the royal writing office after the Battle of Hastings. He is often considered to have been the first Lord Chancellor of England from 1068 to 1070. The office of Lord Chancellor is of unclear origins, but it is likely that a predecessor to the office existed in some form in Anglo-Saxon England before the Norman Conquest.

After serving as Lord Chancellor, he was consecrated Bishop of Elmham in 1070, but about 27 May 1072 he moved the see to Thetford, thus becoming Bishop of Thetford. He attempted to move his diocese to Bury St. Edmunds Abbey, with the assistance of his colleague Herman the Archdeacon, but the proposal was opposed by its abbot, Baldwin. Herfast finally lost in the King's Court in 1081 and was fined a crippling amount, which was unpaid when he died.

He signed the Accord of Winchester in 1072.

Bishop Herfast died in 1084. He was a married bishop, and his sons held land in Norfolk at the time of Domesday Book in 1086.

Political offices
| Preceded by Office established | Lord Chancellor; 1068–1070 | Succeeded by Osmund |
Catholic Church titles
| Preceded by Æthelmær | Bishop of Elmham; 1070–1075 | Succeeded by see moved to Thetford |
| Preceded by see moved from Elmham | Bishop of Thetford; 1075 – 1084 | Succeeded by William de Beaufeu |
