= Æthelwulf of Elmham =

8th-century Bishop of Elmham

Æthelwulf
- Bishop of Elmham
- Appointed: before 781
- Term ended: after 781
- Predecessor: Eanfrith
- Successor: Alherdus

Orders
- Consecration: before 781

Personal details
- Died: after 781
- Denomination: Christian

Æthelwulf (Note: Or Athelwolfus or Aethelwulf) was a medieval Bishop of Elmham.

Æthelwulf was consecrated before 781 and died sometime after that year.

== Notes ==
Christian titles
| Preceded by Eanfrith | Bishop of Elmham before 781-after 781 | Succeeded by Alherdus |
