= Ælfric II =

11th-century Bishop of Elmham

- Bishop of Elmham
- Appointed: between 1023 and 1038
- Term ended: December 1038
- Predecessor: Ælfwine
- Successor: Ælfric III

Orders
- Consecration: between 1023 and 1038

Personal details
- Died: December 1038
- Denomination: Christian

Ælfric II (Note: Old English: Ælfrīc) was a medieval Bishop of Elmham.

Ælfric was consecrated between 1023 and 1038 and died in December 1038.

== Notes ==
Christian titles
Preceded by Ælfwine	Bishop of Elmham c. 1030-1038	Succeeded by Ælfric III
