= Tom Licence =

British historian

Tom Oliver Licence FSA FRHistS is a British historian specialising in the period 950–1200, with an additional interest in Victorian consumer waste. He is Professor of Medieval History and Literature at the University of East Anglia and a former director of the Centre of East Anglian Studies.

== Education ==
Licence attended Westcliff High School for Boys and has an M.A. in history (2002), MPhil in medieval history (2003) and a PhD (2006) from Magdalene College, University of Cambridge. His thesis was titled England's Hermits, 970–1220.

== Career ==
Licence was appointed lecturer at the University of East Anglia in 2009 and became a professor there in 2019. For three years from 2021 he held a Leverhulme Major Research Fellowship, which relieved him from teaching duties, to support him in writing a biography of Harold Godwinson for the Yale English Monarchs series. For three years from September 2022 he held a senior research fellowship at Magdalene College, Cambridge.

His work on Victorian consumer waste, represented in his book and website What the Victorians threw away, has attracted international press coverage.

He is a Fellow of the Royal Historical Society, the Society of Antiquaries and the Higher Education Academy.

In 2020, Licence's biography of Edward the Confessor was published by Yale University Press as Edward the Confessor: Last of the Royal Blood. The book received broadly positive reviews for its revisionist take on Edward's relationship with the House of Godwin, though historian Marc Morris described it as a "royal disappointment."

Licence's biography of Harold Godwinson, Harold: Warrior King, was published in 2026. He claims that Harold's army did not march from the Battle of Stamford Bridge to the Battle of Hastings in 1066, but sailed, a claim that attracted significant media coverage.

While metal detecting in 2024, he discovered a hoard of 18 Iron Age gold coins; these were dated to between 25 BC and AD 10, in the reign of King Dubnovellaunos, ruler of the Trinovantes tribe. The hoard was classed as treasure and was recorded with the Portable Antiquities Scheme, but was dis-claimed after no museum bought them. The Bury St Edmunds Hoard was sold by auction in March 2026 for £33,200.

== Selected publications ==
- Hermits and Recluses in English society, 950–1200 (2011, Oxford UP: ISBN 978-0199592364)
- Herman the Archdeacon and Goscelin of Saint-Bertin: Miracles of St Edmund, ed. (2014), Clarendon Press ISBN 978-0199689194
- Bury St Edmunds and the Norman Conquest (2014, edited, Boydell Press: ISBN 978-1843839316)
- What the Victorians Threw Away (2015, Oxbow book: ISBN 978-1782978756)
- Edward the Confessor: Last of the Royal Blood (2020), Yale University Press, ISBN 978-0300211542
- Harold: Warrior King (2026), Yale University Press, ISBN 978-0300252958
