= Ælfwine of Elmham =

11th-century Bishop of Elmham

Ælfwine
- Bishop of Elmham
- Appointed: before 1019
- Term ended: between 1023 and 1038
- Predecessor: Ælfgar
- Successor: Ælfric II

Orders
- Consecration: before 1019

Personal details
- Died: 12 April between 1023 and 1038
- Denomination: Christian

Ælfwine was a medieval Bishop of Elmham.

Ælfwine was consecrated before 1019 and died on 12 April between 1023 and 1038.

Christian titles
Preceded by Ælfgar	Bishop of Elmham before 1019-c. 1030	Succeeded by Ælfric II
