= Eanfrith of Elmham =

8th-century Bishop of Elmham

Eanfrith
- Bishop of Elmham
- Appointed: before 758
- Term ended: after 758
- Predecessor: Æthelfrith
- Successor: Æthelwulf

Orders
- Consecration: before 758

Personal details
- Died: after 758
- Denomination: Christian

Eanfrith (or Lanferthus) (died after 758) was an Anglo-Saxon cleric who served as Bishop of Elmham.

Eanfrith was consecrated before 758.

Christian titles
Preceded by Æthelfrith	Bishop of Elmham before 758-after 758	Succeeded by Æthelwulf
