= Ælfgar of Elmham =

11th-century Bishop of Elmham

Ælfgar
- Bishop of Elmham
- Appointed: 1001
- Term ended: resigned between 1012 and 1016
- Predecessor: Æthelstan
- Successor: Ælfwine

Orders
- Consecration: 1001

Personal details
- Died: 24 or 25 December 1021
- Denomination: Christian

Ælfgar (died 24 or 25 December 1021) was an Anglo-Saxon cleric and bureaucrat who served as Bishop of Elmham.

== Ecclesiastical Career ==
Ælfgar was consecrated as a bishop in 1001. Prior to his appointment to the role of bishop, he served as a priest. In addition to his role as bishop, Ælfgar was active in politics; holding the title of ealdorman.

Two days prior to the death of Dunstan; the then-Archbishop of Canterbury, Ælfgar reportedly had a vision of Dunstan being surrounded and praised by angels. This event was used by William of Malmesbury as evidence of Ælfgar's holiness.

During his time as bishop, Ælfgar gained a reputation as a generous giver of alms.

Ælfgar was an important patron to Ely Abbey, and devoted much of his religious life to its upkeep. He is painted as a mural alongside several other religious figures of the time.

Ælfgar resigned as bishop at some point between 1012 and 1016.

== After retirement ==
Following his resignation as Bishop of Elmham, Ælfgar lived on the island of Ely in Cambridgeshire. While living in Ely he would oversee the burial of Eadnoth the Younger; who had been recently martyred at the Battle of Assandun by Danish invaders led by Cnut. While the group of Danish soldiers guarding Eadnoth's corpse were drunk following a visit to Ely Abbey, Ælfgar collaborated with the local monks in order to seize and hide Eadnoth's body. Following his burial, Eadnoth was venerated as a saint.

Ælfgar died on the morning of Christmas Day in 1021. He was buried in a field near the Ely Abbey.

Christian titles
Preceded by Æthelstan	Bishop of Elmham; 1001-1021	Succeeded by Ælfwine
