= The Glass of Truth =

Book by Henry VIII

The Glass of Truth is a book written in 1532 in support of Henry VIII of England in his desire to annul his marriage to his first wife, Catherine of Aragon. It is thought the book was written by Henry himself, or that he had a large hand in it, although the book was published anonymously. The Protestant priest John Frith countered the Pope's claim to be the head of the church with "Blessed be God that hath given some light into our prince's heart, for he hath lately put forth a book called The Glass of Truth which proveth many of these articles very foolish fantasies."
