= Eadwulf of Elmham =

10th-century Bishop of Elmham

Eadwulf
- Bishop of Elmham
- Appointed: before 955
- Term ended: after 966
- Predecessor: See Interrupted
- Successor: Ælfric I

Orders
- Consecration: before 955

Personal details
- Died: after 966
- Denomination: Christian

Eadwulf (Note: Or Atwulf) (died after 966) was an Anglo-Saxon cleric who served as Bishop of Elmham.

== Personal life ==
Eadwulf was a kinsman of another cleric named Cynehelm, who served as a priest.

== Ecclesiastical life ==
Eadwulf was consecrated at some point before 955.

Eadwulf became bishop during a tumultuous period of English history. Eadwulf was the first recorded bishop since the beginning of Danish rule in East Anglia, suggesting a lack of royal power in the region following the reign of Edward the Elder.

As bishop, Eadwulf was noted for his piety; being described as a "humble servant of Christ" during his episcopal profession. Eadwulf also displayed great obedience and devotion to Oda the Good, who was at that point Archbishop of Canterbury.

== Notes ==
Christian titles
Preceded by Aethelweald	Bishop of Elmham before 955-after 966	Succeeded by Ælfric I
