= See of Elmham =

See of the Anglo Saxon Church

The See of Elmham was an Anglo-Saxon episcopal see of the Anglo-Saxon Church. The precise location of the Sees of the Anglo-Saxon period are, as the historian James Campbell put it "thorny questions [which] have long vexed the learned." The presence of ancient remains at North Elmham in Norfolk, and South Elmham in Suffolk has led to both sites being championed as the location although neither has remains dating to the seventh century.
