= Theodred II (bishop of Elmham) =

10th-century Bishop of Elmham

- Bishop of Elmham
- Appointed: unknown
- Term ended: between 995 and 997
- Predecessor: Theodred I
- Successor: Æthelstan

Orders
- Consecration: unknown

Personal details
- Died: between 995 and 997
- Denomination: Christian

Theodred II was a medieval Bishop of Elmham.

The date of Theodred's consecration unknown, but the date of his death was sometime between 995 and 997.

Christian titles
Preceded by Theodred I	Bishop of Elmham unknown-c. 996	Succeeded by Æthelstan
