= Antony Bek (bishop of Norwich) =

14th-century Bishop of Lincoln-elect and Bishop of Norwich

- Bishop of Norwich
- Elected: 14 March 1337
- Term ended: 19 December 1343 (death)
- Predecessor: William Ayermin
- Successor: William Bateman
- Other post: Bishop of Lincoln-elect (1320)

Orders
- Consecration: 30 March 1337

Personal details
- Born: 1279
- Died: 19 December 1343
- Denomination: Roman Catholic

Antony Bek (also spelled Beck or Beke; 1279 – 19 December 1343) was a medieval Bishop of Norwich.

Bek was elected Bishop of Lincoln on 3 February 1320 but the election was quashed later in the year.

Bek was the chancellor and dean of Lincoln Cathedral and was nominated to Bishop of Norwich by the Pope on 14 March 1337 and consecrated on 30 March 1337. Bek was a quarrelsome man and, after a stormy and tyrannical episcopate, died on 19 December 1343, possibly poisoned by his own servants at the instigation of the monks. He was replaced by Bishop Bateman.

Bek is not to be confused with Antony Bek, Bishop of Durham and Latin patriarch of Jerusalem, his kinsman and namesake.

== Citations ==
Catholic Church titles
Preceded by John Dalderby	Bishop of Lincoln-elect; 1320	Succeeded by Henry Burghersh
Preceded by William Ayermin	Bishop of Norwich; 1337–1343	Succeeded by William Bateman
