= Ælfric III =

11th-century Bishop of Elmham

- Bishop of Elmham
- Appointed: 1039
- Term ended: between 1042 and 1043
- Predecessor: Ælfric II
- Successor: Stigand

Orders
- Consecration: 1039

Personal details
- Died: between 1042 and 1043
- Denomination: Christian

Ælfric III (Note: Old English: Ælfrīc) was a medieval Bishop of Elmham. He was consecrated in 1039 and died between 1042 and 1043.

== Notes ==
Christian titles
Preceded by Ælfric II	Bishop of Elmham; 1039-c. 1042	Succeeded by Stigand
