= Æthelstan (bishop of Elmham) =

10th-century Bishop of Elmham

Athelstan
- Bishop of Elmham
- Appointed: between 995 and 997
- Term ended: 7 October 1001
- Predecessor: Theodred II
- Successor: Ælfgar

Orders
- Consecration: between 995 and 997

Personal details
- Died: 7 October 1001
- Denomination: Christian

Æthelstan (or Athelstan) was a medieval Bishop of Elmham.

Athelstan was consecrated between 995 and 997 and died in office on 7 October 1001.

Christian titles
Preceded by Theodred II	Bishop of Elmham c. 996-1001	Succeeded by Ælfgar
