= Ælric (archbishop-elect of Canterbury) =

Ælric (fl. 1050), perhaps a misspelling of Ælfric or Æthelric, archbishop-elect of Canterbury, was a kinsman of Godwin, Earl of Wessex.

== Biography ==
According to the Vita Ædwardi Regis Ælric was brought up from early youth in the monastery of Christ Church at Canterbury, and was much beloved by his fellow monks. He was well skilled in worldly matters and took delight in them. On the death of Archbishop Eadsige (October 1050) Ælric was elected to the see of Canterbury by the monastic chapter of his house. In this election the clergy of the province seem to have concurred. The monks sent to Godwin, in whose earldom they were, and informed him of the canonical election of Ælric and begged him to use his influence in behalf of his kinsman. The earl promised to do all he could in the matter. King Edward was, however, at this time inclined to the faction which opposed the earl, and refused his request in behalf of Ælric. In the mid-Lent meeting of the witenagemot, in 1051, Robert of Jumièges was appointed archbishop, much to the anger of English churchmen.
