= Theodred (bishop) =

10th-century Bishop of Elmham

Theodred I
- Bishop of Elmham
- Appointed: before 974
- Term ended: unknown
- Predecessor: Ælfric I
- Successor: Theodred II

Orders
- Consecration: before 974

Personal details
- Died: unknown
- Denomination: Christian

Theodred was a medieval Bishop of Elmham.

He was consecrated before 974, however, his death or end of episcopate is not known.

Christian titles
Preceded by Ælfric I	Bishop of Elmham before 974-unknown	Succeeded by Theodred II
