= Herbert de Losinga =

11th and 12th-century Bishop of Norwich and Bishop of Thetford

- Bishop of Norwich
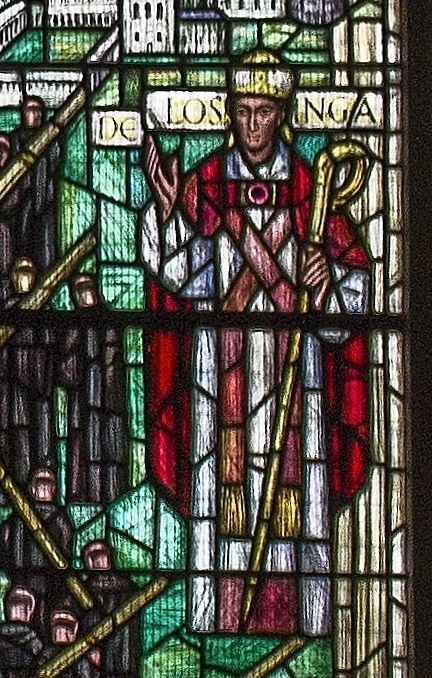
- Bauchon Window of Norwich Cathedral
- Province: Canterbury
- Installed: c. 1095
- Term ended: 22 July 1119
- Successor: Everard
- Previous posts: Bishop of Thetford; Abbot of Ramsey

Orders
- Consecration: 1090 or 1091

Personal details
- Born: Exmes, Normandy
- Died: 22 July 1119
- Denomination: Roman Catholic
- Parents: Robert de Losinga, Abbot of New Minster, Winchester

Herbert de Losinga (died 22 July 1119) was the first Bishop of Norwich. He founded Norwich Cathedral in 1096 when he was Bishop of Thetford.

== Life ==
Losinga was born in Exmes, near Argentan, Normandy, the son of Robert de Losinga (died June 1098)

Losinga was educated in Normandy, and took his vows at Fécamp Abbey in Normandy, of which he eventually became prior. While serving in this office he was invited to England by the king, William Rufus, who appointed him abbot of Ramsey Abbey.

Losinga was consecrated Bishop of Thetford in 1090 or 1091. He received the appointment having paid the king a sum of £1,900, as part of a deal in which Herbert's father was made Abbot of New Minster, Winchester. In 1094 he went to Rome to ask for forgiveness from Pope Urban for this act of simony. On his return he transferred the see from Thetford to Norwich, in accordance with the decree of Lanfranc's synod of 1075, that bishops should have their sees in the principal town of the diocese.

In addition to Norwich Cathedral, Losinga was responsible for founding St Margaret's Church in King's Lynn; the Church of St Nicholas in Great Yarmouth; and Norwich School.

Losinga visited Rome for a second time in 1116, representing the king in a dispute between the monarch and Anselm, the Archbishop of Canterbury. It may have been on the return journey that he fell severely ill at Placentia (modern Piacenza); other sources suggest he suffered this illness on a possible third journey to Rome, which he did not complete, instead awaiting his fellow ambassadors at Placentia, before returning to England with them.

One of Losinga's last public appearances was at the funeral of Queen Matilda on May Day 1118. He died on 22 July 1119 and was buried before the high altar of Norwich Cathedral.

Fourteen sermons and 57 letters written by Losinga have survived.

== Citations ==
Catholic Church titles
| Preceded by William de Beaufeu | Bishop of Thetford c. 1090–c. 1095 | see moved to Norwich |
| see moved from Thetford | Bishop of Norwich c. 1095–1119 | Succeeded by Everard |
