= Ælfric I =

10th-century Bishop of Elmham

- Bishop of Elmham
- Appointed: before 970
- Term ended: after 970
- Predecessor: Eadwulf
- Successor: Theodred I

Orders
- Consecration: before 970

Personal details
- Died: after 970
- Denomination: Christian

Ælfric (Note: Old English: Ælfrīc) was an Anglo-Saxon cleric who served as Bishop of Elmham.

Ælfric was consecrated before 970 and died sometime after that year.

== Notes ==
Christian titles
Preceded by Eadwulf	Bishop of Elmham before 970-after 970	Succeeded by Theodred I
