= Hunferthus =

9th-century Bishop of Elmham

- Bishop of Elmham
- In office: between 816 and 824
- Predecessor: Sybba
- Successor: Humbertus

Orders
- Consecration: between 816 and 824

Personal details
- Died: between 816 and 824
- Denomination: Christian

Hunferthus (Note: Or Hunferth or Hunfrith) was an Anglo-Saxon cleric who served as Bishop of Elmham.

Hunferthus was consecrated and died between 816 and 824.

== Notes ==
Christian titles
Preceded by Sybba	Bishop of Elmham c. 820	Succeeded by Humbertus
