= Æthelfrith of Elmham =

8th-century Bishop of Elmham

Æthelfrith
- Bishop of Elmham
- Appointed: 736
- Term ended: unknown, likely before 758
- Predecessor: Headulacus
- Successor: Eanfrith

Orders
- Consecration: 736

Personal details
- Died: after 736
- Denomination: Christian

Æthelfrith (Note: Or Eadilfridus or Aethelfrith) was a medieval Bishop of Elmham.

Æthelfrith was consecrated in 736 and died sometime after that year.

== Notes ==
Christian titles
| Preceded by Headulacus | Bishop of Elmham; 736-after 736 | Succeeded by Eanfrith |
