= William de Beaufeu =

11th-century Bishop of Thetford

- Bishop of Thetford
- Appointed: 25 December 1085
- Term ended: 1091
- Predecessor: Herfast
- Successor: Herbert de Losinga

Orders
- Consecration: 1086

Personal details
- Died: 1091
- Denomination: Catholic

William de Beaufeu (Note: Sometimes William de Beaufai, William of Bello Fargo or William of Belfou) (Note: The place where the name comes from is probably fr:Beaufour (Normandy, now Calvados département) : Belfou 1040 – 1066, Bellafagus 1195 "beautiful beech-tree", confused later with another place-name (Orne département) Beaufai : Belfai 1092, De Bello Fayaco ar. 1345 "beautiful beech wood") was a medieval Bishop of Thetford and a major landholder mentioned in the Domesday Book.

== Life ==
William's land holdings were mainly in the county of Norfolk and Suffolk. He was a royal clerk before he was nominated to the see of Thetford on 25 December 1085 and consecrated in 1086. He died in 1091. He was probably related to Richard de Beaufou Bishop of Avranches from 1134 to 1142.

== Citations ==
Catholic Church titles
Preceded by Herfast	Bishop of Thetford; 1085–1091	Succeeded by Herbert de Losinga
