= Bishop of Norwich =

Diocesan bishop in the Church of England

- Bishopric

anglican
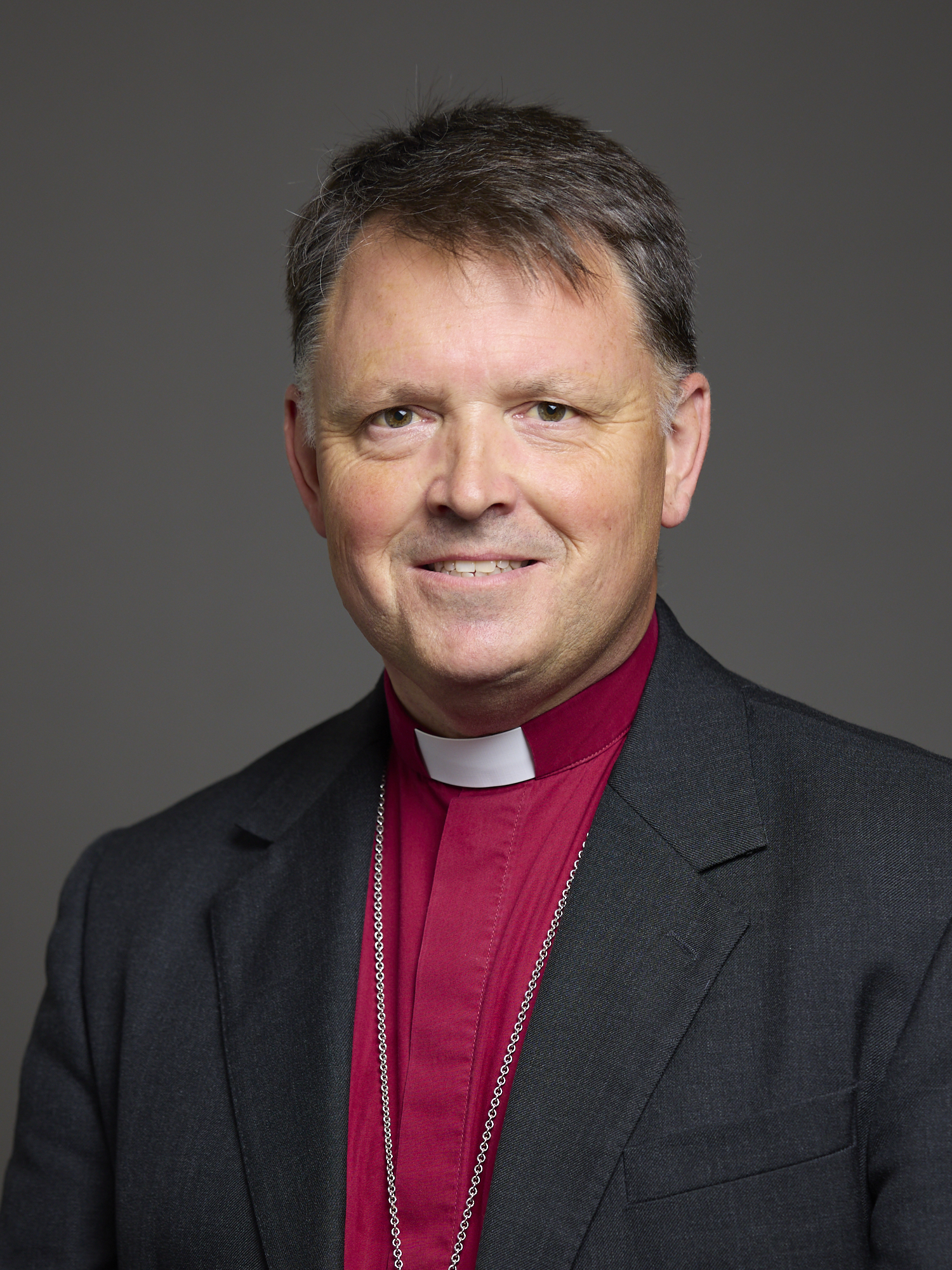
- Incumbent: Graham Usher

Location
- Ecclesiastical province: Canterbury
- Residence: Bishop's House, Norwich

Information
- First holder: Bedwinus; Herbert de Losinga (first bishop at Norwich)
- Established: 672; 1094 (translated to Norwich)
- Diocese: Norwich
- Cathedral: Norwich Cathedral (since 1094)

Arms of the See of Norwich: Azure, three mitres labelled or

The Bishop of Norwich is the ordinary of the Church of England Diocese of Norwich in the Province of Canterbury. The diocese covers most of the county of Norfolk and part of Suffolk. The bishop of Norwich is Graham Usher.

The see is in the city of Norwich and the seat is located at the Cathedral Church of the Holy and Undivided Trinity. The bishop's residence is Bishop's House, Norwich. It is claimed that the bishop is also the abbot of St Benet's Abbey, the contention being that instead of dissolving this monastic institution, Henry VIII united the position of abbot with that of bishop of Norwich, making St Benet's perhaps the only monastic institution to escape de jure dissolution, although it was despoiled by its last abbot.

East Anglia has had a bishopric since 630, when the first cathedral was founded at Dommoc, possibly to be identified as the submerged village of Dunwich. In 673, the see was divided into the bishoprics of Dunwich and Elmham; which were reunited by mid-950s, with the seat located at Elmham. After the Conquest the seat was moved in 1070 to Thetford, before finally being located in Norwich in 1094 under William II, ahead of the completion of the new cathedral building.

== History ==
The Anglo-Saxon dioceses before 925

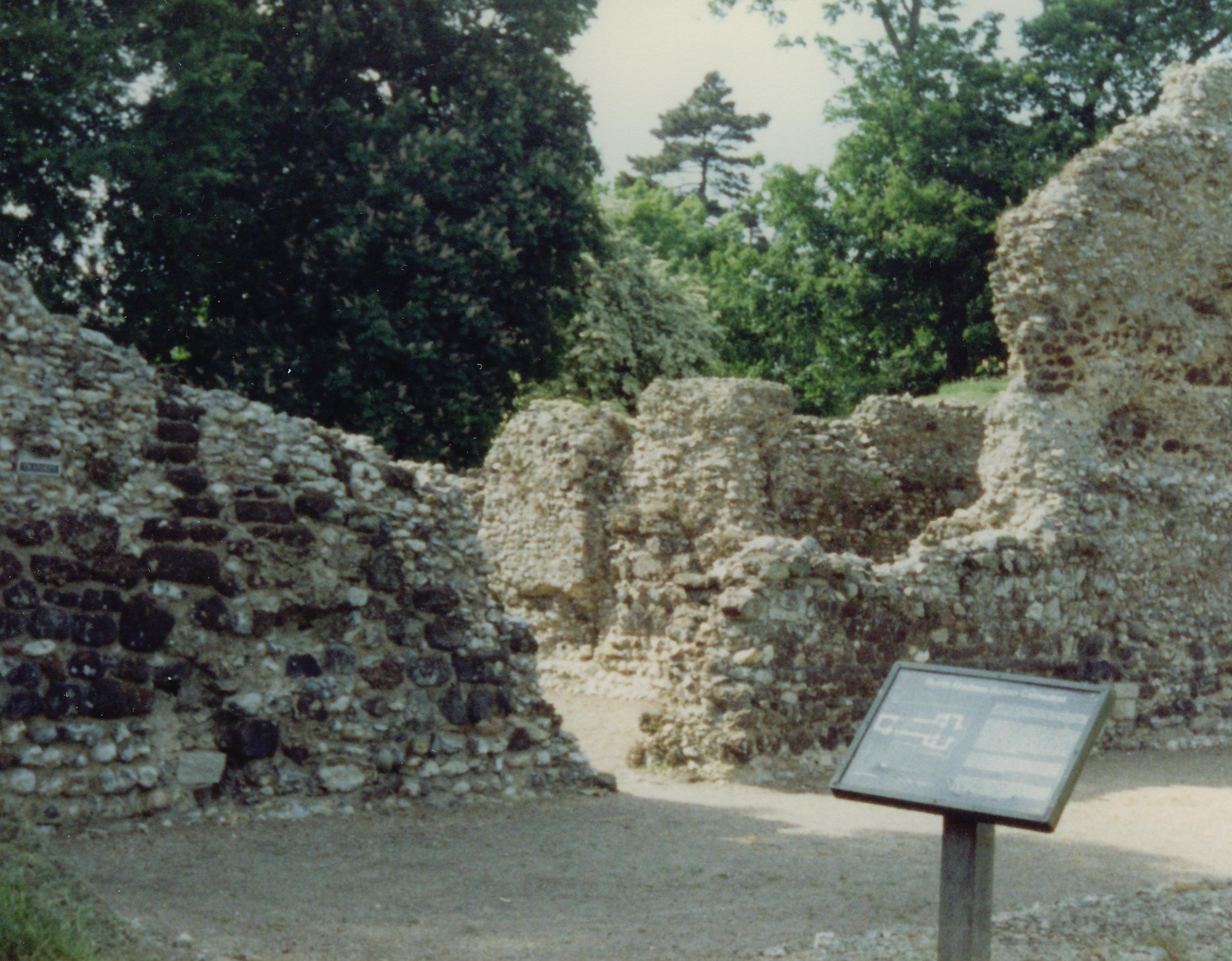
Remains of the Saxon cathedral at North Elmham

In about 630 or 631, a diocese was established by St. Felix for the Kingdom of the East Angles, with his episcopal seat at Dunwich on the Suffolk coast. In 672, the diocese was divided into the sees of Dunwich and Elmham by St. Theodore, Archbishop of Canterbury.

The line of bishops of Elmham continued until it was interrupted by the Danish Viking invasions in the late 9th and early 10th centuries. By the mid 950s, the sees of Elmham and Dunwich were reunited under one bishop, with the episcopal see at Elmham. After the Norman conquest, the see was transferred to Thetford in 1075, and soon afterwards to Norwich in 1094.

Though the see took the name Norwich in the 11th century, its history goes back 400 years earlier, to the final conversion of the kingdom of East Anglia by St Felix. The East Angles became Christian during the reign of Sigeberht, who succeeded to the kingdom in 628. Felix fixed his see at Dommoc, which may have been at Dunwich, now almost entirely submerged off the coast of Suffolk. From there he evangelized the areas corresponding to the modern counties of Norfolk, Suffolk and Cambridgeshire, which later were to form the diocese of Norwich. He was succeeded in turn by Thomas in 647, Brigilsus (died about 669) and Bifus. Upon the death of Bifus, in 673 Theodore, the Archbishop of Canterbury, divided the see between Dunwich and Elmham.

The see of Elmham came to an end in about 870, after the East Anglian king Edmund and the bishop Humbertus were murdered by the Danes. East Anglia was ravaged, the churches and monasteries destroyed, and Christianity was only practised with difficulty. Wilred, Bishop of Dunwich seems then to have reunited the dioceses, choosing Elmham as his see. The line of his successors at Elmham then descended to Herfast, a chaplain to William the Conqueror, who removed his see to Thetford Priory and died in 1084.

Herbert de Losinga obtained his appointment in 1091 by means of a simoniacal gift to King William Rufus to secure his election, but being subsequently struck with remorse went to Rome in 1094 to obtain absolution from the pope. Herbert founded a priory in Norwich in expiation for his sin and at the same time moved his see there from Thetford in 1094 under William. The See of Thetford was formed when Herfast moved the episcopal see from Elmham to Thetford in 1075. This short-lived see continued until it was moved to Norwich in 1094. The chapter of secular canons was dissolved and monks took their place. The foundation-stone of the new cathedral at Norwich was laid in 1096, in honour of the Blessed Trinity. By the time of his death in 1119, Herbert de Losinga had completed the choir, which is apsidal and encircled by a procession path, and which originally gave access to three Norman chapels. His successor, Everard, completed the long Norman nave so that the cathedral is a very early twelfth-century building, modified naturally by later additions and alterations. The chief of these is the Lady Chapel (c. 1250, destroyed by the Protestant Dean Gardiner 1573–1589); the cloisters (c. 1300), the West Window (c. 1440), the rood screen, the spire and the vault spanning the nave (c. 1450). The cathedral suffered much from iconoclasm during the Reformation and the civil wars.

The Norwich diocese consisted of Norfolk and Suffolk with some parts of Cambridgeshire, being divided into four archdeaconries: Norfolk, Norwich, Suffolk, and Sudbury. At the end of the seventeenth century there were 1,121 parish-churches, and this number had probably not changed much since Catholic times.

The main religious houses in the medieval diocese were the Benedictine Abbeys of Bury St Edmunds, Wymondham, and St Benet's of Hulme, the cathedral priory of Norwich, along with the Cistercian Abbey of Sibton, the only Cistercian Abbey in East Anglia (the ruins now privately owned by the Levett-Scrivener family), and the abbeys of the Augustinian Canons at Wendling, Langley, and Laystone. Both Dominican and Franciscan convents were to be found at Lynn, Norwich, Yarmouth, Dunwich, and Ipswich, while the Dominicans also had houses at Thetford and Sudbury and the Franciscans at Bury St Edmund's and at Walsingham, where the great shrine of Our Lady was, a foundation of Augustinian canons. The Carmelites were at Lynn, Norwich, Yarmouth, and Blakeney; and the Austin Friars at Norwich, Lynn, and Orford.

The last bishop before the start of the English Reformation was Richard Nykke (succeeded 1501), who was succeeded by William Rugg in 1536. After him came in 1550 Thomas Thirlby, who had already been appointed Bishop of Westminster by the King alone but was reconciled to the Pope in the reign of Queen Mary. After him in 1554 came John Hopton, the last Bishop of Norwich in communion with Rome, who died in 1558. In the early 17th century, Bishop Wren urged the restoration and beautification of churches, much previously neglected, and the use of copes in worship against a background of resistance. Several successors including Richard Montagu a public controversialist, continued attempts to restore a degree of catholic worship. However, Norwich was heavily influenced by Puritanism and in 1643, a Puritan mob invaded the cathedral and destroyed all Catholic symbols. (The bishop of the day, Joseph Hall, wrote despairingly of the despoliation, in his book, Hard Measures). Almost in ruins, the cathedral would be repaired at the Restoration.

== List of bishops of Norwich ==
=== Bishops at Elmham and at Thetford ===
Bishops of Elmham
| From | Until | Incumbent | Notes |
|---|---|---|---|
| 672 x ? | 693 x ? | Bedwinus | also recorded as Beaduwine |
| ? x 706 | 716 x ? | Northbertus | also recorded as Nothbeorht |
| ? x 716 | 716 x ? | Headulacus | also recorded as Heathulac |
| 736 | 736 x ? | Æthelfrith | also recorded as Eadilfridus, and Aethelfrith |
| ? x 758 | 758 x ? | Eanfrith | also recorded as Lanferthus |
| ? x 781 | 781 x ? | Æthelwulf | also recorded as Athelwolfus, and Aethelwulf of Elmham |
| ? x 785 | 805 x ? | Alherdus | also recorded as Alhheard |
| ? x 814 | 816 x ? | Sybba | also recorded as Sibba |
| 816 x 824 | 816 x 824 | Hunferthus | also recorded as Hunfrith |
| ? x 824 | 845/856 x ? or d. 869? | Humbertus | Episcopate ended in 845 or 856, or possibly died in November 869; also recorded as Hunberht and Humbryct |
| late 9th century | by mid 950s | The episcopal see was interrupted by the Danish Viking invasions. Afterwards, the sees of Elmham and Dunwich were reunited by the mid 950s under one bishop, with the see at Elmham | |
| 945 | 949 | Aethelweald | Ended by death |
| ? x 955 | 962 x ? | Eadwulf | |
| ? x 970 | 970 x ? | Ælfric I | |
| Before 974 | unknown | Theodred I | |
| unknown | Between 995 and 997 | Theodred II | Ended by death |
| 995 x 997 | 1001 | Æthelstan | Died 7 October 1001 |
| 1001 | 1012 x 1016 | Ælfgar | Possibly resigned between 1012 and 1016; died 24 or 25 December 1020 |
| Before 1019 | 1023 to 1038 | Ælfwine | Died 12 April between 1023 and 1038 |
| 1023 x 1038 | 1038 | Ælfric II | Died in December 1038 |
| 1039 | 1042 x 1043 | Ælfric III | |
| 1043 | 1043 | Stigand | Deprived in 1043 by Edward the Confessor |
| 1043 | 1043 | Grimketel | Deprived in 1043; also was Bishop of Selsey 1039–1047 |
| 1044 | 1047 | Stigand (again) | Restored by Edward; translated to Winchester in 1047, and later Canterbury |
| 1047 | 1070 | Æthelmær | Brother of Stigand; consecrated after August 1047; deposed by Papal legate c. 11 April 1070 |
| 1070 | 1075 | Herfast | Formerly Lord Chancellor; consecrated in 1070 as bishop of Elmham; transferred the see to Thetford in 1071 |
The episcopal see was transferred to Thetford in 1075, and subsequently to Norwich in 1094

Bishops of Thetford
| From | Until | Incumbent | Notes |
|---|---|---|---|
| 1075 | 1084 | Herfast | Transferred the see from Elmham in 1075; died 1084 |
| 1085 | 1091 | William de Beaufeu | Nominated 25 December 1085; died or resigned before 27 January 1091; also known as William de Beaufai |
| 1091 | 1094/95 | Herbert de Losinga | Previously Abbot of Ramsey; consecrated before 27 January 1091; became Bishop of Norwich in 1094 or 1095 |
In 1094 or 1095, the see of Thetford was moved to Norwich.

=== Pre-Reformation bishops ===
Pre-Reformation Bishops of Norwich
| From | Until | Incumbent | Notes |
|---|---|---|---|
| 1094 | 1119 | Herbert de Losinga | Elected and consecrated Bishop of Thetford in 1091. Transferred the see to Norwich in 1094. Died in office on 22 July 1119. |
| 1121 | 1145 | Everard of Calne | Also possibly known as Everard of Calne. Formerly Archdeacon of Salisbury. Elected bishop soon after 13 March 1121 and consecrated on 12 June 1121. Resigned in 1145 and died on 12 October 1146 |
| 1146/47 | 1174 | William de Turbeville | Also recorded as William Turbe. Formerly Prior of Norwich. Elected and consecrated in 1146 or early 1147. Died in office on 16 January 1174. |
| 1175 | 1200 | John of Oxford | Formerly Dean of Salisbury. Elected before 26 November 1175 and consecrated on 14 December 1175. Died in office on 2 June 1200. |
| 1200 | 1214 | John de Gray | Elected before 3 September 1200 and consecrated on 24 September 1200. Became Archbishop-elect of Canterbury in 1205, but was set aside by the pope in 1206. Continued bishop of Norwich until his death on 18 October 1214. |
| 1215 | 1226 | Pandulf Verraccio | Elected sometime between 18 July and 9 August 1215, but was not consecrated until 29 May 1222. Also was Papal legate to England (1218–1221). Died in office on 16 September 1226. |
| 1226 | 1236 | Thomas Blunville | Also recorded as Thomas de Blundeville. Formerly Clerk of the Exchequer. Elected in October 1226 and consecrated on 20 December 1226. Died in office on 16 August 1236. |
| 1236 | 1239 | Simon of Elmham (bishop-elect) | Elected after 9 November 1236, but quashed on 17 January 1239. |
| 1239 | 1243 | William de Raley | Also recorded as William Raleigh. Elected on 10 April 1239 and consecrated on 25 September 1239. Translated to Winchester in September 1243. |
| 1245 | 1257 | Walter Suffield | Also recorded as Walter de Suthfield, and Walter Calthorp. Elected before 9 July 1244 and consecrated on 26 February 1245. Died in office on 19 May 1257. |
| 1258 | 1266 | Simon Walton | Also recorded as Simon de Wanton. Elected on 4 June 1257 and consecrated on 10 March 1258. Died in office before January 1266. |
| 1266 | 1278 | Roger Skerning | Elected on 23 January 1266 and consecrated on 4 April 1266. Died in office on 22 January 1278. |
| 1278 | 1288 | William Middleton | Elected on 24 February 1278 and consecrated on 29 May 1278. Died in office on 31 August or 1 September 1288. |
| 1289 | 1299 | Ralph Walpole | Elected on 11 November 1288 and consecrated on 20 March 1289. Translated to Ely on 5 June 1299. |
| 1299 | 1325 | John Salmon | Appointed sometime between 5 and 18 June 1299 and consecrated on 15 November 1299. Died in office on 6 July 1325. |
| Jul 1325 | Sep 1325 | Robert Baldock (bishop-elect) | Elected on 23 July 1325, but without consecration resigned on 3 September 1325. |
| 1325 | 1336 | William Ayermin | Also recorded as William Ayermine. Appointed on 19 July 1325 and consecrated on 15 September 1325. Died in office on 27 March 1336. |
| 1336 | 1337 | Thomas Hemenhale (bishop-elect) | Elected on 6 April 1336, but before consecration translated to Worcester on 14 March 1337. |
| 1337 | 1343 | Antony Bek | Formerly Bishop-elect of Lincoln. Appointed on 14 March 1337 and consecrated on 30 March 1337. Died in office on 19 December 1343. |
| 1344 | 1355 | William Bateman | Appointed on 23 or 24 January 1344 and consecrated on 23 May 1344. Died in office on 6 January 1355. |
| 1356 | 1369 | Thomas Percy | Appointed on 4 February 1355 and consecrated on 3 January 1356. Died in office on 8 August 1369. |
| 1370 | 1406 | Henry le Despenser | Appointed on 3 April 1370 and consecrated on 14 August 1370. Died in office on 23 August 1406. |
| 1407 | 1413 | Alexander Tottington | Elected on 14 September 1406, appointed on 19 January 1407, and consecrated on 23 October 1407. Died in office before 20 April 1413. |
| 1413 | 1415 | Richard Courtenay | Elected before 28 June 1413 and appointed on that date, and consecrated on 17 September 1413. Died in office on 15 September 1415. |
| 1416 | 1425 | John Wakering | Also recorded as John Wakeryng. Elected before 24 November 1415 and consecrated on 31 May 1416. Died in office on 9 April 1425. |
| 1426 | 1436 | William Alnwick | Formerly Archdeacon of Salisbury. Appointed on 27 February 1426 and consecrated on 18 August 1426. Translated to Lincoln on 19 September 1436. |
| 1436 | 1445 | Thomas Brunce | Also known as Thomas Brouns, and sometimes incorrectly as Thomas Brown. Translated from Rochester. Appointed on 19 September 1436. Died in office on 6 December 1445. |
| 1446 | 1472 | Walter Hart | Also recorded as Walter Lyhert. Appointed on 24 January 1446 and consecrated on 27 February 1446. Died in office on 24 May 1472. |
| 1472 | 1499 | James Goldwell | Appointed on 17 July 1472 and consecrated on 4 October 1472. Died in office on 15 February 1499. |
| 1499 | 1500 | Thomas Jane | Appointed on 14 June 1499 and consecrated on 20 October 1499. Died in office in September 1500. |
| 1501 | 1535 | Richard Nykke | Also recorded as Richard Nix. Appointed on 26 February 1501 and consecrated on 6 June 1501. Died in office on 29 December 1535. |

=== Bishops during the Reformation ===
Bishops of Norwich during the Reformation
| From | Until | Incumbent | Notes |
|---|---|---|---|
| 1536 | 1550 | William Rugg | Also recorded as William Repps. Elected on 31 May 1536 and consecrated on 11 June 1536. Resigned before 26 January 1550 and died on 21 September 1550. |
| 1550 | 1554 | Thomas Thirlby | Translated from Westminster on 1 April 1550. Afterwards translated to Ely on 10 July 1554. |
| 1554 | 1558 | John Hopton | Nominated on 4 September 1554 and consecrated on 28 October 1554. Died in office after 24 August 1558. |

=== Post-Reformation bishops ===
Post-Reformation Bishops of Norwich
| From | Until | Incumbent | Notes |
|---|---|---|---|
| 1560 | 1575 | John Parkhurst | Nominated on 27 March 1560 and consecrated on 1 September 1560. Died in office on 2 February 1575. |
| 1575 | 1584 | Edmund Freke | Translated from Rochester. Nominated on 21 July 1575 and confirmed on 14 November 1575. Translated to Worcester on 5 December 1584. |
| 1585 | 1594 | Edmund Scambler | Translated from Peterborough. Elected on 15 December 1584 and confirmed on 15 January 1585. Died in office on 7 May 1594. |
| 1594 | 1602 | William Redman | Elected on 17 December 1594 and consecrated on 12 January 1595. Died in office on 25 September 1602. |
| 1603 | 1618 | John Jegon | Nominated on 10 January 1603 and consecrated on 20 February 1603. Died in office on 13 March 1618. |
| 1618 | 1619 | John Overall | Translated from Lichfield. Nominated on 9 May 1618 and confirmed on 30 September 1618. Died in office on 12 May 1619. |
| 1619 | 1629 | Samuel Harsnett | Translated from Chichester. Nominated on 1 June 1619 and confirmed on 28 August 1619. Translated to York on 13 January 1629. |
| 1628 | 1631 | Francis White | Translated from Carlisle. Elected on 22 January 1629 and confirmed on 9 February 1629. Translated to Ely on 8 December 1631. |
| 1632 | 1635 | Richard Corbet | Translated from Oxford. Elected on 7 April 1632 and confirmed on 7 May 1632. Died in office on 28 July 1635. |
| 1635 | 1638 | Matthew Wren | Translated from Hereford. Elected 10 November 1635 and confirmed on 5 December 1635. Translated to Ely on 24 April 1638. |
| 1638 | 1641 | Richard Montagu | Translated from Chichester. Nominated on 1 May 1638 and confirmed on 12 May 1638. Died in office on 13 April 1641. |
| 1641 | 1646 | Joseph Hall | Translated from Exeter. Elected on 15 November 1641 and confirmed on 16 December 1641. Deprived when the episcopate was abolished by Parliament on 9 October 1646. Died on 8 September 1656. |
| 1646 | 1660 | The see was abolished during the Commonwealth and the Protectorate. | |
| 1661 | 1676 | Edward Reynolds | Nominated on 30 September 1660 and consecrated on 13 January 1661. Died in office on 28 July 1676. |
| 1676 | 1685 | Anthony Sparrow | Translated from Exeter. Elected on 28 August 1676 and confirmed on 18 May 1676. Died in office on 18 May 1685. |
| 1685 | 1690 | William Lloyd | Translated from Peterborough. Elected on 11 June 1685 and confirmed on 4 July 1685. Deprived on 1 February 1690 and died on 1 January 1710. |
| 1691 | 1707 | John Moore | Nominated on 25 April 1691 and consecrated on 5 July 1691. Translated to Ely on 31 July 1707. |
| 1708 | 1721 | Charles Trimnell | Nominated on 13 January 1708 and consecrated on 8 February 1708. Translated to Winchester on 19 August 1721. |
| 1721 | 1723 | Thomas Green | Nominated on 19 August 1721 and consecrated on 8 October 1721. Translated to Ely on 24 September 1723. |
| 1723 | 1727 | John Leng | Nominated on 27 August 1723 and consecrated on 3 November 1723. Died in office on 26 October 1727. |
| 1727 | 1732 | William Baker | Translated from Bangor. Nominated on 2 November 1727 and confirmed on 19 December 1727. Died in office on 4 December 1732. |
| 1733 | 1738 | Robert Butts | Nominated on 17 January 1733 and consecrated on 25 February 1733. Translated to Ely on 27 June 1738. |
| 1738 | 1748 | Thomas Gooch | Translated from Bristol. Nominated on 29 August 1738 and confirmed on 17 October 1738. Translated to Ely on 11 March 1748. |
| 1748 | 1749 | Samuel Lisle | Translated from St Asaph. Nominated on 17 March 1748 and confirmed on 9 April 1748. Died in office on 3 October 1749. |
| 1749 | 1761 | Thomas Hayter | Nominated on 13 October 1749 and consecrated on 3 December 1749. Translated to London on 24 October 1761. |
| 1761 | 1783 | Philip Yonge | Translated from Bristol. Nominated on 27 October 1761 and confirmed on 25 November 1761. Died in office on 23 April 1783. |
| 1783 | 1790 | Lewis Bagot | Translated from Bristol. Nominated on 15 May 1783 and confirmed on 14 June 1783. Translated to St Asaph on 24 April 1790. |
| 1790 | 1792 | George Horne | Nominated on 7 May 1790 and consecrated on 6 June 1790. Died in office on 17 January 1792. |
| 1792 | 1805 | Charles Manners-Sutton | Nominated on 5 February 1792 and consecrated on 8 April 1792. Translated to Canterbury on 21 February 1805. |
| 1805 | 1837 | Henry Bathurst | Nominated on 5 March 1805 and consecrated on 28 April 1805. Died in office on 5 April 1837. |
| 1837 | 1849 | Edward Stanley | Nominated on 14 April 1837 and consecrated on 11 June 1837. Died in office on 6 September 1849. |
| 1849 | 1857 | Samuel Hinds | Nominated on 26 September 1849 and consecrated on 2 December 1849. Resigned in 1857 and died on 7 February 1872. |
| 1857 | 1893 | John Pelham | Nominated on 5 May 1857 and consecrated on 11 June 1857. Retired on 16 May 1893 and died on 1 May 1894. |
| 1893 | 1910 | John Sheepshanks | Nominated on 26 May 1893 and consecrated on 29 June 1893. Retired on 19 February 1910 and died on 3 June 1912. |
| 1910 | 1942 | Bertram Pollock | Nominated on 19 February 1910 and consecrated on 25 April 1910. Retired on 24 June 1942 and died on 17 October 1943. |
| 1942 | 1959 | Percy Herbert | Translated from Blackburn. Nominated on 1 July 1942 and confirmed on 22 July 1942. Retired on 25 July 1959 and died on 22 January 1968. |
| 1959 | 1971 | Launcelot Fleming | Translated from Portsmouth. Nominated on 23 October 1959 and confirmed on 18 December 1959. Resigned on 30 June 1971 and appointed Dean of Windsor (1971–1976). Died on 30 July 1990. |
| 1971 | 1985 | Maurice Wood | Nominated on 12 July 1971 and consecrated on 29 September 1971. Retired on 26 August 1985 and died on 24 June 2007. |
| 1985 | 1999 | Peter Nott | Translated from Taunton. Nominated and confirmed in 1985. Retired in 1999. |
| 1999 | 2019 | Graham James | Translated from St Germans. Nominated in 1999 and enthroned on 29 January 2000. Retired on 28 February 2019. |
| 2019 | 2019 | Alan Winton, Bishop of Thetford | Acting bishop during vacancy in See |
| 2019 | present | Graham Usher | Translated from Dudley, 17 June 2019. |

== Assistant bishops ==
Among those who have served the diocese as assistant bishops have been:

- 1450–1477: Thomas Scrope, absentee (or former) Bishop of Dromore and assistant Bishop of Canterbury in 1469. Consecrated 1 February 1450, by Angelo Capranica, Archbishop of Ascoli Piceno, at Santa Maria in Aquiro. Also called Thomas (de) Bradley for his Leicestershire birthplace; Carmelite friar; vicar-general to the bishop of Norwich; died 1491/2 — allegedly aged 100 — in Lowestoft, where he was buried.
- 1931 – 1951 (d.): Edwin Robins, Vicar of Wicklewood (until 1947) and former bishop of Athabasca
- 1953–1955: Wilfrid Belcher, Rector of Diss and former Bishop of North Queensland

== Port-passing etiquette ==
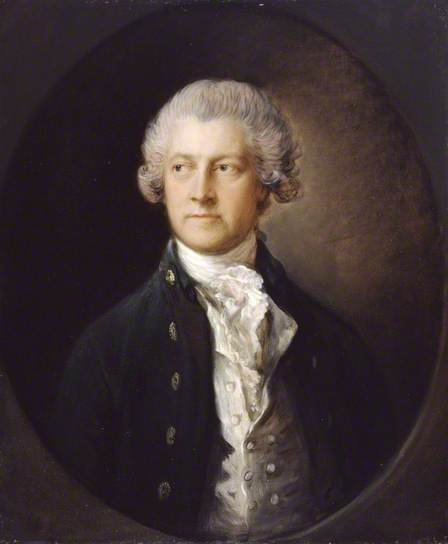
Lewis Bagot (1740–1802), Bishop of Norwich who once failed to pass the port.

When port wine is passed around at British meals, one tradition dictates that a diner passes the decanter to the left immediately after pouring a glass for his or her neighbour on the right; the decanter should not stop its clockwise progress around the table until it is finished. If someone is seen to have failed to follow tradition, the breach is brought to their attention by asking "Do you know the Bishop of Norwich?"; those aware of the tradition treat the question as a reminder, while those who do not are told "He's a terribly good chap, but he always forgets to pass the port."

It is unclear which, if any, Bishop of Norwich was the inspiration for this custom. Several candidates have been put forward but decisive contemporary evidence is wanting for all of them.

1) Lewis Bagot, who supposedly 'hogged' the port at a dinner at Christ's College, Cambridge.

2) Henry Bathurst, who used to fall asleep during meals and hence was unable to pass the port. He was still bishop in his 90s.

3) John Sheepshanks. He is sometimes put forward as a candidate but with even less justification than the other two.
