= Council of Winchester (1072) =

Former Catholic Church administrative body

The Council of Winchester was a church council held in April 1072 at Winchester. It attempted to settle the question of the primacy of the Archbishop of Canterbury over the English Church.

When Lanfranc became Archbishop of Canterbury, he found that Thomas of Bayeux (the Archbishop of York) believed that York was independent of Canterbury; this was the beginning of the Canterbury-York dispute. The case was decided in favour of Canterbury. During the council, Lanfranc used papal authority to remove and replace some of the English bishops and abbots.

The council's decision was accepted by the Catholic Church but not by the Archbishop of York. It resulted in the Accord of Winchester when the question was further heard at Windsor.
