= Canterbury–York dispute =

Medieval dispute between Archbishops of Canterbury and York

The Canterbury–York dispute was a long-running conflict between the archdioceses of Canterbury and York in medieval England. It began shortly after the Norman Conquest of England and dragged on for many years. The main point of the dispute was over whether Canterbury would have jurisdiction, or primacy, over York. A number of archbishops of Canterbury attempted to secure professions of obedience from successive archbishops of York, but in the end they were unsuccessful. York fought the primacy by appealing to the kings of England as well as the papacy. In 1127, the dispute over the primacy was settled mainly in York's favour, for they did not have to submit to Canterbury. Later aspects of the dispute dealt with concerns over status and prestige.

== Nature of the dispute ==
The main locus of the dispute was the attempt by post-Norman Conquest Archbishops of Canterbury to assert their primacy, or right to rule, over the province of York. Canterbury used texts to back up their claims, including Bede's major historical work the Historia ecclesiastica gentis Anglorum, which sometimes had the Canterbury archbishops claiming primacy over not just York, but the entire ecclesiastical hierarchy of the British Isles. It began under Lanfranc, the first Norman Archbishop of Canterbury, and ended up becoming a neverending dispute between the two sees over prestige and status. The historian David Carpenter says Lanfranc's actions "sucked his successors into a quagmire, and actually weakened rather than strengthened church discipline and the unity of the kingdom." Carpenter further argues that "it became impossible in later centuries, thanks to disputes over status, for the two archbishops to appear in each others presence."

Feeding into the dispute were the two cathedral chapters, who encouraged their respective archbishops to continue the struggle. An additional element was that Canterbury had a monastic chapter, while York had secular clergy in the form of canons, interjecting a note of secular and monastic clerical rivalries into the dispute. Another problem that intertwined with the dispute was the investiture controversy in England, which was concurrent with the dispute and involved most of the same protagonists. The kings of England, who might have forced a decision, were more concerned with other matters, and were ambivalent about Canterbury's claims, which removed a potential way to resolve the dispute. At times, kings supported Canterbury's claims in order to keep the north of England from revolting, but this was balanced by the times that the kings were in quarrels with Canterbury.

The popes, who were often called upon to decide the issue, had their own concerns with granting a primacy, and did not wish to actually rule in Canterbury's favour. But the main driving forces behind the Canterbury position were Lanfranc and Anselm of Canterbury, both of whom enjoyed immense prestige in the church and thus it was not easy for the papacy to rule against them or their position. Once Anselm was out of office, however, the popes began to side more often with York, and generally strived to avoid making any final judgement.

== Under the Norman kings ==
=== Under Lanfranc ===
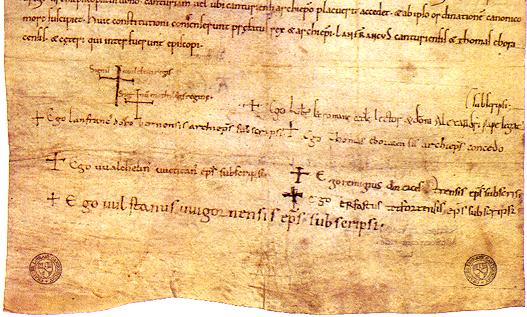
The bottom of the Accord of Winchester, showing Lanfranc's signature.

The dispute began under Lanfranc, who demanded oaths of obedience from not just the traditional suffragan bishops of Canterbury but also from the archbishop of York. This happened shortly after Lanfranc's own consecration, when King William I of England then proposed that Lanfranc consecrate the new archbishop of York, Thomas of Bayeux. Lanfranc demanded that Thomas swear to obey Lanfranc as Thomas' primate before the consecration could take place, and Thomas refused, but he eventually gave way, and made a profession. However, the exact form that this oath took was disputed, with Canterbury claiming it was without conditions, and York claiming that it was only a personal submission to Lanfranc, and did not involve the actual offices of Canterbury and York. When both Thomas and Lanfranc visited Rome in 1071, Thomas brought up the primacy issue again, and for good measure tacked on a claim to three of Canterbury's suffragan dioceses, Lichfield, Dorchester, and Worcester. Pope Alexander II sent the issue back to England, to be settled at a council convened by the papal legate. This council took place at Winchester in April 1072, and Lanfranc was victorious on both the primacy issue as well as the dioceses. The victory was drawn up in the Accord of Winchester, to which those present affixed their names. However, papal confirmation of the decision did not extend to Lanfranc's successors, and in fact was never a complete confirmation of the rulings of the council. Lanfranc enjoyed the support of King William I at this council. Thomas was compensated with authority over the Scottish bishops, which was an attempt to give York enough suffragans to allow the archbishops of York to be consecrated without the help of Canterbury. An archiepiscopal consecration required three bishops, and after York's claims to Lichfield, Dorchester, and Worcester were denied, York only had one suffragan, the Diocese of Durham.

Why exactly Lanfranc decided to press forward claims to a judicial primacy over York is unclear. Some historians, including Frank Barlow have speculated that it was because Thomas was a disciple of Odo of Bayeux, one of Lanfranc's rivals in the English church. Another possibility was that Lanfranc desired to assert authority over the northern province of Britain in order to aid the reforming efforts Lanfranc was attempting. Lanfranc was surely influenced by his cathedral chapter at Canterbury, who may have desired to recover their honours after the problems encountered in Lanfranc's predecessor Stigand's archiepiscopate. York had never had a primacy, and based its arguments on the general principle that primacies were erroneous. While Canterbury in the Anglo-Saxon era had been more prestigious than York, it had never in fact had a judicial primacy. Another influence was probably Lanfranc's monastic background, with Lanfranc feeling that the ecclesiastical structure should mirror the monastic absolute obedience to a superior. However, a main influence was probably the so-called False Decretals, a collection of decrees and canons from the ninth century, which mentioned primates as the equivalent of patriarchs and placed them between the pope and the metropolitan bishops in the hierarchy.

When Lanfranc attempted to find documentary proof to rebut York's refusal, it was discovered that no explicit statement of such a primacy existed. This involved the use of letters of Pope Gregory the Great, which were repeated in Bede's Historia, but a complication was that Gregory's plan for the Gregorian mission had specified that the southern province would be based at London, not Canterbury. There was documentary evidence from the papacy that stated that Canterbury had a primacy over the island, but these dated from before York had been raised to an archbishopric. During the Council of Winchester in 1072, papal letters were produced which may or may not have been forgeries. A biographer of Lanfranc, Margaret Gibson, argues that they already existed before Lanfranc used them. Another historian, Richard Southern, holds that the statements relating to primacy were inserted into legitimate papal letters after Lanfranc's day. Most historians agree that Lanfranc did not have anything to do with the forgeries, however they came about.

King William I supported Lanfranc in this dispute, probably because he felt that it was important that his kingdom be represented by one ecclesiastical province, and this would best be accomplished by supporting the primacy of Canterbury. Before conquering England, William had ruled the duchy of Normandy, which corresponded to the archdiocese of Rouen, and the simplicity of control which this allowed the dukes of Normandy probably was a strong factor in William's support of Canterbury's claims. Another concern was that in 1070–1072, the north of England, where York was located, was still imperfectly pacified, and allowing York independence might lead to York crowning another king.

Thomas claimed that when Lanfranc died in 1089, Thomas' profession lapsed, and during the long vacancy at Canterbury that followed on Lanfranc's death, Thomas performed most of the archiepiscopal functions in England.

=== Under Anselm ===
When Anselm was appointed to Canterbury, after a long vacancy that lasted from 1089 to 1093, the only flareup of the dispute was a dispute at Anselm's consecration on 4 December 1093 over the exact title that would be employed in the ceremony. The dispute centered on the title that would be confirmed on Anselm, and although it was settled quickly, the exact title used is unknown, as the two main sources of information differ. Eadmer, Anselm's biographer and a Canterbury partisan, proclaims that the title agreed upon was "Primate of all Britain". Hugh the Chanter, a chronicler from York and a partisan of York, claims the title used was "Metropolitan of Canterbury". Until the ascension of King Henry I in 1100, Anselm was much more occupied with other disputes with King William II.

It was during Anselm's archiepiscopate that the primacy dispute became central to Anselm's plans. Eadmer made the dispute central to his work, the Historia Novorum. Likewise, Hugh the Chanter, made the primacy dispute one of the central themes of his work History of the Church of York.

In 1102, Pope Paschal II, in the midst of the Investiture controversy, tried to smooth over the problems about investiture by granting Anselm a primacy, but only to Anselm himself, not to his successors. Nor did the grant explicitly mention York as being subject to Canterbury. Anselm then held a council in September 1102 at Westminster, which was attended by Gerard, the new archbishop of York. According to Hugh the Chanter, when the seats for the bishops were arranged, Anselm's was set higher than Gerard's, which led Gerard to kick over chairs and refuse to be seated until his own chair was exactly as high as Anselm's. Late in 1102, the pope wrote to Gerard, admonishing him and ordering him to make the oath to Anselm.

Gerard died in May 1108, and his successor was nominated within six days. Thomas, however, delayed going to Canterbury to be consecrated, under pressure from his cathedral chapter and knowing that since Anselm was in poor health, he might be able to outlast Anselm. Thomas told Anselm that his cathedral chapter had forbidden him to make any oath of obedience, and this was confirmed by the canons themselves, who wrote to Anselm confirming Thomas' account. Although Anselm died before Thomas' had submitted, one of the last letters Anselm wrote ordered Thomas not to seek consecration until he had made the required profession. After Anselm's death, the king then pressured Thomas to submit a written profession, which he eventually did. The actual document has disappeared, and as always, Eadmer and Hugh the Chanter disagree on the exact wording, with Eadmer claiming it was made to Canterbury and any successor archbishops, and Hugh claiming that Thomas qualified the oath by making it clear that it could not impede the rights of the Church of York.

=== Dispute under Thurstan ===
During the archbishopric of Thurstan, the Archbishop of York between 1114 and 1140, the dispute flared up and Thurstan appealed to the papacy over the issue, with Canterbury under Ralph d'Escures countering with information from Bede as well as forged documents. The papacy did not necessarily believe the forgeries, but the dispute rumbled on for a number of years. Shortly after Thurstan's election in 1114, Ralph refused to consecrate Thurstan unless Ralph received a written, not just oral, profession of obedience. Thurstan refused to do so, and assured his cathedral chapter that he would not submit to Canterbury. York based its claim on the fact that no metropolitan bishop or archbishop could swear allegiance to anyone but the pope, a position guaranteed to gain support from the papacy. King Henry, however, refused permission for Thurstan to appeal to the papacy, which left the dispute in limbo for two years. Henry does not seem to have cared about who won the dispute, and Henry may have delayed hoping that Ralph and Thurstan would reach a compromise which would keep Henry from having to alienate either of them.

Pressure mounted, however, and Henry called a council in the spring of 1116, and Henry ordered that when Thurstan arrived at the council, he must swear to obey Canterbury. If Thurstan would not do so, Henry threatened to depose him from office. But, on his way to the council, Thurstan received a letter from the pope, ordering Thurstan's consecration without any profession. Although Thurstan did not reveal that the pope had ordered his consecration, he continued to refuse to make a profession, and resigned his see in the presence of the king and the council. But, the papacy, the York cathedral chapter, and even King Henry still considered Thurstan the archbishop-elect. In 1117, Ralph attempted to visit Pope Paschal II about the dispute, but was unable to actually meet the pope, and only secured a vague letter confirming Canterbury's past privileges, but since the exact privileges weren't specified, the letter was useless.

Both Ralph and Thurstan attended the Council of Reims in 1119, convened by Pope Calixtus II in October. Although Canterbury sources state that Thurstan promised King Henry he would refuse consecration while at the council, Yorkish sources deny that any such promise was made. Calixtus promptly consecrated Thurstan at the start of the council, which angered Henry and led the king to exile Thurstan from England and Normandy. Although the pope and king met and negotiated Thurstan's status in November 1119, nothing came of this, and Calixtus in March 1120 gave Thurstan two papal bulls, one an exemption for York from Canterbury's claims, titled Caritatis Bonun, (Note: The original of the document is lost, because of this there has been some concern that the document as it survives might not be authentic, but several historians, including Martin Brett and Mary Cheney have put forth arguments that it is.) and the other a threat of interdict on England if Thurstan was not allowed to return to York. After some diplomatic efforts, Thurstan was allowed back into the king's favour and his office returned to him. Calixtus' bulls also allowed any future Archbishops of York to be consecrated by their suffragans if the Archbishop of Canterbury refused.

In 1123, William of Corbeil, recently elected Archbishop of Canterbury, refused consecration by Thurstan unless Thurstan would incorporate into the ceremony an admission that Canterbury was primate of Britain. When Thurstan refused, William was consecrated by three of his own bishops. William then traveled to Rome to secure confirmation of his election, which was disputed. Thurstan also traveled to Rome, as both archbishops had been summoned to attend a papal council, which both arrived too late to attend. Thurstan arrived shortly before William. While there, William and his advisors presented documents to the papal curia which they insisted proved Canterbury's primacy. However, the cardinals and the curia found the documents to be forgeries. What persuaded the cardinals was the absence of papal bulls from the nine documents produced, which the Canterbury delegation tried to explain away by saying the bulls had "wasted away or were lost". Hugh the Chanter, a medieval chronicler of York, stated that when the cardinals heard that explanation, they laughed and ridiculed the documents "saying how miraculous it was that lead should waste away or be lost and parchment should survive". (Note: Papal bulls are made of lead and are attached to a papal communication. They bear a seal impression.) Hugh goes on to record that the attempts by the Canterbury party to secure their objective by bribery likewise failed. (Note: That the documents produced in 1123 were forgeries is not doubted by modern historians, but they differ on the exact date they were produced. The historian Richard W. Southern argued that they were forged shortly after the granting of Caritatis Bonun in 1120.)

Pope Honorius II made a judgment in York's favour in 1126, having found the documents and case presented by Canterbury to be unconvincing. In the winter of 1126–1127, an attempt at compromise was made, with Canterbury agreeing to give jurisdiction over the sees of Chester, Bangor and St Asaph to York in return for the submission of York to Canterbury. This foundered when William of Corbeil arrived at Rome and told the pope that he had not agreed to the surrender of St Asaph. This was the last attempt by William to secure an oath from Thurstan, for a compromise in the primacy dispute was made, with William of Corbeil receiving a papal legateship, which effectively gave him the powers of the primacy without the papacy actually having to concede a primacy to Canterbury. This legateship covered not only England, but Scotland as well.

A small flare-up in 1127 happened when William of Corbeil objected to Thurstan having his episcopal cross carried in processions in front of Thurstan while Thurstan was in Canterbury's province. William also objected to Thurstan participating in the ceremonial crownings of the king at the royal court. Thurstan appealed to Rome, and Honorius wrote a scathing letter to William declaring that if the reports from Thurstan were true, William would be punished for his actions. Thurstan then traveled to Rome, where he secured new rulings from the papacy. One gave the seniority between the two British archbishops to whichever had been consecrated first. Another ruling allowed the Archbishops of York to have their crosses carried in Canterbury's province.

=== Legacy of the first dispute ===
The main import of the first dispute was the increase in appeals to the papacy to solve the problem. This was part of a general trend to seek support and resolution at the papacy instead of in the royal courts, a trend that grew through the reigns of William II and Henry I. Also important was the impetus that the disputes gave to efforts by both York and Canterbury to assert their jurisdiction over Scotland, Wales and Ireland. After the settlement of the profession issue, the dispute turned to other, lesser matters such as how the respective chairs of the two archbishops would be arranged when they were together and the right of either to carry their episcopal cross in the others' province.

== Under Stephen ==
Under Stephen, the dispute arose briefly at the Council of Reims of 1148. Theobald of Bec, who was Archbishop of Canterbury for most of Stephen's reign, attended the council, and when Henry Murdac, just recently elected to York, did not arrive, Theobald claimed the primacy over York at one of the early council sessions. However, as Murdac was a Cistercian, as was Pope Eugene III, who had called the council, nothing further was done about Canterbury's claim. Eugene postponed any decision until Murdac was established in his see.

Most of the time, however, Theobald was not concerned with reopening the dispute, as demonstrated when he consecrated Roger de Pont L'Evêque, newly elected to York in 1154. Theobald, at Roger's request, performed the consecration as papal legate, and not as archbishop, thus side-stepping the question of a profession of obedience.

== Disputes under Henry II ==
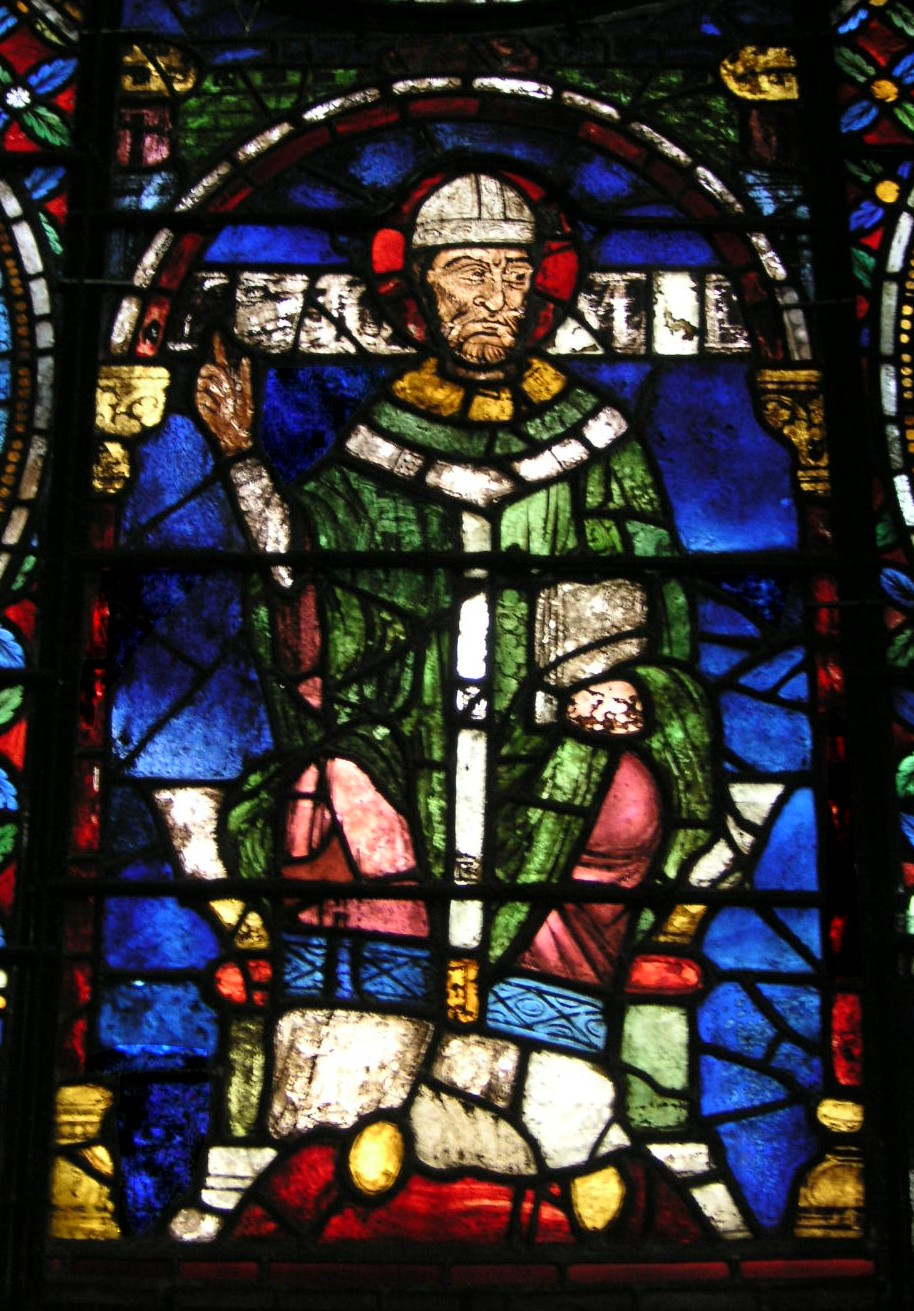
A medieval stained glass window depicting Thomas Becket.

During Thomas Becket's archiepiscopate, the dispute flared up again, with the added complication of an attempt by Gilbert Foliot, the Bishop of London, to have his see raised to an archbishopric, basing his case on the old Gregorian plan for London to be the seat of the southern province. Foliot was an opponent of Becket's, and this fed into the dispute, as well as Becket's legateships, which specifically excluded York. When Roger de Pont L'Evêque, the Archbishop of York, crowned Henry the Young King in 1170, this was a furthering of the dispute, as it was Canterbury's privilege to crown the kings of England.

The first sign of the revival of the dispute was at the Council of Tours, called in 1163 by Pope Alexander III. While there, Roger and Becket disputed over the placement of their seats in the council. Roger argued, that based on Gregory the Great's plan that primacy should go to the archbishop who had been consecrated first, he had the right to the more honourable placement at the council. Eventually, Alexander placed them both on equal terms, but not before the council spent three days listening to the claims and counter-claims, as well as Roger relating the whole history of the dispute. In 1164 Alexander gave Roger a papal legateship, but excluded Becket from its jurisdiction. The pope did, however, decline to declare that Canterbury had a primacy in England. Alexander on 8 April 1166 confirmed Canterbury's primacy, but this became less important than the grant of a legateship on 24 April to Becket. This grant, though, did not cover the diocese of York, which was specifically prohibited.

During the reign of Henry II, the dispute took a new form, concerning the right of either archbishop to carry their archiepiscopal cross throughout the kingdom, not just in their own province. During the vacancy between the death of Theobald of Bec and the appointment of Becket, Roger had secured papal permission to carry his cross anywhere in England. As the Becket controversy grew, however, Alexander asked Roger to forbear from doing so, in order to stop the wrangling that had arisen from Roger's doing so. Later, Alexander revoked the privilege, claiming it had been given in error.

== Disputes under Richard I ==
The dispute continued between Hubert Walter and Geoffrey, respectively Archbishop of Canterbury and Archbishop of York, during the reign of Richard I of England, when both archbishops had their archiepiscopal crosses carried before themselves in the others diocese, prompting angry recriminations. Eventually, both prelates attempted to secure a settlement from Richard in their favour, but Richard declined, stating that this was an issue that needed to be settled by the papacy. However, no firm settlement was made until the 14th century.

== Role of the papacy ==
The papacy, while continuing to grant legateships to the archbishops of Canterbury, began after 1162 to specifically exclude the legateships from covering the province of York. The only exception from the later half of the 12th century was the legateship of Hubert Walter in 1195, which covered all of England. This exception, however, was more due to Pope Celestine III's dislike of Geoffrey, the archbishop of York at the time.
