= Ranulf Flambard =

Bishop of Durham and royal official (c. 1060 – 1128)

- Bishop of Durham
- Appointed: May 1099
- Predecessor: William de St-Calais
- Successor: Geoffrey Rufus

Orders
- Consecration: 5 June 1099

Personal details
- Born: c. 1060
- Died: 5 September 1128
- Buried: Durham Cathedral in the chapter house

Ranulf Flambard (Note: Sometimes known as Ralph Flambard, Ranulph Flambard, or Ranulf Passiflamme.) (c. 1060 – 5 September 1128) was a medieval Norman Bishop of Durham and an influential government official of King William Rufus of England. Ranulf was the son of a priest of Bayeux, Normandy, and his nickname Flambard means incendiary or torch-bearer, and may have referred to his personality. He started his career under King William I of England, probably in the compilation of the Domesday Book of 1086, as well as being the keeper of the king's seal. On the death of William I, Ranulf chose to serve the new king of England, William Rufus.

Under Rufus, Ranulf continued to hold the king's seal and also became involved in the financial administration of the kingdom, where he quickly made a name for himself by his novel methods of raising revenue. He was given custody of a number of vacant ecclesiastical offices, administering at one point sixteen vacant bishoprics or abbeys. His many duties have led to him being considered the first Chief Justiciar of England. During Rufus's reign, Ranulf supervised the construction of the first stone bridge in London and oversaw the construction of the king's hall at Westminster. In 1099, he was rewarded with the bishopric of Durham.

On the death of Rufus in 1100, Ranulf was imprisoned in the Tower of London by Rufus' successor Henry I of England. Ranulf was a convenient scapegoat for the financial extortions of Rufus's reign. He became the first prisoner to escape from the Tower and went into exile in Normandy with Rufus's and Henry's older brother Robert Curthose, the Duke of Normandy. Ranulf became a leading advisor to Robert and assisted in his unsuccessful invasion of England, an attempt to oust Henry from the throne. The brothers reconciled, but although Ranulf was restored to office, he spent the next few years in Normandy, returning only after Henry had defeated Robert at the Battle of Tinchebray. Ranulf subsequently retired from political life, with only occasional appearances in public. He remained active in ecclesiastical affairs, attending councils and working to defend the rights of his see.

== Early life ==
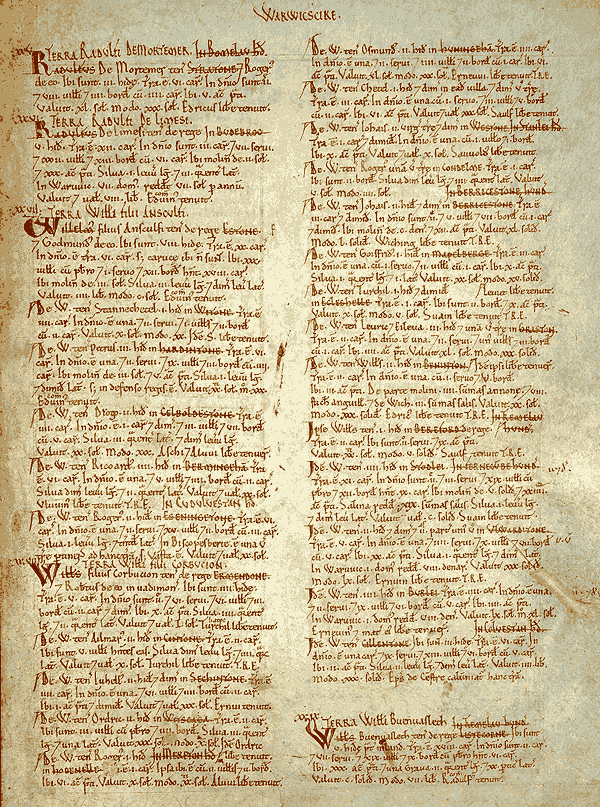
A page from Domesday Book, which Ranulf was involved with

Ranulf was a Norman and the son of Thurstin, a parish priest in the diocese of Bayeux. Ranulf was probably born about 1060, as he was close to 70 when he died in 1128. Originally, he worked for Odo of Bayeux, but he soon entered the chancery of King William I, Odo's half-brother. He stood out amongst the other clerks for his intelligence and his good looks. His nickname, Flambard, means torch-bearer, incendiary or devouring flame; and may have been given to him for his high-spirited personality. Orderic Vitalis, a medieval chronicler, records that Robert fitzThurstin gave the nickname to Ranulf, because Robert resented the fact that Ranulf, though of low birth, ordered the nobility around. Archbishop Anselm of Canterbury told the pope that the nickname came from Ranulf's cruelty, which Anselm likened to a consuming flame. Orderic went on to claim that Ranulf was "educated from boyhood with base parasites among the hangers-on of the court".

Ranulf acquired the reputation of an able financier and administrator and helped to increase the royal revenues. He appears to have played an important part in the compilation of the Domesday survey, perhaps even the main orchestrator of the project. Domesday Book gives his profession as a clerk and records him holding land in a number of counties. Before the death of the old king, he became chaplain to Maurice, Bishop of London, whom he had formerly served in the chancery. Some sources call him "almost illiterate", but this probably meant he was not formally educated in the liberal arts. His work in the chancery and as an administrator would have required knowledge of Latin. He also served as the keeper of the king's seal from about 1085. Once, while he was travelling in the Thames estuary with the seal, he was captured by pirates. He prevented the capture of the seal by throwing it into the sea. Although he served William the Conqueror, he does not attest a single genuine charter or writ of William's, which implies he was not a leading servant. When King William died, and his lands were split between his elder son Robert Curthose, who received Normandy, and the third son, William Rufus, (Note: The second son, Richard, had died about 1075 without children.) who received England, Ranulf chose to serve Rufus in England.

== Work under Rufus ==
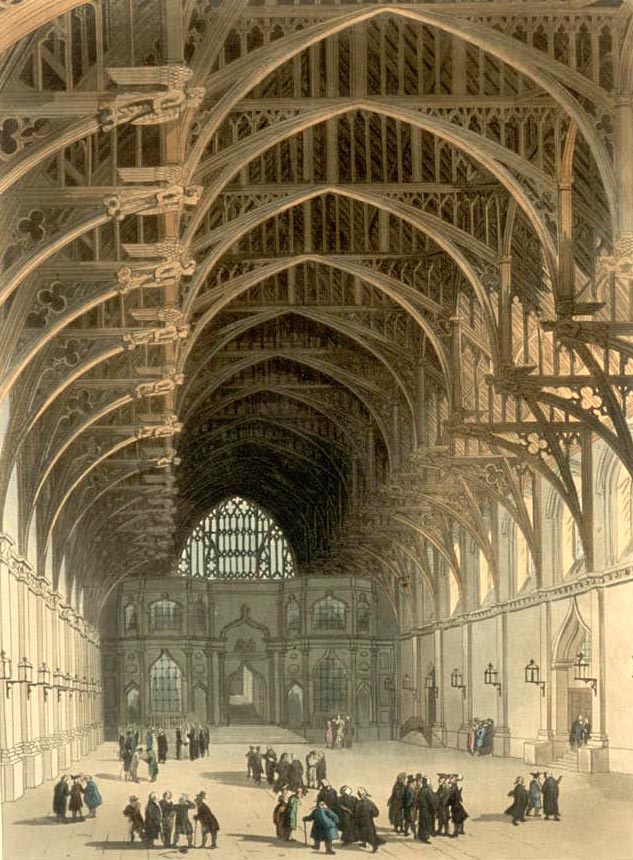
A drawing of the interior of Westminster Hall by Augustus Pugin (architecture) and Thomas Rowlandson (figures), dating from about 1808. The walls date to Ranulf's construction work at the site.

Before the death of William the Conqueror, Ranulf held a prebend in the diocese of Salisbury. Early in the reign of Rufus he held the offices of dean of Christchurch in Twynham, Hampshire and was a prebendary of London and Lincoln. He was still keeper of the king's seal, and also may have been in charge of the royal scriptorium. He is usually described as the chaplain of Rufus, but he is also called treasurer and sometimes capitalis justicaiarius. Other times his role is given the title procurator. William of Malmesbury calls him the "manager of the whole kingdom".

At Christchurch, Ranulf reduced the number of canons serving the church from 25 to 13 by not replacing clerks who died. Ranulf kept the revenues that would have gone to the missing canons and used them to rebuild the church. Some medieval sources claim that in rebuilding the church at Twynham, he not only demolished the church he was replacing but nine others that were nearby.

As chief financial administrator, Ranulf bore the brunt of the chronicler's condemnations for extortion and efforts to increase royal revenues. Besides attempts to increase the efficiency of collection and the rate of taxation, Ranulf created new methods of raising money. One of his new measures in revenue collection came in 1094, when the fyrd, or English militia, was assembled to fight in Normandy against the king's brother Robert Curthose. When all the men had assembled, instead of sending them to Normandy, Ranulf dismissed them, after collecting the 10 shillings that each man had been given by their district for maintenance. Ranulf then spent the money on mercenaries. Ranulf also actively pressed lawsuits, including bringing suit against Anselm on the day of Anselm's consecration as Archbishop of Canterbury. Another innovation was the attempt to collect a relief, much like the relief due from vassals at the death of an overlord, from the under-tenants of church lands when the church office changed hands. This attempt came at the death of Wulfstan, Bishop of Worcester in 1095, when the king sent writs to the free tenants of the bishop, setting the amount of relief owed to the king. This attempt was not repeated, however.

Ranulf administered for the king a large proportion of the vacant ecclesiastical offices. He personally managed sixteen abbeys or bishoprics. (Note: Among which were Chertsey, Canterbury, and New Minster.) Eventually, he obtained the wealthy see of Durham for himself in May 1099, being consecrated on 5 June 1099. He had been the custodian of the see since the death of the previous bishop in early 1096. At his consecration, he managed to avoid giving a profession of obedience to Thomas, the Archbishop of York, just as his predecessor had done. William of Malmesbury, a medieval chronicler, accused Ranulf of paying 1,000 pounds for the bishopric. He was given ecclesiastical jurisdiction over Carlisle and Cumbria because his predecessors had done so as bishops of Lindisfarne, but he only exercised this for a short time, as after the accession of Henry I, jurisdiction over these areas was transferred to the diocese of York.

It has been suggested that Ranulf may have been the first Justiciar of all England (or chief justiciar), although he never held the title and it is not clear if his power was as extensive as Roger of Salisbury in the following reign. He ran the government of England while Rufus was fighting in Normandy, not only raising money, but issuing writs and judging court cases. William of Malmesbury, in describing Ranulf's financial efforts, said that he "skinned the rich, ground the down the poor, and swept other men's inheritances into his net." Orderic said that Ranulf planned to revise the survey of England, almost certainly Domesday Book, and that he planned to use that revised survey to confiscate all excess holdings over a certain amount. If this was really planned, it was never carried out.

Ranulf often worked in concert with Haimo, the dapifer, or seneschal, and Urse d'Abetot in carrying out royal judgements. On one occasion, they, along with Robert Bloet, the Bishop of Lincoln, reassessed the lands of Thorney Abbey for taxes. On another occasion, they were ordered along with Ralph de Luffa Bishop of Chichester to see that the abbey of Fecamp received custody of a church at Steyning. Others who often worked with Ranulf were Robert FitzHaimo, Roger Bigod, and Eudo the dapifer. These men are sometimes considered by historians to be the first Barons of the Exchequer. There are also signs during Ranulf's administration of resident justices in the counties who held courts for the king. Itinerant justices were probably also used to hear pleas that were reserved to the crown.

While administering England for Rufus, Ranulf also supervised construction projects. Under his management, the first stone bridge in London was constructed. Ranulf also built a wall around the White Tower in London, enclosing the inner ward. A new hall at Westminster was also built, of which the outside walls of Westminster Hall are still surviving. He started building the church at Christchurch at Twynham, which he had been granted by Rufus. After Rufus' death, the church was confiscated from Ranulf, and building work ceased. The crypts and transepts of the current church, however, date from Ranulf's construction work.

== Under Henry I ==
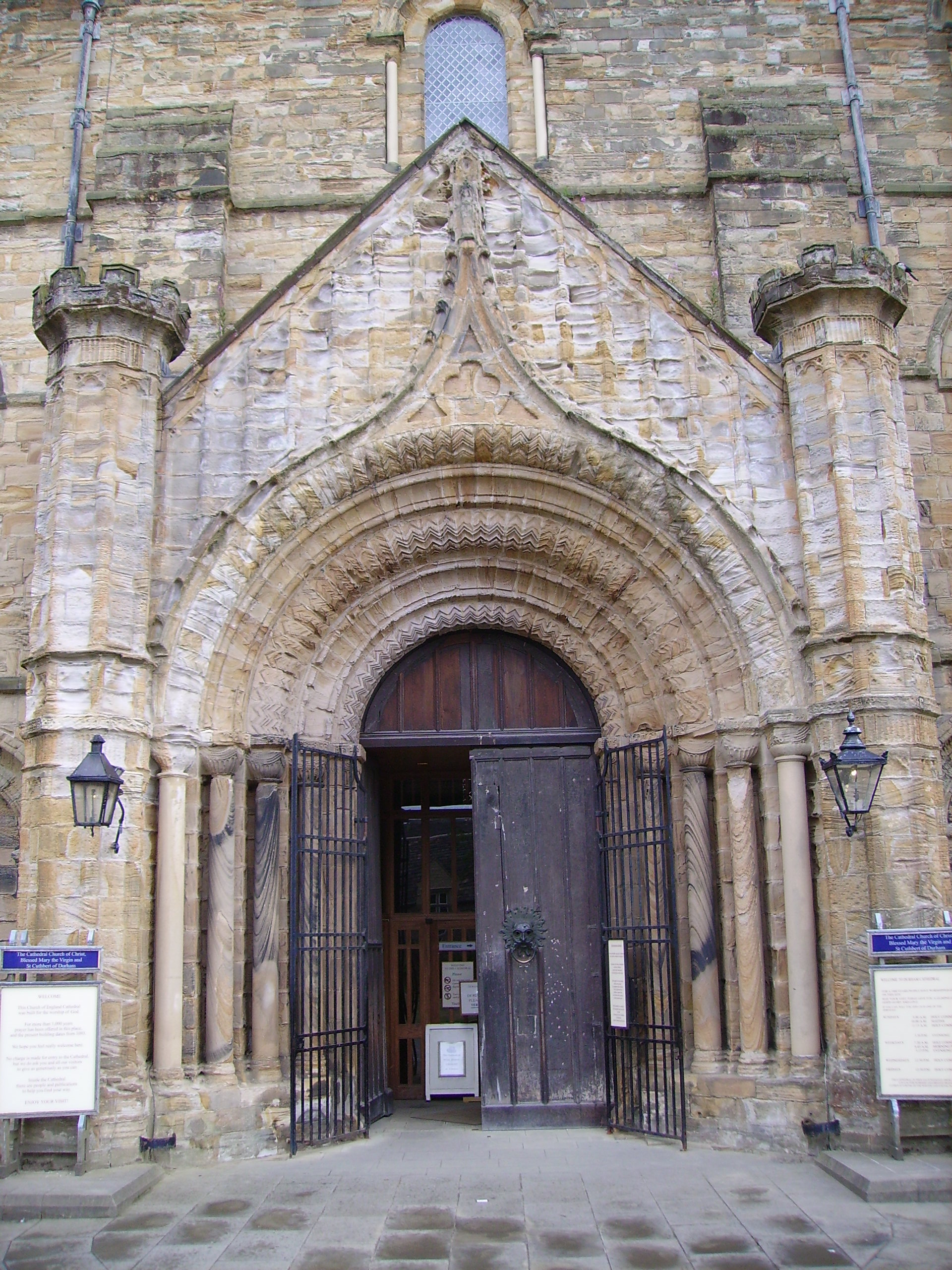
Entrance to Durham Cathedral

At the succession of King Henry I, the new king imprisoned Ranulf in the Tower of London on 15 August 1100 on charges of embezzlement. His custodian, William de Mandeville, allowed the bishop to escape on 3 February 1101. Flambard was not only the first inmate at the castle, but also the first person to escape from it. According to Orderic, friends smuggled to Ranulf a rope in a flagon of wine, he gave the drink to his guards, and after they were drunk and asleep, climbed down the rope to escape. His friends had arranged a ship to transport Ranulf, some of the bishop's treasure, and the bishop's elderly mother to Normandy. He took refuge across the English Channel with Henry's brother Robert Curthose, where he became one of the duke's principal advisors. King Henry dispossessed Ranulf of his lands at Whitsun in 1101, and the new Archbishop of York Gerard deposed him from his bishopric. The Archbishop of Canterbury, Anselm arranged for Flambard's trial in a papal court for simony, and a papal decree was issued against Ranulf.

As Robert's advisor, Ranulf pressed the duke to dispute Henry's claim to the crown of England. The historian David Crouch says that Ranulf "had to provide the strategic vision and energy that Duke Robert lacked", and other historians have agreed that Ranulf's arrival was the catalyst to Curthose's ability to mount an invasion. Ranulf was in charge of organising transport for the duke's invasion of England, and also secured the defection of some of Henry's ships, thus allowing the fleet to land safely. Robert invaded England in July 1101 along with Ranulf, but Robert agreed at the Treaty of Alton on 2 August 1101 to renounce his claim to the English throne. Although no chronicler mentions Ranulf being present at Alton, he probably was there. Ranulf was pardoned in the treaty and restored to his bishopric, but he chose to stay with Robert for five more years. Some historians, including C. W. Hollister, see the treaty as mainly Ranulf's work, as mainly an attempt to salvage his ecclesiastical career in England, along with a displacement of Ranulf from being the chief councillor of Curthose to merely being one of many.

Robert rewarded Ranulf for his advice during the invasion by entrusting him with the administration of the see of Lisieux. After Robert's defeat by Henry at Tinchebray in 1106, the bishop was among the first to make his peace with Henry, and returned to Durham. He retired from political life. Henry had already replaced him with Roger of Salisbury, an able financier who was infinitely more acceptable to the nation. Although some historians have theorised that Ranulf's time in Normandy was as an agent of Henry, it appears that Ranulf was mainly looking out for his own interests and those of his family.

In 1108, Ranulf was dragged into the middle of the ongoing dispute between Archbishop Anselm and the newly appointed Archbishop of York, Thomas, over whether or not Thomas should profess obedience to Anselm. Because Anselm refused to consecrate Thomas without a profession, and Thomas refused to profess, Thomas was unable to consecrate bishops himself. Ranulf wrote to Anselm, asking that he might act as Thomas' surrogate and consecrate Thurgot as Bishop of St Andrew's. In September 1108, Anselm wrote to Ranulf forbidding anyone but Thomas or Anselm himself to consecrate Thurgot or any other bishops. Later, Ranulf tried to bribe King Henry to take Thomas' side. Thurgot had been prior of the cathedral chapter at Durham, but had disagreed with Ranulf, who arranged for him to be elected to St Andrew's as a solution to the quarrel.

It was Ranulf who ordained Thurstan, the archbishop-elect of York, as a priest in 1115, although Thurstan had to wait for consecration as bishop for another four years. (Note: Thurstan also refused to profess obedience to the Archbishop of Canterbury, who was now Ralph d'Escures.) Ranulf attended the Council of Reims in 1119 held by Pope Callixtus II. In 1125 John of Crema, the papal legate to England, visited Durham to investigate charges against the bishop. Medieval chroniclers told the story that the legate was much taken with Ranulf's niece, and after sleeping with the girl, took no action on the charges against Ranulf. The story is unlikely to be true.

== Death and legacy ==
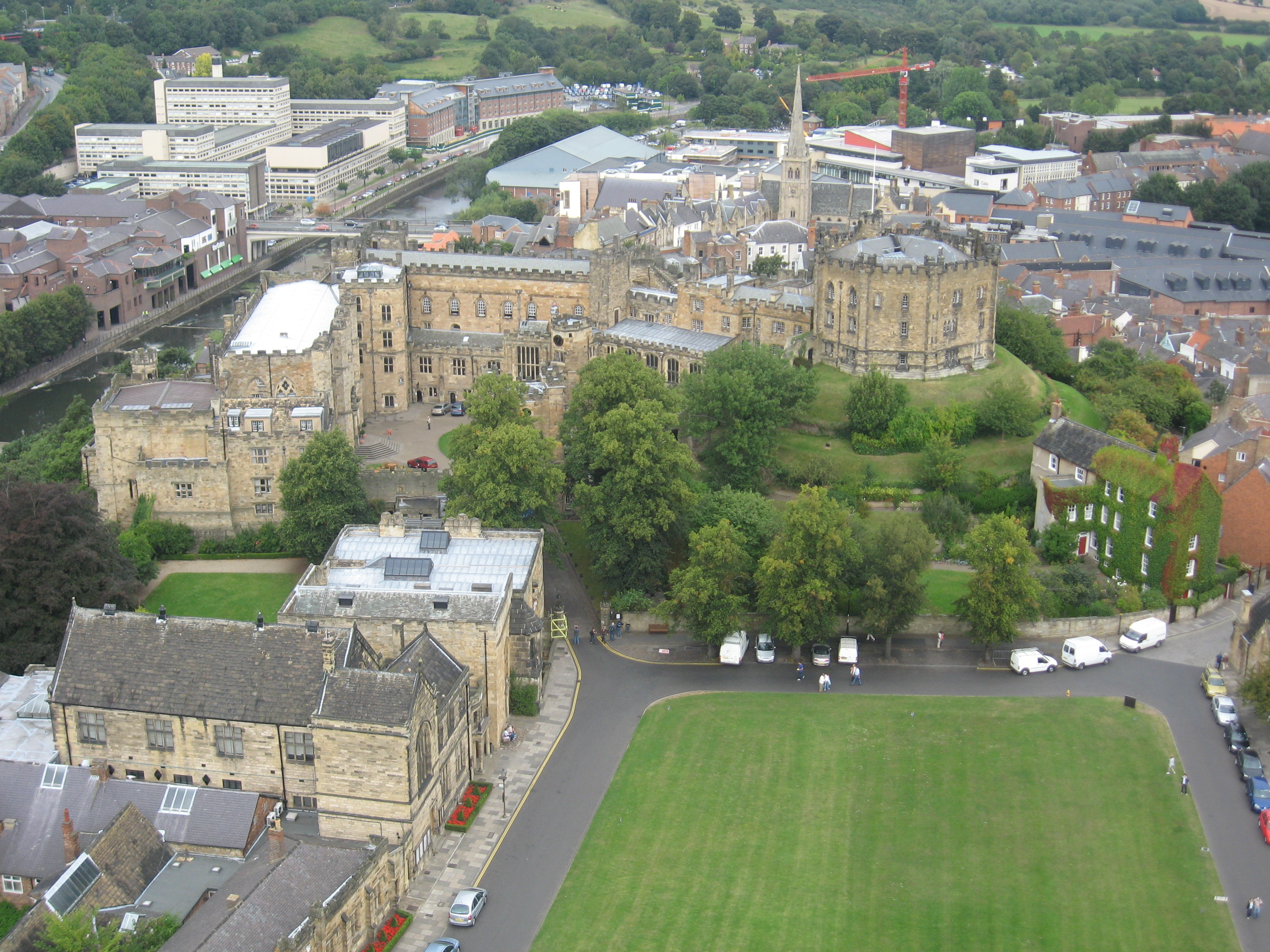
Modern view from Durham Cathedral looking towards Durham Castle across Palace Green

Ranulf worked to complete Durham Cathedral which his predecessor, William de St-Calais, had begun; fortified Durham with a wall around Durham Castle, built Norham Castle to help defend the Tweed River; (Note: This was probably a timber and earth castle and was rebuilt in stone by Hugh de Puiset, a later bishop.) and endowed the collegiate church of Christchurch, Hampshire. He built or expanded other churches, including the one at Christchurch in Hampshire which he had endowed, and St. Martin's in Dover. The first stone bridge at Durham was completed by his instruction in 1120, the so-called Framwellgate Bridge, a bridge described as "of wonderful workmanship." He cleared and levelled the Palace Green in Durham between the castle and the cathedral. While the chroniclers mainly condemned Ranulf for his morals, his own cathedral chapter held him in high esteem because of his building activities and his defence of the rights of Durham. Although he usurped some of the income of the cathedral chapter, the money from those rights was used to complete the cathedral rebuilding, and later restored the income to the monks as well as increasing the endowment. At his death, the cathedral walls were complete up to "the covering", which probably means the vault instead of the roof.

Ranulf attracted scholars to his household and reformed the administration of the diocese by dividing it into archdeaconries. Ranulf oversaw the translation of Cuthbert of Lindisfarne's relics to a new tomb in a lavish ceremony. He was also a patron to the hermit Godric of Finchale, whom he befriended.

One of Ranulf's brothers was Fulcher, who was Bishop of Lisieux in 1101. (Note: Fulcher's name has sometimes been given as William.) Another brother was Osbern, who was a royal clerk for Rufus, and the last brother was Geoffrey. Fulcher may have been appointed bishop to enable Ranulf to exploit the see while Ranulf was in exile in Normandy. Ranulf had a son, Thomas of Lisieux, who also held the see of Lisieux, right after his uncle. Like his uncle, he may have been appointed as a placeholder to allow his father to appropriate the revenues of Lisieux. Ranulf's mistress was an Englishwoman named Alveva or Ælfgifu, who was the mother of at least two of his sons. Alveva's sons were Ranulf, who was an archdeacon, and Elias. When Ranulf became bishop, he married her to a burgess of Huntingdon, but remained on good terms with both Alveva and her spouse, often staying with them when he travelled away from Durham. Alveva was the aunt of Christina of Markyate, and Christina is said to have rebuffed the bishop's attempts to seduce her in 1114. Alveva and Ranulf's son Elias held a prebend at London and was a royal clerk under Henry I. Ranulf's son Ralf was parson of Middleham and held a prebend at London too. He was a member of Archbishop Theobald of Canterbury's household after 1138. Some of Ranulf's sons were educated at Laon under William de Corbeil, who was one of Ranulf's clerks. One of Ranulf's nephews, Ralf, was archdeacon of Northumberland and during the reign of King Stephen helped to hold the diocese of Durham loyal to Stephen. Other nephews were Osbert, who was sheriff of Durham, and Robert, Richard, and William, who held fiefs. Unrelated to Ranulf, William of Corbeil became one of Ranulf's household clerks and was eventually elected Archbishop of Canterbury in 1123.

Ranulf died on 5 September 1128. He was buried in his chapter house in Durham, where his tomb was opened in 1874. His skeleton is still extant, and examination of it reveals that he would have been about 5 ft 9 in (1.75 m) tall. He was fond of clothes and was always richly dressed. While he was efficient in collecting the royal revenues, he was generous to his own men and, later in life, gave liberally to the poor. His crozier and signet ring were found in his grave, and they were rather plain. An oddity of his grave was that he was buried on top of a layer of charcoal that was laid over alternating layers of lime and dirt.

Ranulf's reputation has suffered because of the hostility of the monastic chroniclers to both himself and to Rufus. Many chroniclers decried his financial ruthlessness and his lax morals. Orderic described Ranulf's career as "addicted to feasts and carousals and lusts; cruel and ambitious, prodigal to his own adherents, but rapacious in seizing the goods of other men". Besides the chroniclers, Archbishop Anselm of Canterbury wrote to Pope Paschal II, while Ranulf was in exile, describing Ranulf as "a rent collector of the worst possible reputation." William of Malmesbury said that Flambard was a "plunderer of the rich, destroyer of the poor". Victorian historians, including E. A. Freeman, vilified Ranulf, and Freeman especially held that Ranulf was a "malignant genius". Modern historians have embraced a more moderate view, starting with Richard Southern in 1933. The historian David Bates felt that he, along with his successor Roger of Salisbury, "were essentially the chief managers of the king's finance and justice".

== Citations ==
Catholic Church titles
Preceded by William de St-Calais	Bishop of Durham; 1099–1128	Succeeded by Geoffrey Rufus
