= Robert Bloet =

Chancellor of England and Bishop of Lincoln (died 1123)

- Bishop of Lincoln
- Appointed: March 1093
- Term ended: 10 January 1123
- Predecessor: Remigius de Fécamp
- Successor: Alexander

Orders
- Consecration: before 22 February 1094

Personal details
- Died: 10 January 1123 Woodstock, Oxfordshire, England, United Kingdom

Lord Chancellor
- In office 1092–1093
- Monarch: William II
- Preceded by: Gerard
- Succeeded by: William Giffard

Robert Bloet (sometimes Robert Bloett; died 1123) was Bishop of Lincoln from 1093–1123 and Chancellor of England. Born into a noble Norman family, he became a royal clerk under King William I. Under William I's son and successor King William II, Bloet was first named chancellor then appointed to the See of Lincoln. Continuing to serve the king while bishop, Bloet remained a close royal councillor to William II's successor, King Henry I. He did much to embellish Lincoln Cathedral, and gave generously to his cathedral and other religious houses. He educated a number of noblemen, including illegitimate children of Henry I. He also was the patron of the medieval chronicler Henry of Huntingdon, and was an early patron of Gilbert of Sempringham, the founder of the Gilbertine monastic order.

== Early life ==
Bloet was a member of the Norman noble family that held Ivry in Normandy. Bloet was related in some manner to Hugh, the Bishop of Bayeux from 1015 to 1049, and Hugh's brother John, who was Bishop of Avranches from 1060 to 1067. Another relative was Richard Bloet, Abbot of St Albans Abbey.

== Chancellor and bishop ==
Bloet was a royal clerk in the household of King William I of England. He accompanied William I's son, William Rufus, when Rufus traveled to England to claim the throne after William I's death. Rufus named Bloet as chancellor by January 1091, but then named Bloet to the See of Lincoln in March 1093 after the death of Remigius de Fécamp. Bloet was appointed at the same time that Anselm was appointed Archbishop of Canterbury, during a severe illness when Rufus feared he was dying. Bloet was consecrated at Hastings not long before 22 February 1094, probably on 12 February the day after the dedication of the church at Battle Abbey. By 19 March 1094 he had been replaced as chancellor by William Giffard.

Prior to Bloet's consecration, the Archbishop of York, Thomas of Bayeux, who had previously had a claim to supervise the see of Lincoln, tried to prevent the Archbishop Anselm's consecrating Bloet. Thomas argued that the area of Lindsey, which was within the diocese of Lincoln, really belonged to the archdiocese of York. The medieval chronicler Hugh the Chanter alleged that Bloet gave Rufus £3,000 to intervene on Bloet's side when Thomas attempted to assert York's claim to Lindsey, but another medieval chronicler, Henry of Huntingdon, who knew Bloet well, said that the sum was £5,000. This payment secured Rufus' support in the dispute between York and Lincoln, which was settled in Lincoln's favour. The sum of £5,000 was extremely large, eight times what Domesday Book records as the bishop of Lincoln's annual income. The king gave York the abbeys of Selby and St Oswald, Gloucester in return for the settlement in favour of Lincoln. Bloet also refused to profess obedience to Anselm, but when King William intervened on Anselm's side, Bloet made the profession to Anselm.

Bloet was one of the chief administrative officers of the kingdom under William II, often associated with Ranulf Flambard, Urse d'Abetot, and Haimo the dapifer. As a bishop, he moved the newly founded monastery of Stow to Eynsham instead. This church was considered a proprietary church and the bishops of Lincoln retained the right to appoint the abbot and installing the abbot in office. The monks of Stow had been established by his predecessor. Bloet also gave lands to the priory of Bermondsey, which became a Cluniac priory during Rufus' reign.

Even after becoming a bishop, Bloet continued to witness royal writs, witnessing six of Rufus' writs while bishop, to add to his 11 witnessed writs during his chancellorship. Bloet was one of the bishops in 1097 that attempted to persuade Anselm when the archbishop was in a dispute with Rufus over travelling to Rome to consult with the papacy. When Anselm refused to be persuaded not to go, the king ordered him to leave the kingdom, with the support of most of the bishops and nobility.

== Under Henry I ==
Bloet continued to be an advisor to the king even after Rufus was succeeded by King Henry I, and was a supporter of Henry during the rebellion of 1102. During the rebellion, Bloet was sent by King Henry to besiege Tickhill Castle, which surrendered when the king joined Bloet with a larger army. When the king and Anselm clashed over investiture, the king persuaded Bloet to consecrate a number of the king's abbatial appointments in 1102 and 1103. Throughout Henry's reign, Bloet continued to be a trusted councillor, and was often trusted with advising the queen when the king was absent from England. Bloet is only recorded as accompanying the king outside England once, in 1114. He served as a royal justice often, being named by Henry of Huntingdon as one of the justices who were not restricted to one or a few counties but who served throughout England. During Henry's reign, Bloet witnessed 155 royal documents.

When the new see at Ely was established in 1109 in a former abbey, it was carved out of Bloet's diocese who was compensated for the loss by a grant of land. This grant included the town of Spaldwick in Huntingdonshire. He was one of the councillors who urged Henry to appoint William of Corbeil to the archbishopric of Canterbury in 1123, although Bloet died before Corbeil was selected. Bloet was opposed to the other candidates, as they were monks, and he wanted a non-monk appointed at Canterbury. In 1114, when Canterbury was vacant, he had also opposed the appointment of a monk to Canterbury. During the reign of Henry, Bloet accepted the supervision of St Albans abbey, ruled by his relative Richard, when Richard objected to the harshness of the archbishop of Canterbury and switched the abbey's obedience to Lincoln instead. Bloet continued to be a benefactor to Albans throughout his episcopate. He doubled the number of canons in the cathedral chapter at Lincoln Cathedral during his episcopate. He also embellished the newly built Lincoln Cathedral and gave the cathedral many gifts of objects and lands. Most of his surviving episcopal documents concern the consecration of churches in his diocese or the confirmation of donations to religious houses. He also founded a hospital in Lincoln dedicated to the Holy Sepulchre.

Henry of Huntingdon, the medieval chronicler, wrote a letter entitled De contemptu mundi where he related a story from right before Bloet's death that Bloet felt he had fallen from King Henry's favour. Bloet allegedly told Huntingdon that the bishop had lost two lawsuits. However, the whole letter is concerned with setting out examples of prominent men who suffered a fall from grace, so possible bias on Huntingdon's part must be kept in mind. There are also records of two legal proceedings involving Bloet at the end of Bloet's life, and although Bloet lost both cases, neither was a loss of much income or prestige. In one, he was allowed to continue to hold the property, although instead of it being judged as his land alone, the settlement was that Bloet held it of St Augustine's Abbey in Canterbury. The other lawsuit involved Bloet's attempt to hold a manor free of dues owed to Westminster Abbey, which was settled in the Abbey's favour, although Bloet continued to hold the land. Nor is there any lessening of the rate of Bloet's witnessing to royal documents. It appears that Bloet's lost lawsuits were decided by other royal justices, and while he may have lost some favour with the king, he did not fall completely out of favour either.

== Death and legacy ==
Bloet was a married bishop, and he appointed his son Simon as Dean of Lincoln. It was in Bloet's household that the medieval historian Henry of Huntingdon was brought up. He died on 10 January 1123 at Woodstock, Oxfordshire and was buried at Lincoln. He had a sudden fit while out riding with King Henry and Roger of Salisbury, the Bishop of Salisbury, and collapsed in the king's arms before dying shortly thereafter without absolution, which combined with his style of living led many contemporaries to conclude he was condemned to Hell. His last words were "Lord king, I am dying" which he uttered right before collapsing into Henry's arms. His entrails were buried at Eynsham, but the rest of his body was buried in Lincoln Cathedral near the southern entrance in front of St. Mary's altar.

Henry of Huntingdon records that noblemen sent their children to be educated at Bloet's household, whether or not they were destined for a career in the church. King Henry's illegitimate son Robert of Gloucester was educated in Bloet's care. Another illegitimate son of Henry's, Richard of Lincoln, was also in Bloet's household for an education. Gilbert of Sempringham, who founded the Gilbertine Order, was also educated in Bloet's household, entering it before Bloet's death and continuing there under Bloet's successor Alexander of Lincoln. Besides educating laymen, Bloet educated his own household clergy, including sending some of them to study under Ivo, Bishop of Chartres. He was known for his ostentatious manner of living, and served personally in war when needed. The medieval chronicler William of Malmesbury claimed that he hated monks. Henry of Huntingdon, however, remembered him as handsome, cheerful, and affable. Earlier in his episcopate, Bloet had aided Christina of Markyate's family in their attempts to get the hermit to marry, at one point giving a judicial judgement that she must marry, which she refused to do. It was only after Bloet's death that Christina was able to be consecrated as a recluse at St Albans Abbey.

== Citations ==
Political offices
Preceded by Gerard	Lord Chancellor; 1092–1093	Succeeded by William Giffard
Catholic Church titles
Preceded by Remigius de Fécamp	Bishop of Lincoln; 1093–1123	Succeeded by Alexander
