= History of the Church of York =

The History of the Church of York, also known as Historia ecclesiae Eboracensis, is a 12th-century historical Latin text composed by Hugh the Chantor (died 1139). It describes the history of the archdiocese of York between 1066 and 1127, and is written almost in the form of a series of biographies of the archbishops during that period, particularly detailed during the episcopate of Thurstan, to whom Hugh was a close companion. A large concern of the text is the claims of the archbishopric of York to independence of and equality with the archbishopric of Canterbury.
