= William Giffard =

11th- and 12th-century Bishop of Winchester and Lord Chancellor (died 1129)

- Bishop of Winchester
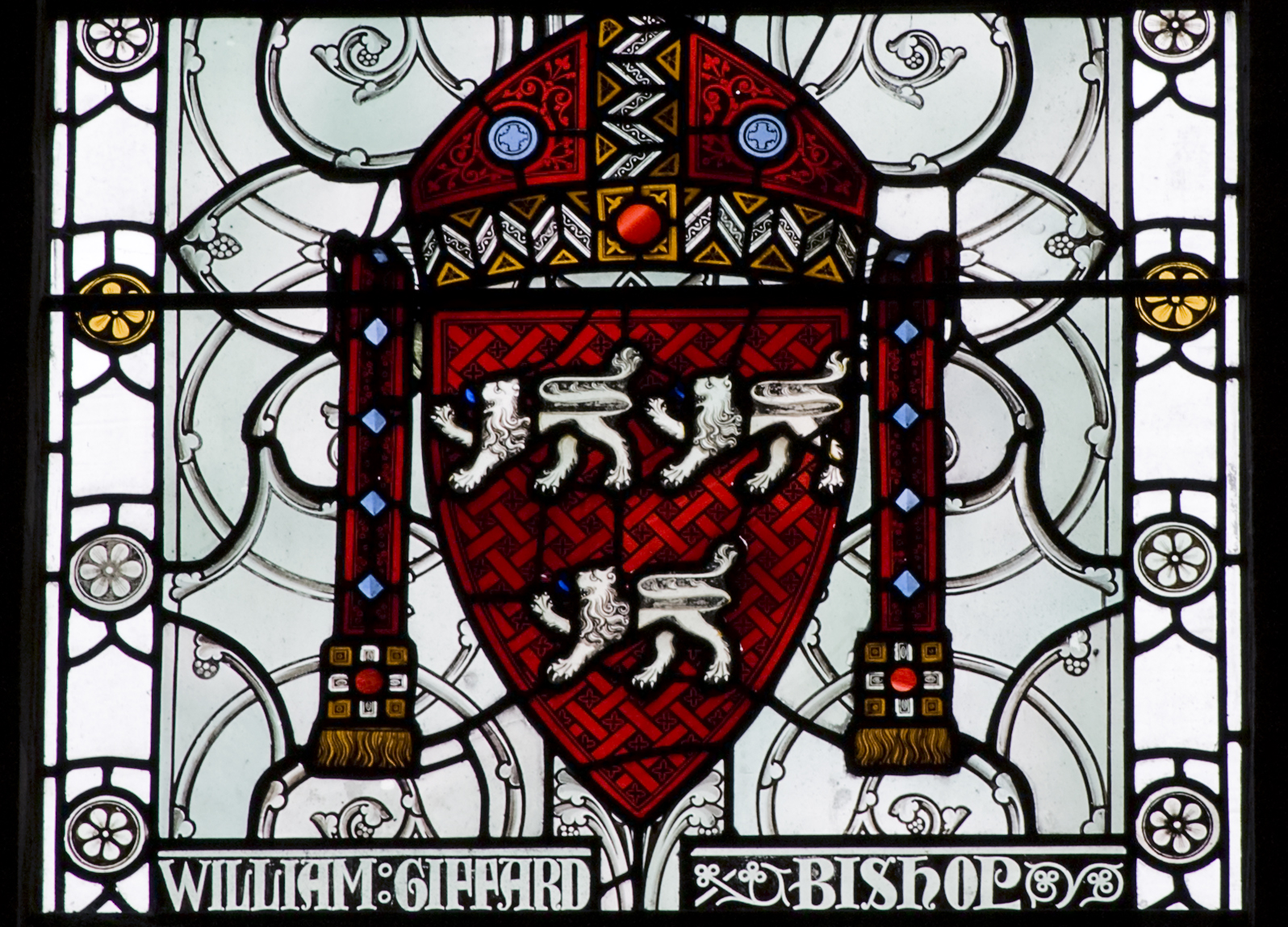
- Victorian-era reconstruction of the coat of arms of William Giffard, from the Winchester Great Hall
- Appointed: 3 August 1100
- Term ended: 23 January 1129
- Predecessor: Walkelin
- Successor: Henry of Blois

Orders
- Consecration: 11 August 1107 by Anselm of Canterbury

Personal details
- Died: 23 January 1129
- Buried: Winchester Cathedral
- Denomination: Catholic

Lord Chancellor
- In office 1093–1101
- Monarchs: William II; Henry I
- Preceded by: Robert Bloet
- Succeeded by: Roger of Salisbury

William Giffard (d. 1129), was the Lord Chancellor of William II and Henry I, from 1093 to 1101, and Bishop of Winchester (1100–1129).

== Family and early life ==
Giffard was the son of Walter and Ermengarde, daughter of Gerard Flaitel. Giffard was the brother of Walter and the brother of Rohese, wife of Richard fitz Gilbert.

He held the office of Dean of Rouen.

== Lord Chancellor ==
Giffard was Lord Chancellor under William II and Henry I from 1093 to 1101.

== Bishop of Winchester ==
On 3 August 1100 he became bishop of Winchester by nomination of Henry I. Henry nominated him probably in an attempt to win the support of the clergy in Henry's bid to claim the throne directly after the death of William Rufus. He was one of the bishops elect whom Archbishop Anselm of Canterbury refused to consecrate in 1101 as having been nominated and invested by the lay power.

During the investitures dispute Giffard was on friendly terms with Anselm and was banished for declining to accept consecration from Gerard Archbishop of York in 1103. He was, however, one of the bishops who pressed Anselm, in 1106, to give way to the king. He was finally consecrated after the settlement of 1107 on 11 August, and became a close friend of Archbishop Anselm. As bishop, William aided the first Cistercians to settle in England, when in 1128 he brought monks from L'Aumône Abbey in France to settle at Waverley Abbey. He also restored Winchester Cathedral with great magnificence.

Among Giffard's actions as bishop was the refounding of a religious house at Taunton and the staffing of it with Austin canons. The canons were drawn from Merton Priory. He was known for the close and good relations that he had with the monks of his cathedral chapter, sharing their meals and sleeping with them instead of in his own room.

== Death ==
Giffard died shortly before 25 January 1129, the date he was buried.

Political offices
Preceded by Robert Bloet	Lord Chancellor; 1093–1101	Succeeded by Roger of Salisbury
Catholic Church titles
Preceded by Walkelin	Bishop of Winchester; 1100–1129	Succeeded by Henry of Blois
