= Remigius de Fécamp =

11th-century Bishop of Lincoln

- Bishop of Dorchester; Bishop of Lincoln
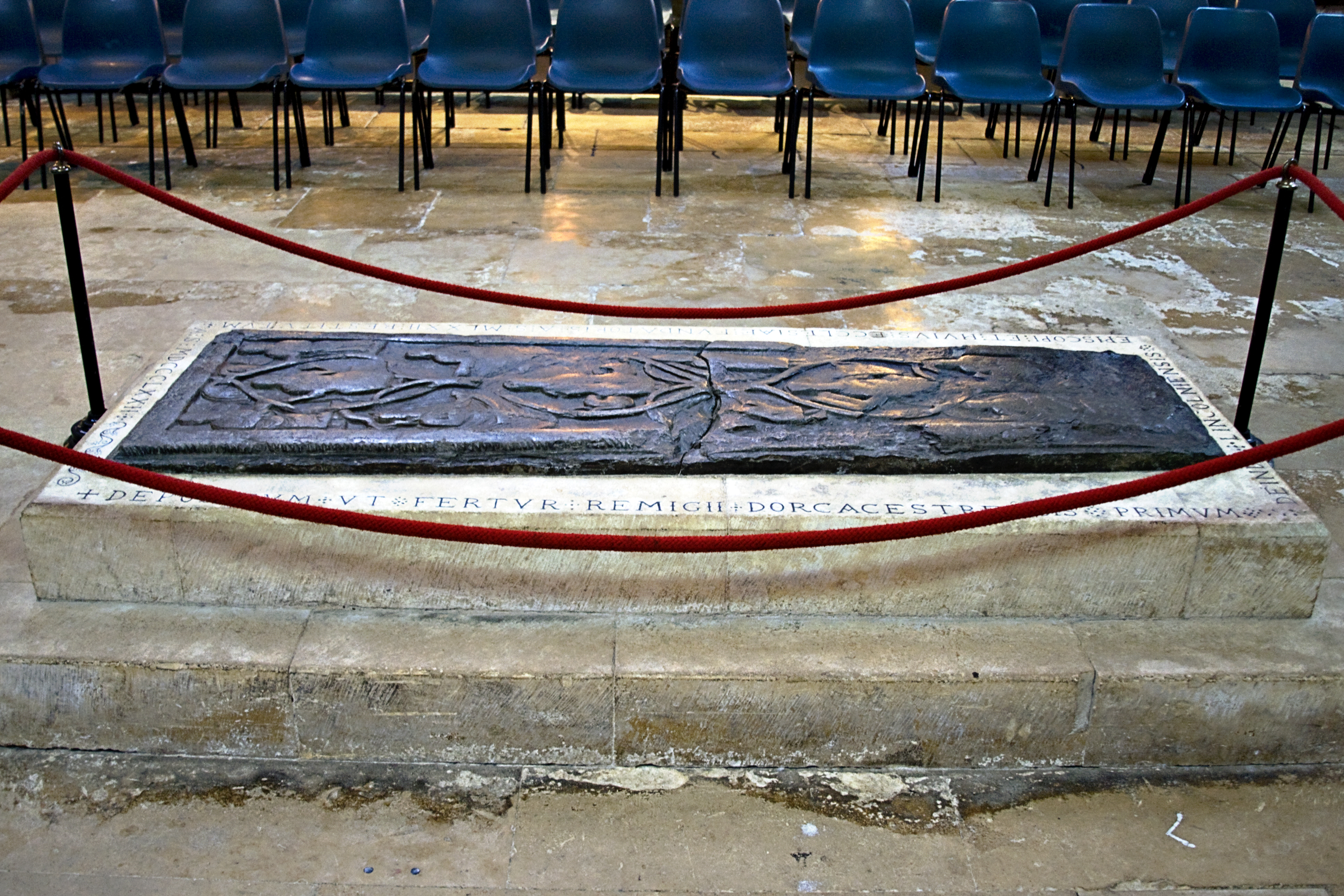
- Remigius' tomb in Lincoln Cathedral
- Appointed: 1067
- Term ended: 7 May 1092
- Predecessor: Wulfinus
- Successor: Robert Bloet
- Other post: Almoner of Fécamp Abbey

Orders
- Consecration: c. 1067 by Stigand, Archbishop of Canterbury

Personal details
- Died: 7 May 1092
- Denomination: Catholic

Remigius de Fécamp (sometimes Remigius; died 7 May 1092) was an 11th-century religious leader. He was a Benedictine monk who was a supporter of William the Conqueror and was appointed Bishop of Dorchester and Bishop of Lincoln.

== Early life ==
Remigius' date of birth is unknown, although he was probably born sometime during the 1030s, as canon law in the 11th century required a candidate for a bishopric to be at least 30 years of age. Likely, he was named for Saint Remigius, and the name was an unusual one for Normandy in that period. It may imply that he was always intended for a career in the church, and may have been a child oblate. He was a monk at Fécamp Abbey, holding the office of almoner, although the information that he held that office only dates from the Ship List, a listing of ships used by William the Conqueror in the initial invasion of England in 1066. This list only exists in a mid-12th-century manuscript but is likely a copy of an original list dating to right after 1066.

Remigius was related to William in some unknown manner. He was also related to Walter D'Aincourt, who was also related to King William II of England. Both of these relationships are documented on a lead plate said by the antiquarian William Dugdale to have been found in the grave of D'Aincourt in Lincoln Cathedral. The historian David Bates argues that the relationship to the Aincourt family is likely, based on the fact that the family held lands near Fécamp. Bates is less inclined to believe in any relationship to either William I or William II but feels it isn't possible to rule it out either, due to the complex nature of the early history of the Norman ducal family. Bates speculates that whatever relationship may have existed between Remigius and King William may have been from Remigius' possible descent from an earlier ducal concubine.

== Participation in the Norman Conquest ==
The medieval writer Henry of Huntingdon states that Remigius was a participant in the Norman Conquest of England, and was at the Battle of Hastings in 1066. The Ship List states that Remigius contributed one ship and 20 knights to the invasion force used by William the Conqueror in addition to his presence at Hastings. However, as mentioned earlier, this list only survives from a 12th-century copy which originates from Battle Abbey, the monastery founded by King William to commemorate his victory at Hastings. Battle was known to have manufactured documentary evidence to support its claims to lands as well as to have embellished the historical record to enhance its reputation. The Ship List's authenticity has been challenged, but the most recent editor of the manuscript feels that it is a copy of an earlier 11th-century listing, and thus is substantially accurate.

A later medieval writer, Gerald of Wales, who was involved in late 12th century attempts to have Remigius canonized, wrote a hagiography, or saint's life, of the bishop. In it, he stated that instead of contributing a ship and 20 knights on his own, Remigius was in charge of Fécamp's contribution of 10 knights to William's cause. This is unlikely to be accurate, as Gerald was attempting to secure the bishop's sainthood, and thus often reworked some incidents in Remigius' life to make the canonization more likely.

== Consecration and difficulties ==
Remigius was given the Bishopric of Dorchester in 1067. This was the largest diocese in England at the time, and was the first bishopric to become vacant after the Norman Conquest. Remigius was the first Norman to be appointed to an ecclesiastical post in England after the Norman Conquest. The reason for his appointment was his service to the new king, particularly for his donation of ships to the Norman Conquest. This led to accusations of simony, or the purchase of ecclesiastical office, against Remigius.

Remigius was consecrated by Stigand, the Archbishop of Canterbury, sometime around 1067. The new bishop was present at the coronation of Matilda, William's wife, as queen in 1068. But in 1070, the arrival of papal legates led to problems for Remigius, especially concerning his consecration by Stigand. As part of the consecration, Remigius had made a profession of obedience to Stigand. However, shortly after Easter in 1070, the papal legates deposed Stigand, and this action brought the acts of Stigand into disrepute, including the consecration of Remigius. The papal legates suspended the bishop from office, which did not prevent him from being present at the consecration of Lanfranc, Stigand's successor at Canterbury in August 1070. Because of the uncertainty surrounding his consecration at Stigand's hands, Remigius had to receive papal absolution for the uncanonical consecration.

Pope Alexander II later deprived Remigius of his office, requiring Remigius to travel to Rome to regain his see, which he did in 1071. While at Rome, the issue of simony was brought up, with the evidence of his contribution of the ship and knights to William being put forward as evidence that he and William had an agreement to give Remigius a bishopric in return for the contribution of men and transport. The issue of Remigius' consecration by and profession to Stigand was also brought up, and in his defense the bishop claimed that he did not know of any issues concerning Stigand's own canonical status. Bates points out that in 1067, when Remigius was consecrated, the newly crowned king was attempting to conciliate and work with the native English. By 1070, the royal policy was no longer strongly in favour of conciliating the English which would have put Remigius' actions in 1067 in a different light. Another possible reason for Remigius' consecration by and profession to Stigand rather than to the more canonically sound Ealdred, the Archbishop of York was the claims that York had made concerning Dorcester being in the archdiocese of York rather than in Canterbury.

Eventually, Remigius secured reinstatement to his bishopric. He owed his restoration to the intercession of Lanfranc, the new archbishop of Canterbury, who had petitioned Alexander for Remigius' pardon. But this was not the end of the matter, as in 1073, Remigius sought further guarantees from Pope Gregory VII concerning his tenure of his diocese, which he received in the form of a letter from Gregory in December of that year.

== Bishop under William I ==
Remigius' bishopric was the largest in England and one of the largest in the western Church. It encompassed what had originally been three different bishoprics – those of Dorchester, Leicester and Lindsey, which were combined by about 1010. Normally considered part of the Province of Canterbury, the Archbishops of York had long claimed it as part of their province due to Lindsey having been converted by Paulinus of York, the first Bishop of York. Included within Remigius' diocese were a number of monasteries, including the wealthy ones of Ely Abbey, Peterborough Abbey, Ramsey Abbey and Thorney Abbey. One difficulty with the diocese was that Dorchester was in the southern part of the large diocese, which made administration difficult. Another issue was that Dorchester was a very small town, but there was a large town in the diocese – Lincoln, which probably numbered around 6500 inhabitants.

In the years 1071–1074 Remigius was involved in as a royal judge in a case dealing with lands of Ely Abbey that were lost. Remigius served with Geoffrey de Montbray, the Bishop of Coutances, Waltheof, Earl of Northumbria, and two sheriffs. Remigius was said by Gerald of Wales to have set up 21 prebends for his cathedral clergy. He also was involved in a long dispute with the monks of Ely over the episcopal rights over the abbey.

The seat of Remigius' see was at Dorchester, but in 1072 the Accord of Winchester arranged that bishoprics should be in cities and not small villages, so Remigius moved his see to Lincoln. The diocese received grants of lands, both in Lincoln and elsewhere, as part of the move. The choice of Lincoln was dictated by the wealth of the town and its location, which was on a strategic site on the River Witham and was at the junction of two roads. He received papal approval for the move before 21 April 1073. He did not complete the move until sometime between 1075 and 1081, as he was still being titled "Bishop of Dorchester or Lincoln" in the accounts of the Council of London held in 1075, but was named as plain "Bishop of Lincoln" in a document dating from 1081.

During the early 1070s, what ecclesiastical province Dorchester belonged to was disputed between Canterbury and York, the two archdioceses in Britain. Lanfranc had demanded that Remigius profess obedience to Canterbury, but Thomas of Bayeux, the Archbishop of York, made a counter-claim to the dioceses of Dorchester, Lichfield and Worcester. Lanfranc and Thomas both attempted to get the papacy to rule on the dispute but Pope Alexander II referred the matter back to a council in England, where in the spring of 1072 it was decided that the three dioceses in dispute belonged in the province of Canterbury. However, Remigius continued to feel that York was attempting to secure the disputed bishoprics through other means. When Thomas requested the help of Remigius and the Bishop of Worcester in the consecration of the Bishop of the Orkney Islands, Remigius sought Lanfranc's support in avoiding the effort, and other bishops were sent to help with the consecration. Remigius may have been extra sensitive to the issue, as York continued to make claims Lindsey, a part of the diocese of Dorchester where Lincoln and the new episcopal centre were located. This dispute continued throughout Remigius' bishopric.

In the 1080s Remigius was at the royal court when the king was in England, as he is attested at royal courts in February and May 1081, again at the Christmas court in 1085, and again in 1086. These are all of the appearances of King William in England during this decade, except for one quick visit in the winter of 1082 and 1083. However, Remigius is never a witness to royal documents that were drawn up in Normandy, and from this information it appears likely that the bishop remained in England after he acquired his diocese, except for the visit to Rome in 1071.

Remigius was one of the bishops that met in 1085 at Gloucester and took part in the discussions there that led to the survey known as Domesday Book. Remigius was heavily involved in the creation of Domesday. He served as a Domesday commissioner for Worcester, part of the "Circuit V" of Domesday, which included – besides Worcestershire – Cheshire, Gloucestershire, Herefordshire, Shropshire, and Staffordshire.

== Bishop under William II ==
Remigius was present at the first Christmas court held by William II at Westminster, along with several other bishops and barons. Henry of Huntingdon, a medieval chronicler, recorded that Remigius was once accused of treason, but was cleared after one of his servants performed the ordeal of hot iron, which he survived. The exact date of this event is unknown, and it might be connected with a rebellion in 1075 against William I. Another possibility is that it was part of the rebellion of Odo of Bayeux at the start of William II's reign. A third possibility is that it might not be connected to either rebellion. Possibly connected to this episode is an extant letter from Lanfranc to Remigius, reassuring the bishop that although some doubted his loyalty to the king, the king did not. Lanfranc's letter does not make it clear which king is intended, and it is possible that this letter is not connected to the episode related by Henry of Huntingdon. If either episode is related to the rebellion at the start of William II's reign, the period of uncertainty about Remigius' loyalty was short-lived, as he witnessed a charter of the king's shortly after the rebellion was quashed.

Remigius' last days were dominated by a struggle with Thomas, the Archbishop of York, who claimed that the diocese of Lincoln was within his province, instead of Canterbury. The medieval chronicler John of Worcester related that Remigius bribed King William II to order all the English bishops to attend the consecration, to sidestep Thomas' efforts to assert his claims to Lincoln. The consecration conflict is part of a tale related by another medieval chronicler, William of Malmesbury, about the astrological interests of Robert Losinga, the Bishop of Hereford. According to William of Malmesbury, Robert's astrological horoscopes predicted Remigius' death and that it would take place before the cathedral's consecration.

Remigius introduced Benedictine monks to the Abbey of St Mary at Stow before 1076, and annexed Eynsham Abbey to Stow in 1091. This may have been the opening move in an attempt to introduce monks into the Lincoln cathedral chapter, but Remigius' successor, Robert Bloet, did not follow through with the scheme if this was the intention.

== Construction and organization of Lincoln Cathedral ==
Remigius began the construction of Lincoln Cathedral in the mid-1070s. The church was modeled after the cathedral at Rouen, as well as the abbey church of St Etienne, Caen. An older view, that the design was influenced by St Mark's, Venice, has been rejected by most historians. The tower he constructed, which is now incorporated into the west front of the cathedral, may have been constructed as a keep tower. The art historian Anthony Quiney suggests that the tower may have served as the bishop's palace until the time of Alexander of Lincoln.

Although traditional accounts have stated that the new cathedral was constructed on the site of a church dedicated to Saint Mary in Lincoln and that thus the new cathedral usurped the endowment of that church as well as its site. However, recent historical research has challenged this view, with the historian Dorothy Owen arguing that although there was a church on the site, it was a small parish church with little lands or property.

Little now remains of Remigius' construction, just the tower which has been greatly altered from the original design by the addition of three porches. It is likely that construction began in the middle part of the 1070s and was mostly complete by the time of its consecration in 1092, two days after Remigius' death.

Along with building a new cathedral, Remigius also organized the cathedral chapter, or the clergy that served the new church. At Lincoln, Remigius set up a chapter that was composed of secular clergy, rather than one composed of monks, which some of the other new cathedrals founded after the Norman Conquest used. This was an unusual choice, as Remigius himself was a monk, and many of the new monastic cathedral chapters were founded by monks, but Bates suggests that one reason may have been the sheer size of the diocese, which required large numbers of clergy to fully staff its functions. Monks in the required numbers would have been difficult to find.

The exact organization of the chapter seems to have evolved, with territorial archdeaconries being set up. Although the later medieval writer Gerald of Wales asserted that Remigius borrowed the structure of the cathedral chapter of Rouen Cathedral, this has been refuted by modern historians, who have shown that Rouen had no fully organized chapter at the time, thus making it impossible for Remigius to have borrowed the complete structure as Gerald asserted. Whether the chapter was organized into prebends during Remigius' episcopate is unclear, with Gerald claiming that there were 21 by the time of Remigius' death, but this is suspiciously half of the number that Gerald claimed existed at the death of Remigius' successor, Robert Bloet, so it is viewed with suspicion. What is clear, however, is that the library at Lincoln was in existence. While only one surviving manuscript can be traced to the cathedral under Remigius, a surviving book catalogue testifies to the existence of the library under Remigius.

== Death and legacy ==
Remigius scheduled the dedication of his new cathedral for 9 May 1092 but faced a challenge by Thomas of York who once more claimed that Lindsey, and thus Lincoln, were part of Thomas' diocese. Remigius met Thomas' challenge by securing the permission of King William II for the consecration by the payment of a bribe, and most of the English bishops came to Lincoln to help with the ceremony. However, Remigius died before the consecration, but it is unclear if it was two days, one day, or the night before the ceremony, as different medieval writers gave differing time scales. Most sources give Remigius' death date as 8 May, but his death was commemorated on 6 May. The cathedral was not consecrated on the scheduled date, finally being consecrated later after Robert Bloet, the next bishop, paid another bribe to the king to settle Thomas' claims to Lincoln.

In the twelfth century, a hagiography was written and attempts were made to have him canonized as a saint. The Vita Sancti Remigi was composed by Gerald of Wales. The start of the effort may have begun in the 1180s and the Vita was based on a list of miracles performed at the bishop's tomb from that period. Although miracles were ascribed to him and a cult persisted into the thirteenth century, he was never canonized.

Henry of Huntingdon described Remigius as short but great-hearted and very charming. He had a dark complexion. William of Malmesbury, another medieval writer, concurred with the fact that Remigius was short, and the implication in William's work is that the bishop was a dwarf.

Remigius' bones, which had been thought to have been buried beneath the nave of Lincoln Cathedral, were found, with his chalice, paten and half his pastoral staff, under a slab of black marble, in the angel choir of the cathedral, in 1927.

== Citations ==
Catholic Church titles
Preceded by None (office reconstituted from Bishop of Dorchester)	Bishop of Lincoln; 1072–1092	Succeeded by Robert Bloet
