= Gerard (archbishop of York) =

Chancellor of England (1085–1102) and Archbishop of York (1100–1108)

- Archbishop of York
- Appointed: December 1100
- Term ended: 21 May 1108
- Predecessor: Thomas I
- Successor: Thomas II
- Previous posts: Bishop of Hereford; Archdeacon of Rouen; Lord Chancellor of England

Orders
- Consecration: 8 June 1096 by Anselm

Personal details
- Died: 21 May 1108 Southwell
- Buried: York Minster
- Parents: Osbert and Anna

Lord Chancellor
- In office 1085–1092
- Monarchs: William I; William II
- Preceded by: Maurice
- Succeeded by: Robert Bloet

Gerard (died 21 May 1108) was Archbishop of York between 1100 and 1108 and Lord Chancellor of England from 1085 until 1092. A Norman, he was a member of the cathedral clergy at Rouen before becoming a royal clerk under King William I of England and subsequently his son King William II Rufus. Gerard was appointed Lord Chancellor by William I, and he continued in that office under Rufus, who rewarded him with the Bishopric of Hereford in 1096. Gerard may have been with the king's hunting party when William II was killed, as he is known to have witnessed the first charter issued by the new king, Henry I of England, within days of William's death.

Soon after Henry's coronation, Gerard was appointed to the recently vacant see of York, and became embroiled in the long-running dispute between York and the see of Canterbury concerning which archbishopric had primacy over England. Gerard managed to secure papal recognition of York's claim to jurisdiction over the church in Scotland, but he was forced to agree to a compromise with his counterpart at Canterbury, Anselm, over Canterbury's claims to authority over York, although it was not binding on his successors. In the Investiture Controversy between the king and the papacy over the right to appoint bishops, Gerard worked on reconciling the claims of the two parties; the controversy was finally resolved in 1107.

Gerard was a patron of learning to the extent that he urged at least one of his clergy to study Hebrew, a language not commonly studied at that time. He himself was a student of astrology, which led to suggestions that he was a magician and a sorcerer. Partly because of such rumours, and his unpopular attempts to reform his cathedral clergy, Gerard was denied a burial inside York Minster after his sudden death in 1108. His successor as archbishop subsequently had Gerard's remains moved into the cathedral church from their initial resting place beside the cathedral porch.

== Early life and career ==
Gerard was the nephew of Walkelin, Bishop of Winchester, and Simon, Abbot of Ely. His parents were Osbert and Anna, and his brother Peter was also a royal clerk. The places and times of his birth and upbringing are unknown; he is documented as cantor of Rouen Cathedral, and precentor of the same cathedral, although the dates of his appointments to either office are unrecorded. By 1091 he had become archdeacon of Rouen. He served in the royal chancery under successive kings of England, William I and William II.

== Bishop of Hereford ==
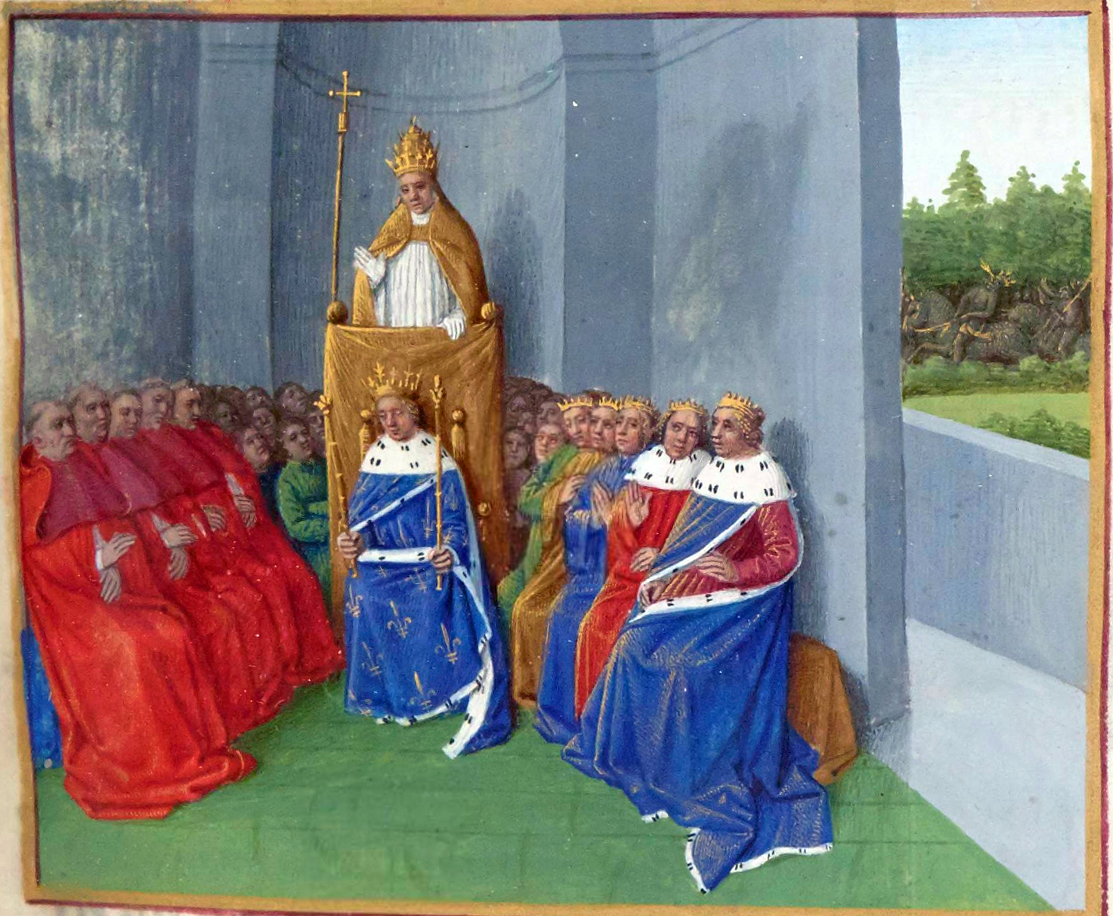
Gerard undertook missions to Pope Urban II, seen here preaching the First Crusade in an illustration from the Grand Chronicle of France, a work from about 1455.

Gerard was appointed Lord Chancellor of England in 1085, and was present at William I's deathbed in 1087. He continued as Chancellor to William Rufus until 1092; what precipitated his loss of office is unclear. He retained the king's trust, for Rufus employed him in 1095 along with William Warelwast on a diplomatic mission to Pope Urban II regarding Archbishop Anselm receiving the pallium, the sign of an archbishop's authority. Rufus offered to recognise Urban as pope rather than the antipope Clement III in return for Anselm's deposition and the delivery of Anselm's pallium into Rufus' custody, (Note: An anti-pope is a clergyman elected alongside an already elected pope, usually because of a contested election. The period from 1059 to 1179 was a period when there were numerous antipopes; in 75 of those 120 years, there were at least two claimants to the papal throne.) to dispose of as he saw fit. The mission departed for Rome in February 1095 and returned by Whitsun with a papal legate, Walter, the Cardinal Bishop of Albano, who had Anselm's pallium. The legate secured Rufus' recognition of Urban, but subsequently refused to consider Anselm's deposition. Rufus resigned himself to Anselm's position as archbishop, and at the king's court at Windsor, he consented to Anselm being given the pallium.

Although not yet ordained, Gerard was rewarded with the Bishopric of Hereford, and he was consecrated by Archbishop Anselm on 8 June 1096; his ordination as a deacon and priest had taken place the previous day. He assisted at the consecration of St Paul's Cathedral in London on 9 June 1096. He may have been a member of the hunting party in the New Forest on 2 August 1100 when Rufus was killed, as he witnessed King Henry I's coronation charter – now known as the Charter of Liberties – three days later at Winchester, close by the New Forest. Gerard was present at Henry's coronation that same day, along with Maurice, Bishop of London. Henry was probably crowned by Maurice, but the medieval chronicler Walter Map states that Gerard crowned Henry in return for a promise of the first vacant archbishopric. Gerard may have assisted Maurice in the coronation ceremony.

== Archbishop ==
Gerard became Archbishop of York in December 1100. No source mentions him being invested by the king, but as Anselm urged Pope Paschal II to give Gerard his pallium, which he would have been unlikely to do if Gerard had been invested by Henry, that possibility seems remote. At Whitsun in 1101 King Henry I, with Anselm's support, deprived Ranulf Flambard, Bishop of Durham, of the lands of the see of Durham, because Ranulf had defected to Henry's elder brother Robert Curthose, who also claimed the English throne. Gerard then deposed Ranulf from his bishopric. Soon after his translation to York, Gerard began a long dispute with Anselm, claiming equal primacy with the Archbishop of Canterbury and refusing to make a profession of canonical obedience to Anselm, part of the long Canterbury–York dispute. At the 1102 Council of Westminster, Gerard reportedly kicked over the smaller chair provided for him as Archbishop of York, and refused to be seated until he was provided with one as large as Anselm's. He travelled to Rome in 1102 to receive his pallium from the pope, to whom he presented the king's side against Anselm in the controversy surrounding investitures. The pope decided against the king, but Gerard and two other bishops reported that the pope had assured them that the various papal decrees against the lay investiture of bishops would not be enforced. Their claim was denied by Anselm's representatives and the pope, who excommunicated Gerard until he recanted.

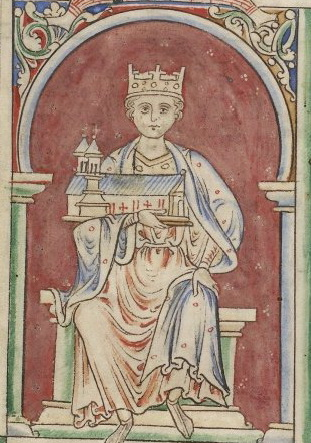
Thirteenth-century manuscript illustration of Henry I

Gerard secured papal recognition of York's metropolitan see for the Scots. (Note: Paschal II's letter to the Scottish bishops is the earliest known papal letter to Scotland.) He subsequently consecrated Roger as Bishop of Orkney, but refused to consecrate Thurgot to the see of St Andrews because Thurgot would not recognise the primacy of York. Gerard gave generously to the monasteries of his diocese; the medieval chronicler Hugh the Chantor stated that Thomas II, Gerard's successor, accused Gerard of having dissipated the diocese's endowment. King Olaf I of Man and the Isles wrote to "G", Archbishop of York, asking for the consecration of "our bishop" by York, but it does not appear to have taken place under Gerard or his successor. (Note: Olaf had been in exile in England and is likely to have met Gerard there.)

During the first four years of Henry's reign, Gerard was one of the king's chief advisors, along with Robert of Meulan, Count of Meulan in Normandy, and later Earl of Leicester. Gerard was one of Henry's greatest supporters among the bishops during the Investiture Crisis. In 1101 Gerard witnessed a treaty between Henry and Robert, the Count of Flanders, which sought as far as possible to distance Robert from any future conflict between Henry and his elder brother Robert Curthose, or between Henry and King Philip I of France. After Gerard's return from Rome he restored Ranulf Flambard to the see of Durham. In 1102 Anselm refused to consecrate three bishops, two of whom had received investiture from the king; Gerard offered to consecrate them instead, but all except one refused. From 1105 onwards, Gerard slowly began to embrace the papal position on investiture of bishops, which opposed laymen investing bishops with the symbols of episcopal authority. As part of his change of position, Gerard withdrew from court to care for his diocese. Towards the end of 1105, Gerard attempted to join Bohemond of Antioch, who was assembling a crusading force in France, but it appears that King Henry prevented Gerard's departure. In 1106, Gerard wrote to Bohemond that he was still preparing to go on crusade, but he never did. At about the same time, Gerard was working to find a mutually acceptable resolution to the Investiture Crisis, writing a number of letters and other works supporting Anselm's and the pope's position. By 1107, King Henry and Anselm had reached an agreement settling the dispute.

Gerard agreed to a compromise on the matter of obedience to Anselm. King Henry proposed that Anselm accept a witnessed oath from Gerard that he would remain bound by the profession he made to Anselm on his consecration as Bishop of Hereford. Gerard made this oath at the Council of Westminster in 1107. It was a victory for Canterbury, but not a complete one, as Gerard avoided making a written profession, and it was specific to Gerard, not to his office. Gerard continued to oppose Anselm's attempts to assert Canterbury's primacy, but the two were reconciled before Gerard's death.

Gerard also had an uneasy relationship with his cathedral chapter, after attempting to reform his cathedral clergy by forcing them to give up their wives and concubines and become ordained priests. (Note: Priestly celibacy was not enforced with any rigour until the 12th century; most clergy of the 11th century would have been sons of priests. Nor was it required that all cathedral clergy be ordained priests; they could have only taken vows for one of the lower orders of the clergy, such as the subdeaconate or deaconate.) He wrote to Anselm in 1103, complaining of the intransigence of his clergy and envying Anselm's better relations with Canterbury's chapter, which was composed of monks instead of the secular canons who made up York Minster's chapter. In this correspondence, Gerard complained that some of the York canons refused to be ordained as priests, thereby hoping to avoid taking the vow of celibacy. He also accused them of accepting prebends but refusing to live or work at the cathedral, and of focusing on a narrow legal definition of celibacy without actually being celibate. The canons' argument was that they were only required not to maintain women in their own houses, but they were not forbidden to visit or entertain women in houses belonging to others. It was not only Gerard who complained about the relationship between himself and his canons; the latter accused Gerard of impoverishing York by making gifts of lands to others.

== Death and legacy ==
Gerard was an associate of the anonymous author of the Quadripartitus and the Leges Henrici Primi, two 12th-century law books. The medieval chronicler William of Malmesbury charged Gerard with immorality, avarice, and the practice of magic. Gerard encouraged at least one of his clergy to study Hebrew, a language not normally studied at the time. Some chroniclers considered his ownership of a Hebrew psalter to be disturbing, seeing it as a sign of heresy or secret Judaism. Among the sins that Malmesbury imputed to him was the study of Julius Firmicus Maternus, a late Roman astrologer, every morning, which to Malmesbury meant that Gerard was a sorcerer. Malmesbury further claimed that Gerard was "lewd and lustful". In Gerard's favour, Anselm regarded him as learned and highly intelligent. Some verses composed by Gerard survive in unpublished form, now in the British Library manuscript collection as part of manuscript Cotton Titus D.xxiv. (Note: This collection was made about 1200 at Rufford Abbey in Nottinghamshire. and includes five poems by Gerard, all on folio 61 of the manuscript.) A collection of his letters circulated in the mid-12th century, part of a bequest made to Bec Abbey in 1164 by Philip de Harcourt, the Bishop of Bayeux, but it is now lost.

Gerard died suddenly on 21 May 1108, at Southwell, on his way to London to attend a council. His body was found in an orchard, next to a book of "curious arts", his copy of Julius Firmicus. His canons refused to allow his burial within his cathedral, but their hostility probably owed more to Gerard's attempts to reform their lifestyle than to his alleged interest in sorcery. Gerard was at first buried beside the porch at York Minster, but his successor, Thomas, moved the remains inside the cathedral church.

== Citations ==
Political offices
Preceded by Maurice	Lord Chancellor; 1085–1092	Succeeded by Robert Bloet
Catholic Church titles
Preceded by Robert the Lotharingian	Bishop of Hereford; 1096–1100	Succeeded by Roger
Preceded by Thomas I	Archbishop of York; 1100–1108	Succeeded by Thomas II
