= Primacy of Canterbury =

Hierarchy issue in the Church of England

Within the Church of England, the primacy of Canterbury or primacy of England is the supremacy of the Archbishop of Canterbury (as Primate of All England) over the Archbishop of York.

== History ==
=== 1071 ===
The question of whether the Archbishop of Canterbury or the Archbishop of York should take precedence was once a cause of a long struggle and frequently embittered the mutual relations between the two sees. The dispute was temporarily resolved in 1071 after Lanfranc, Archbishop of Canterbury, and Thomas of Bayeux, Archbishop of York, submitted the matter in person to Pope Alexander II in Rome. He decided in favour of Canterbury, and at a subsequent synod it was resolved that the future Archbishops of York must be consecrated in Canterbury Cathedral and swear allegiance to the Archbishop of Canterbury, and that the Humber was to be the southern limit of the metropolitan jurisdiction of York. This decision was ratified in the Accord of Winchester.

=== 1118 ===
The arrangement ratified in the Accord of Winchester lasted until 1118/1119, when Thurstan, archbishop-elect, refused to make submission to Canterbury, and in consequence the Archbishop of Canterbury, Ralph d'Escures, declined to consecrate him. Thurstan thereupon successfully appealed to Pope Calixtus II, who not only himself consecrated him, but also gave him a Bull releasing him and his successors from the supremacy of Canterbury.

=== 1352 ===
From time to time, during the reign of Henry II and succeeding kings, the quarrel broke out again, until Pope Innocent VI (1352–62) settled it. He did so by confirming an arrangement that the Archbishop of Canterbury should take precedence with the title 'Primate of All England', but that the Archbishop of York should retain the style of 'Primate of England'. Each prelate was to carry his metropolitical cross in the province of the other, and if they were together their cross-bearers should walk abreast. The Archbishop of York also undertook that each of his successors should send an image of gold to the shrine of St. Thomas of Canterbury.

=== 16th century to present ===
With the pre-eminence of the Archbishop of Canterbury acknowledged by an Act of Parliament passed during the reign of Henry VIII, this status quo lasts to this day.

== Present day ==
The titles of the two archbishops have been distinguished since the 14th century with the Archbishop of Canterbury known as Primate of All England and the Archbishop of York as Primate of England. A similar distinction in Ireland makes the Archbishop of Armagh Primate of All Ireland and that of Dublin Primate of Ireland.

== See also ==
- Structure of the Church of England
