= Thomas II of York =

Archbishop of York from 1109 to 1114

Thomas
- Archbishop of York
- Installed: unknown
- Term ended: 24 February 1114
- Predecessor: Gerard
- Successor: Thurstan

Orders
- Consecration: 27 June 1109

Personal details
- Born: Thomas
- Died: 24 February 1114 Beverley
- Buried: York Minster
- Parents: Sampson, Bishop of Worcester

Thomas II (Note: To distinguish him from his uncle, also a Thomas who was archbishop of York, Thomas is usually known as Thomas II or Thomas the Younger.) (died 24 February 1114) was a medieval archbishop of York.

== Early life and career ==
Thomas was the nephew of Thomas of Bayeux, archbishop of York, and the son of the elder Thomas' brother Samson, Bishop of Worcester. He was a royal chaplain, and then Provost of Beverley Minster in 1092, both appointments he owed to his uncle. He was raised in the cathedral chapter at York, and the clergy of York trusted him, and he proved himself devoted to York's cause against the primacy of Canterbury. Thomas' brother Richard became Bishop of Bayeux in about 1108, holding the post till his death in 1133. Thomas and Richard's sister, Isabelle of Douvres, was the mistress of Robert of Gloucester, and their son Richard was Bishop of Bayeux from 1135 to 1142.

== Archbishop ==
Thomas became Archbishop of York in May 1108 at the request of the dean and cathedral chapter of York. On account of his refusal to profess obedience to the Archbishop of Canterbury, his consecration was delayed and formed part of the Canterbury-York dispute. Thomas said that the chapter would not allow him to make a written profession, and the chapter wrote as a body to Archbishop Anselm of Canterbury confirming this. Meanwhile, the dean of York went to Rome to procure the pallium for Thomas, which was sent with a papal legate. Anselm died in April 1109 without any resolution to the dispute between the two archbishops. He had told the bishops before his death that he felt that Thomas must make a profession of obedience, and obediently the bishops appealed to the king's court to oblige Thomas to do so. Henry I and his bishops finally decided against Thomas, who capitulated and was consecrated in London on 27 June 1109 by Richard de Beaumis, Bishop of London. He received his pallium from Cardinal Ulrich, the legate, on 1 August 1109.

Thomas worked to extend York's metropolitan authority over Scotland, and consecrated Michael of Glasgow as Bishop of Glasgow. Michael made a written profession of obedience to York before his consecration. Thomas also consecrated Thurgot as Bishop of St Andrews, although Thurgot seems to have managed to insert a reservation of his rights into his oath. Other Scottish bishops he consecrated were Radulf Novell as Bishop of Orkney and Wimund to as Bishop of Man and the Isles.

In the diocese of York, Thomas founded the Hospital of St. John the Baptist at Ripon. He also created more prebends in his diocese, extending the work of his two predecessors in introducing the Norman system of ecclesiastical government. He is said to have been stopped from appropriating the relics of Saint Eata only by a vision of the saint. He also endowed Hexham Priory, a house of the Canons Regular of Saint Augustine, with lands and books. He himself helped found the priory at Hexham when he expelled the hereditary priest from the church and settled there a group of canons from Huntingdon Priory.

== Death and legacy ==
Thomas died at Beverley on 24 February 1114. He was noted for his chastity, but equally noted for his gluttony, and died of overeating. Thomas was buried in York Minster near his uncle. Hugh the Chantor relates the story that Thomas, one time when ill, was told by his doctors that he would only be cured by sexual intercourse with a young girl. Some of Thomas' friends then attempted to introduce a young woman into his household, but Thomas instead prayed to a saint, John of Beverley, and recovered.

== Citations ==
Catholic Church titles
Preceded by Gerard	Archbishop of York; 1109–1114	Succeeded by Thurstan
