= Accord of Winchester =

11th-century document from England

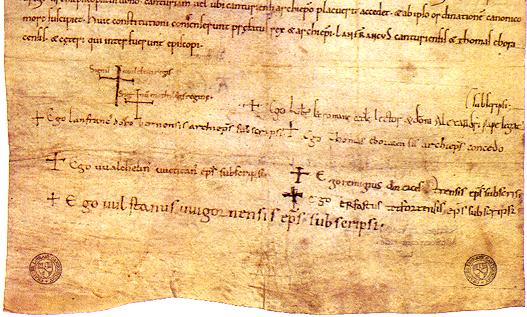
The Accord of Winchester from 1072, signed by (top to bottom, left-hand column) William, Matilda, Lanfranc, Walkelin and Wulfstan, along with (top to bottom, right-hand column) Papal legate, Thomas, Remigius and Herfast. The signatures of William I and Matilda are the first two large crosses.

The Accord of Winchester is the 11th-century document that establishes the primacy of the Archbishop of Canterbury over the Archbishop of York.

It originated in a dispute over primacy between Thomas, the archbishop of York, and Lanfranc, the new Norman archbishop of Canterbury, soon after the latter had taken office. The case was first heard by King William I at the old Saxon royal capital of Winchester at Easter (8 April) 1072, in the royal chapel in the castle. It was then heard at Windsor at Pentecost (27 May), where the final settlement was made, with William deciding in Lanfranc's favour, and formalised in this document.

This did not end the Canterbury–York dispute over the primacy, as it continued for a number of years after this.

== Signatories ==
When King William and Queen Matilda signed the document with crosses, it did not necessarily mean they were unused to writing, infirm or even illiterate. They and all the bishops signed with crosses, as illiterate people would later do, but they did so in accordance with current legal practice, not because they or the bishops could not write their own names.

It (in the CCA-DCc-ChAnt/A/2 version) was also signed by

- the Archbishop of Canterbury
- the Archbishop of York, who signed 'concedo' (I concede), unlike all the other signatories, who signed 'subscripso' (I subscribe)
- Wulfstan, bishop of Worcester
- Walkelin, bishop of Winchester
- Remigius de Fécamp, bishop of Lincoln, who had moved his seat to that city earlier that year
- Herfast, bishop of Thetford
- Hubert, 'lector' of the Roman Church and papal legate of Pope Alexander II (the pope who had backed King William's invasion of England and had backed Lanfranc in the dispute)

and additionally, in the CCA-DCc-ChAnt/A/1 version, :

- William, bishop of London
- Hereman, bishop of Sherborne
- Walter, bishop of Hereford
- Giso, bishop of Wells
- Stigand, bishop of Chichester
- Siward, bishop of Rochester
- Osbern FitzOsbern, bishop of Exeter
- Odo, bishop of Bayeux, earl of Kent
- Geoffrey, bishop of Coutances, one of the nobles ('primates') of the English
- Scotland ('Scolland'), abbot of St Augustine's Abbey, Canterbury
- Aelfwine, abbot of Ramsey Abbey
- Aethelnoth ('Elnodus'), abbot of Glastonbury Abbey
- Thurstan, abbot of Ely Abbey
- Wulfwold, abbot of Chertsey Abbey
- Elwin ('Eluuius' [also known as Æthelwig]), abbot of Evesham ('hevesand')
- Frederick, abbot of St Albans
- Geoffrey, abbot of St Peter's, Westminster
- Baldwin, abbot of Bury St Edmunds
- Turold, abbot of Peterborough
- Adelelm, abbot of Abingdon
- Riwallon ('Rualodus'), abbot of Winchester New Minster

Both versions are endorsed with descriptions and marks in 13th-century hands.

== Copies ==
The main copies are held at the Canterbury Cathedral archives.(Catalogue entries for the CCA-DCc-ChAnt/A/1 version and the CCA-DCc-ChAnt/A/2 version) There is also one at the British Library.

== Versions ==
In the Canterbury Cathedral Archives:

- CCA-DCc-Register E, f46r and CCA-DCc-Register I, ff60v-61r (sections of royal charters for liberties of the Church)
- CCA-DCc-ChAnt/A/2 (some significant variations)

In the British Library

- BL Cotton Appendix 56, ff57r-58r

== See also ==
Council of Winchester (1072)
