= Thurstan =

Archbishop of York from 1114 to 1140

- Archbishop of York
- Elected: August 1114
- Term ended: 21 January 1140 (res.)
- Predecessor: Thomas II
- Successor: Waltheof of Melrose

Orders
- Ordination: 6 June 1115 by Ranulf Flambard
- Consecration: 19 October 1119 by Pope Callixtus II

Personal details
- Born: c. 1070 Bayeux, Duchy of Normandy
- Died: 6 February 1140 (aged c. 69) Pontefract, Yorkshire, England
- Buried: Pontefract
- Parents: Anger and Popelina

Thurstan (Note: This name was basically the old Norse name Thorsteinn, meaning 'Thor's stone'; there are different spellings of it: Toustain, Tostain, Toutain, still existing today as Norman surnames. Thurstan is its anglicised version.) or Turstin of Bayeux (c. 1070 – 6 February 1140) was a medieval Archbishop of York, the son of a priest. He served kings William II and Henry I of England before his election to the see of York in 1114. Once elected, his consecration was delayed for five years while he fought attempts by the Archbishop of Canterbury to assert primacy over York. Eventually, he was consecrated by the pope instead and allowed to return to England. While archbishop, he secured two new suffragan bishops for his province. When Henry I died, Thurstan supported Henry's nephew Stephen of Blois as king. Thurstan also defended the northern part of England from invasion by the Scots, taking a leading part in organising the English forces at the Battle of the Standard (1138). Shortly before his death, Thurstan resigned from his see and took the habit of a Cluniac monk.

== Early life ==
Thurstan was the son of a canon of St Paul's in London named Anger, Auger or Ansgar, (Note: Anger or Auger former Norman first name, today surname Anger (without -s, Angers with -s means a native of Angers), some Auger, all from Ásgeir, Norse name, the same as Oscar or Ōs-gār.) who held the prebend of Cantlers. Another son of Anger, Audoen, was later Bishop of Évreux. Thurstan's mother was named Popelina. Thurstan was born sometime about 1070 in Bayeux, in the Bessin region of Normandy. Before 1104, the father was given the prebend of Cantlers by Maurice, Bishop of London, and the family moved to England.

Early in his career, Thurstan held the prebendary of Consumpta per mare in the diocese of London, and served both William Rufus and Henry I as a royal clerk. At some point in Thurstan's early career, he visited Cluny, where he vowed to become a Cluniac monk later in his life. Thurstan also served Henry as almoner, and it was Henry who obtained Thurstan's election as Archbishop of York in August 1114. He was ordained a deacon in December 1114 and ordained a priest on 6 June 1115 by Ranulf Flambard, who was Bishop of Durham.

== Controversy and exile ==
The Archbishop of Canterbury, Ralph d'Escures, refused to consecrate Thurstan unless the archbishop-elect made a profession of obedience to the southern see. This was part of the long-running Canterbury-York dispute, which started in 1070. Thurstan refused to make such a profession, and asked the king for permission to go to Rome to consult Pope Pascal II. Henry I refused to allow him to make the journey, but even without a personal appeal from Thurstan, Paschal decided against Canterbury. At the Council of Salisbury in 1116, the English king ordered Thurstan to submit to Canterbury, but instead Thurstan publicly resigned the archbishopric. On his way to the council, Thurstan had received letters from Paschal II that supported York and commanded that he should be consecrated without a profession. Similar letters had gone to Ralph d'Escures from the pope, ordering Ralph, as Archbishop of Canterbury, to consecrate Thurstan. After the news of the letters became public, Thurstan's resignation was ignored, and he continued to be considered the archbishop-elect.

Over the next three years, the new popes, Gelasius II and Calixtus II, championed Thurstan's case, and on 19 October 1119 he was consecrated by Calixtus at Reims. This happened despite, Thurstan's promise to Henry, according to Canterbury sources, that he would not allow the pope to consecrate him. Enraged at this, the king refused to allow the newly consecrated archbishop to enter England, and Thurstan remained for some time on the continent in the company of the pope. While he was travelling with the pope, he also visited Adela of Blois, King Henry's sister, who was also Thurstan's spiritual daughter. At about this same time, Calixtus issued two bulls in Thurstan's favor: one released York from Canterbury's supremacy forever, and the other demanded the king allow Thurstan to return to York. The pope threatened an interdict on England as a punishment if the papal bull was not obeyed. At length, Thurstan's friends, including Adela, succeeded in reconciling him with Henry, and he rejoined the king in Normandy. At Easter 1120, he escorted Adela to the monastery of Marcigny, where she retired from active secular affairs. He was recalled to England in early 1121.

== Archbishop ==
One of the main weaknesses of the see of York was its lack of suffragan bishops. Thurstan managed to secure the resurrection of the Diocese of Galloway, or Whithorn, in 1125. It is possible that he compromised with Fergus of Galloway, who was the lord or sub-king of Galloway, in what is now Scotland. In this Thurstan secured another suffragan, and Fergus gained a bishop in his lordship, where previously ecclesiastical matters in his subkingdom had been handled by Scottish bishops. The first bishop was the native Galwegian – Gilla Aldan. This provoked the wrath of Wimund, Bishop of the Isles, who had previously had jurisdiction over Galloway; but the new bishopric survived, and York had a new suffragan, an important step in the battle between York and Canterbury over the primacy, which was mainly a battle over the prestige of their respective sees. The number of bishops subject to either archbishop was an important factor in the reputation of each. In 1133, Thurstan, who had received papal permission to found an entirely new diocese, consecrated Æthelwold as the first bishop of the new see of Carlisle.

Thurstan refused to accept that the new Archbishop of Canterbury, William de Corbeil, was his superior, and did not help with William's consecration. The dispute between the two continued, and both archbishops carried their complaints in person to Rome twice. In 1126, Pope Honorius II ruled in favour of York. The pope based his decision on the fact that Canterbury's supporting documents had been forged.

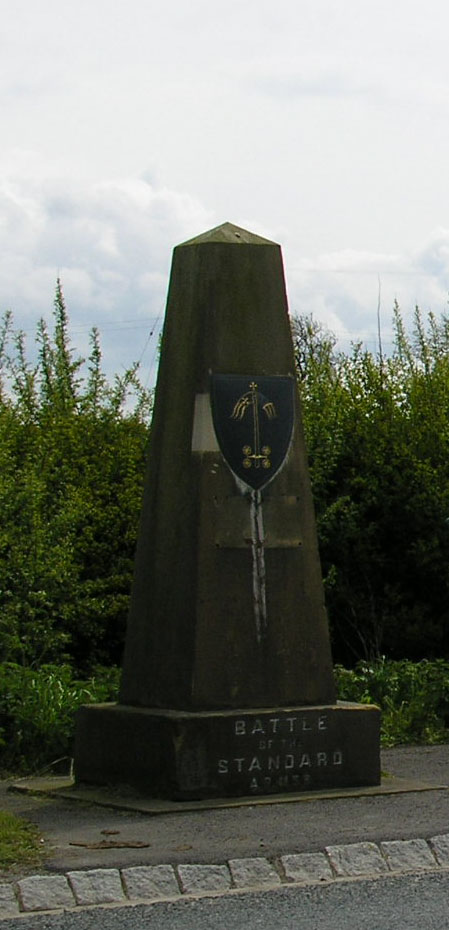
A monument at the site of the Battle of the Standard, where the troops Thurstan had mustered defeated the Scots.

Thurstan supported King Stephen after Henry I's death in 1135, and appeared at Stephen's first court at Easter held at Westminster. Thurstan negotiated a truce at Roxburgh in 1138 between England and Scotland. It was Thurstan who mustered the army which defeated the Scots at the Battle of the Standard on 22 August 1138 near Northallerton, Yorkshire. Thurstan did not take direct part in the battle., but he created the standard that gave the battle its name, by putting a ship's mast in a cart and hanging the banners of Saint Peter of York, Saint John of Beverley, and Saint Wilfrid of Ripon on the mast. The Scots had invaded, attempting to aid the Empress Matilda, the daughter of Henry I and Stephen's rival for the throne. On 21 January 1140 Thurstan resigned his see and entered the order of the Cluniacs at Pontefract, and he died there on 6 February 1140. He was buried in the church at Pontefract.

== Saint ==
In 2024 evidence emerged that Thurstan had been acclaimed as a saint: his name was found, associated with a feast day of 6 February, in an ancient catalogue of saints' days at Pontefract Priory. At the time, the pope's approval was not needed for sainthood; the monks at Pontefract exhumed his body two years after his death and, finding it well-preserved, acclaimed him as a saint. This detail was lost in the destruction of monasteries' possessions during the Reformation.

== Legacy ==
Thurstan gave land to many of the churches of his diocese and founded several religious houses. He founded the first nunnery in Yorkshire when he founded St Clement's between 1125 and 1133. He obtained for Whitby Abbey a papal privilege of protection, as well as giving his privilege to the abbey. He also helped found the Cistercian Abbey of Fountains, by giving the site to monks who had been expelled from the Abbey of St. Mary's, York. Thurstan helped the hermitess Christina of Markyate at several points in her career, and tried to persuade her to become the first prioress of his foundation of St. Clement's. He was a patron to the Augustinian Hexham Priory, founded by his predecessor at York, as well as helping the foundation of Bridlington Priory, another Augustinian house. He was a sincere reformer and opposed to the election of unfit men to the episcopacy. When Pope Innocent II asked Thurstan's opinion on the elevation of Anselm of St Saba, who was Abbot of Bury St. Edmunds, to become Bishop of London, Thurstan replied, "If we consider his life and reputation, it would be much more fitting to remove him from his abbacy than to promote him to be bishop of London." Anselm was not confirmed as bishop.

Thurstan is described by the historian Edmund King as "a bishop like no other. Thurstan and the baronage of Yorkshire had been partners in a common enterprise, their security in this world and their salvation in the next, and to all aspects of his role he had shown a complete commitment." His death occurred during The Anarchy of the civil war between Stephen and Matilda and led to a breakdown in order.

Thurstan's nephew was Osbert de Bayeux, who became an archdeacon at York, and in 1154 was accused of the murder of William of York, one of Thurstan's successors at York.

== Citations ==
Catholic Church titles
Preceded by Thomas II	Archbishop of York; 1119–1140	Succeeded by William of York
