= Hugh the Chanter =

12th-century clergyman and historian

Hugh Sottovagina (died c. 1140), often referred to as Hugh the Chanter or Hugh the Chantor, was a historian for York Minster during the 12th century and was probably an archdeacon during the time of his writing. He was the author of the Latin text known as the History of the Church of York.
