= Saint Swithun (disambiguation) =

Saint Swithin or Swithun (died 862) was an Anglo-Saxon bishop of Winchester, after whom is named a British weather lore proverb.

Saint Swithin or variant spellings may also refer to:

- Saint Swithun in popular culture
- Saint Swithun Wells, executed during the reign of Elizabeth I of England (died 1591)
- Eliza Gutch (1840–1931), who wrote to Notes and Queries under the pseudonym St Swithin

== See also ==
- Saint Swithin's Day (disambiguation)
