= Walkelin =

11th-century Bishop of Winchester

- Bishop of Winchester
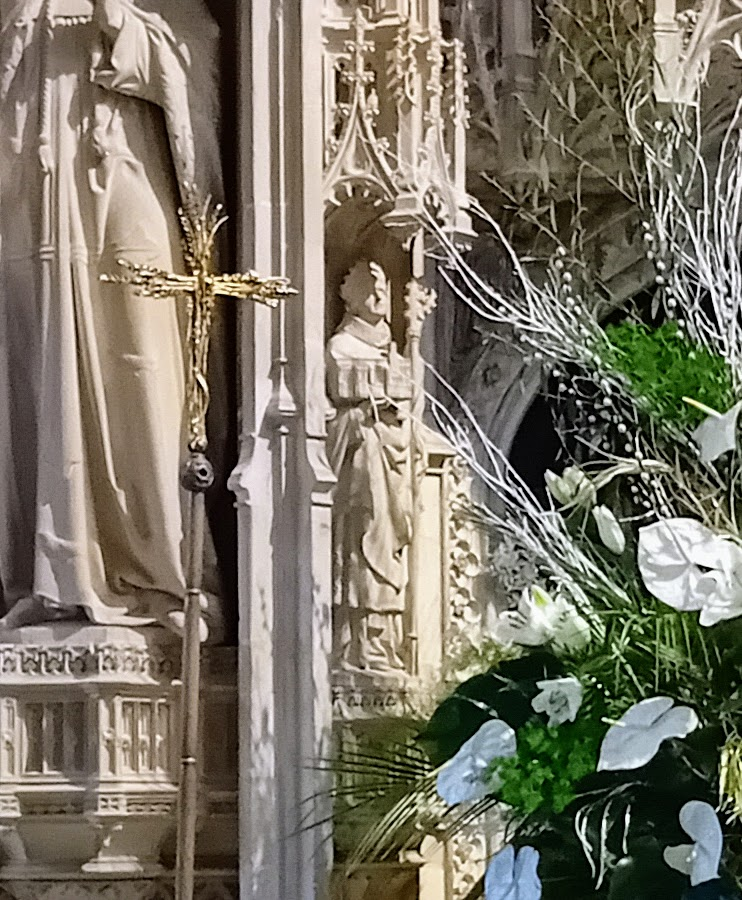
- Statue of Walkelin on the Great Screen of Winchester Cathedral
- Appointed: 23 May 1070
- Term ended: 3 January 1098
- Predecessor: Stigand
- Successor: William Giffard

Orders
- Consecration: 30 May 1070 by Ermenfrid

Personal details
- Died: 3 January 1098
- Buried: Winchester Cathedral
- Denomination: Catholic

Walkelin (Note: Or Walchelin/Walchelyn (English/Norman-French), Vauquelin (Norman-French), or Walcalinus/Walklynus (Latin).) (d. 1098) was the first Norman Bishop of Winchester. He began the construction of Winchester Cathedral in 1079 and had the Old Minster demolished. He reformed the cathedral's administration, although his plan to replace the monks with priests was blocked by the Archbishop of Canterbury, Lanfranc. Walkelin was important in beginning St Giles's Fair in Winchester and was greatly active in national politics. For example, he signed the Accord of Winchester, was involved in the Council of London in 1075, and sought to resolve a conflict between Anselm of Canterbury and William II. He was regent of England for a few months at the end of his life.

== Early career ==
Walkelin was probably not related to William the Conqueror, whom he served as a royal chaplain. Before the Norman Conquest, he was probably a canon at Rouen Cathedral.

In April 1070, at the Council of Winchester, papal legates deposed Stigand as Bishop of Winchester. He had been excommunicated by five different popes for pluralism, as he was Archbishop of Canterbury at the same time as being Bishop of Winchester. Walkelin was nominated to be bishop on 23 May 1070 and was consecrated on 30 May by the papal legate Ermenfrid.

== Bishop of Winchester ==
=== Reform ===
Walkelin aimed to replace the monks in the cathedral with priests, in a chapter of canons. Since most of the money was going to the monks, this change, for which he had royal approval, would have helped him to fund his household and any future construction projects. However, Lanfranc, a monk who had just been consecrated as Archbishop of Canterbury by a selection of bishops including Walkelin himself, opposed the change, and succeeded in blocking it.

According to his successor William Giffard, to raise funds in a different way, Walkelin divided the assets of the see between himself and the monastery and appropriated some of the monks' land and patronages. Walkelin required the consent of the Prior of Winchester for these changes. However, as he had previously made his brother Simeon the prior, this consent was easier to obtain.

Nevertheless, the Annals of Winchester say that Walkelin improved the cathedral and monastery "in the devotion and number of its monks and in the buildings of the house". (Note: Ecclesiam Wintoniensem in religione et numero monachorum et in domorum aedificiis plurimum melioravit — Winchester Annals)

=== Construction ===
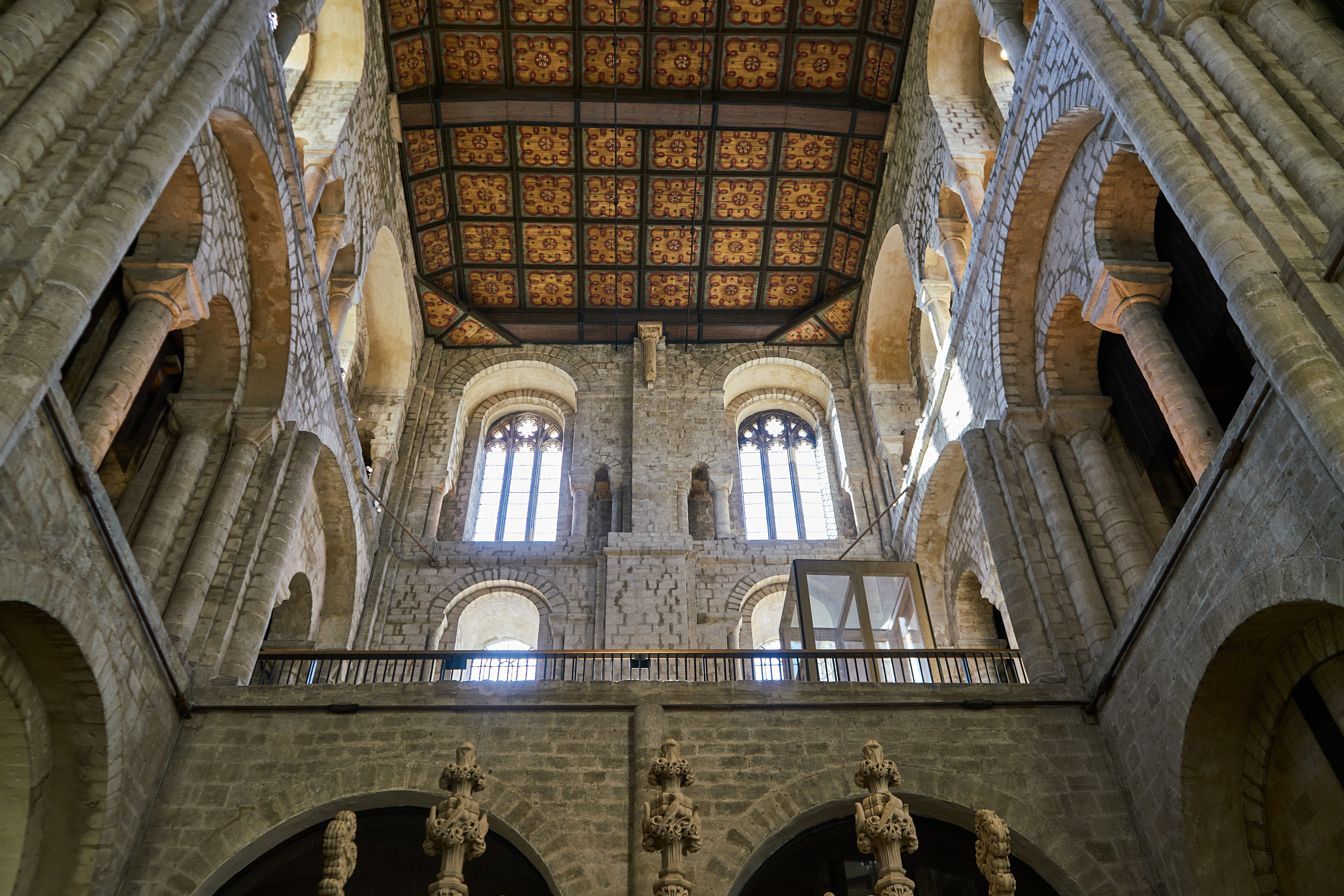
South transept of Winchester Cathedral, mostly constructed under Walkelin

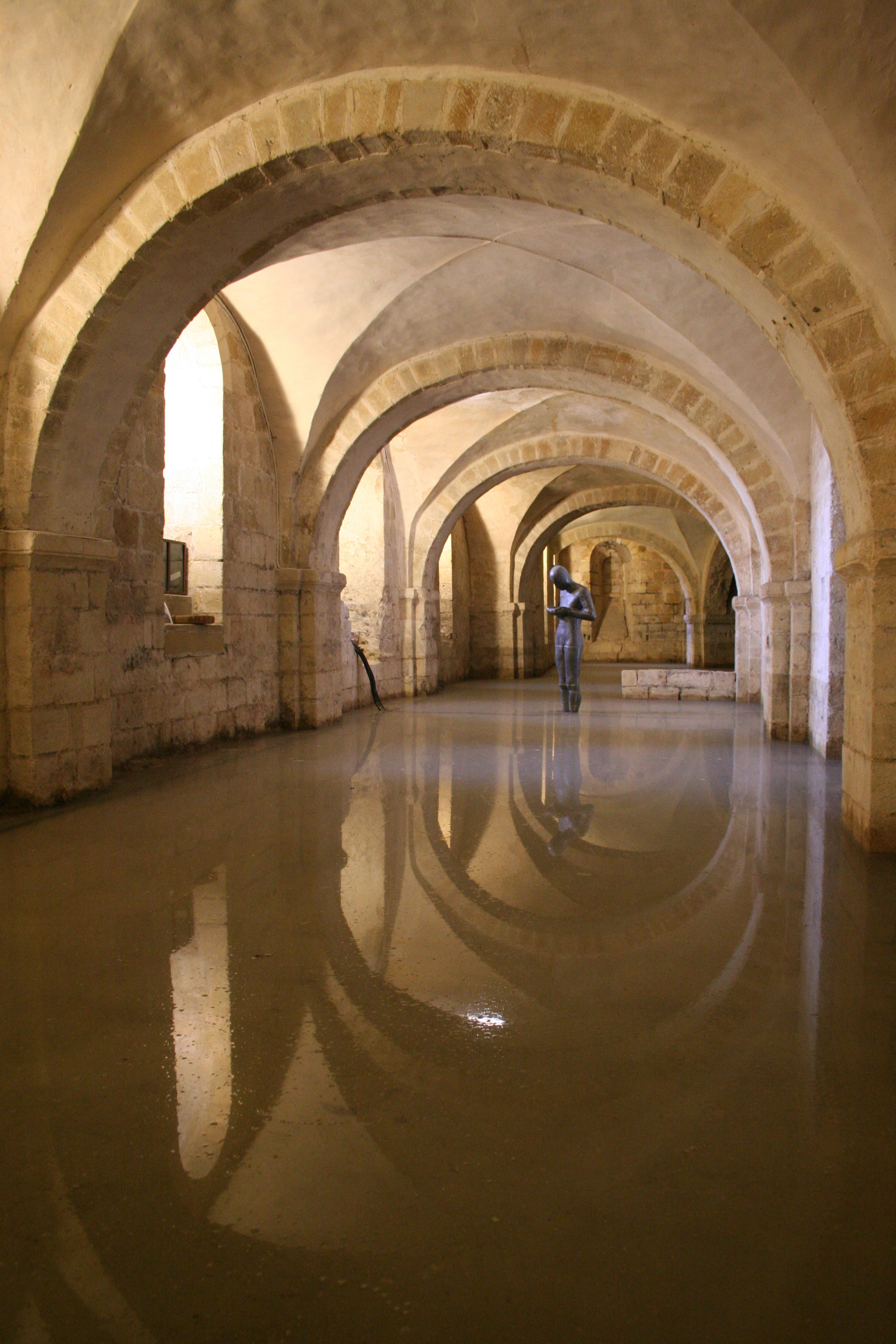
Crypt of Winchester Cathedral, constructed during Walkelin's time as Bishop

Walkelin began work on a new cathedral church, the current Winchester Cathedral, in 1079, to replace the Old Minster. Walkelin's project was of a monumental scale, with a length of almost 180 yards, almost unrivalled by other contemporaneous projects. The construction was in a Romanesque style. The current transepts, crypt and some parts of the nave of the cathedral church are from Walkelin's initial construction. The tower collapsed in 1107 and was rebuilt with a similar design later.

The monks moved into the completed parts of the new building in 1093, along with the relics of St Swithun in a feretory, allowing the demolition of the Old Minster to begin. It is most likely that the initial construction was completed under William Giffard in around 1122.

The Annals of Winchester relate a tale about Walkelin gathering timber for the construction of the cathedral church. In 1086, William I reportedly granted Walkelin as much from a certain wood as his carpenters could take in three or four days. In response, the bishop gathered lots of carpenters and cut the whole wood down within the allotted time, angering the king. Walkelin avoided his wrath by putting on "an old cape" (Note: Vetusta capa — Winchester Annals) and begging that he would retain his royal friendship and chaplaincy, even if he lost his role as Bishop of Winchester. This appeased the king, and Walkelin remained bishop. In the Oxford DNB, Michael J. Franklin uses the story to suggest that Walkelin and William had a close friendship.

=== Politics ===
Walkelin was a significant religious leader outside of his diocese. He was one of the bishops that consecrated Lanfranc as Archbishop of Canterbury in 1070, attended the Council of London in 1075 and was a signatory of the Accord of Winchester. He officiated at the translation of the bones of St Edmund, St Botolph and St Fermin by Abbot Baldwin and the consecration of the new abbey building at Bury St Edmunds in April 1095, in place of the local Bishop of Thetford, Herbert de Losinga. Walkelin issued an indulgence to all who visited the shrine of Edmund.

Like most Bishops of Winchester, Walkelin was involved in royal and secular politics. He attested many royal charters under both William I and William II. Walkelin was one of William II's magnates. He appears to have been in charge of the king's financial affairs, overseeing the royal treasury in Winchester's castle. He dealt with a rebellion of monks at St Augustine's Abbey in Canterbury in 1089, alongside Gundulf of Rochester. In 1096, he was in charge of a judicial circuit, hearing royal pleas. He organised the geld in 1096. He tried to persuade Anselm, Archbishop of Canterbury, to drop his demand to be allowed to travel to Rome in a dispute with William II in 1097. After the consecration of Battle Abbey in 1094 at which Walkelin was present, William II granted permission for St Giles's Fair, one of the largest medieval fairs of England, which proved very important for Winchester's economy. Walkelin was regent of England along with Ranulf Flambard in November 1097, during William II's trip to Rome.

== Death ==
Walkelin died on 3 January 1098. According to Thomas Rudborne, he was buried in the nave of the cathedral, before the rood-loft, and his epitaph was:

Original Latin	English Translation
Praesul Walklynus istic requiescit humatus	Bishop Walkelin rests here interred
Tempore Willelmi Conquestoris cathedratus	Enthroned in the time of William the Conqueror

== Family ==
Walkelin's brother, Simeon, was a monk in Rouen, then the Prior of Winchester, and then Abbot of Ely, where he began the construction of the current Ely Abbey church. Walkelin had made Simeon the Prior of Winchester. As noted above, this had helped him to divide assets between the monks and his household.

Walkelin's nephew, Gerard, was Precentor of Rouen, then Bishop of Hereford from 1096, and finally Archbishop of York from 1100. He was Lord Chancellor from 1085 to 1092, under both William I and William II.

== Notes ==
Catholic Church titles
Preceded by Stigand	Bishop of Winchester; 1070–1098	Succeeded by William Giffard
