= St Swithun's Church =

St Swithun's Church (alternative spelling Swithin), named after St Swithun who was an Anglo-Saxon bishop of Winchester, can refer to numerous churches:

== United Kingdom ==
- St Swithun's Church, Great Dalby, Leicestershire
- St Swithun's Church, Allington, Dorset
- Church of St Swithin, Bath, Somerset
- St Swithun's Church, Bathford, Somerset
- Church of St Swithin, Bicker, Lincolnshire
- St Swithun's Church, Bintree, Norfolk
- St Swithun's Church, Bournemouth, Dorset
- St Swithun's Church, Brookthorpe, Gloucestershire
- St Swithun's Church, Cheswardine, Shropshire
- St Swithun's Church, Clunbury, Shropshire
- St Swithun's Church, Combe, Berkshire
- St Swithin's Church, Compton Bassett, Wiltshire
- St Swithun's Church, Crampmoor, Hampshire
- St Swithun's Church, East Grinstead, West Sussex
- St Swithun's Church, East Retford, Nottinghamshire
- Church of St Swithin, Ganarew, Herefordshire
- St Swithun's Church, Great Chishill, Cambridgeshire
- St Swithun's Church, Headbourne Worthy, Hampshire
- St Swithun's Church, Hinton Parva, Wiltshire
- St Swithun's Church, Hither Green, London
- St Swithin's Church, Holmesfield, Derbyshire
- St Swithun's Churches, Kennington, Oxfordshire
- St Swithun's Church, Kirklington, Nottinghamshire
- St Swithun's Church, Leonard Stanley, Gloucestershire
- St Swithin's Church, Lincoln, Lincolnshire
- St Swithun's Church, Littleham, Devon
- St Swithin, London Stone, former church in the City of London
- St Swithun's Church, Martyr Worthy, Hampshire
- St Swithun's Church, Merton, Oxfordshire
- St. Swithun's, Nately Scures, Hampshire
- St Swithin's Church, Pyworthy, Devon
- St Swithun's Church, Sandy, Bedfordshire
- St Swithun's Church, Shobrooke, Devon, England
- St Swithun's Church, Swanbourne, Buckinghamshire
- St Swithun's Church, Thorley, Isle of Wight
- St Swithin's Church, Wellow, Nottinghamshire
- St Swithun-upon-Kingsgate Church, Winchester, Hampshire
- St Swithun's Church, Woodborough, Nottinghamshire
- St Swithun's Church, Woodbury, Devon
- St Swithun's Church, Worcester
- St Swithin's Church, Magherafelt, Londonderry, Northern Ireland

== Elsewhere ==
- St Svithun's Church, Stavanger, Norway
- Stavanger Cathedral, Norway, The cathedral was dedicated to Saint Swithun
- St Swithun's Church, Saint Lucy, Barbados
