= Council of Winchester =

Council of Winchester can refer to the following church councils (synods) convened in Winchester:

- Council of Winchester (1070), at which several bishops and abbots were deposed
- Council of Winchester (1072), which attempted to settle the question of the primacy of the Archbishop of Canterbury
