= Thomas Rudborne =

English Benedictine monk and chronicler

Thomas Rudborne was an English Benedictine monk of St Swithun's Priory, Winchester, and a chronicler writing in the middle of the fifteenth century.

His Historia major Wintoniensis covers the period 164 AD to 1138, and is centred on the Old Minster at Winchester. He cites carefully from English chronicles, including those by Marianus Scotus, Martinus Polonus, Henry of Huntingdon and Ranulf Higden. Thomas was important in promulgating the stories that had become associated with the legacy of King Alfred the Great during the Middle Ages, such as his supposed founding of University of Oxford, his reputed status as the 'first anointed king of England', and his generosity to Winchester's ecclesiastical institutions. Thomas also includes legendary and hagiographical material related to Saint Swithun in his history.

== Sources ==
- Firth, Matthew (2024). "What's in a Name? Tracing the Origins of Alfred's 'the Great'". English Historical Review. doi:10.1093/ehr/ceae078. ISSN 1477-4534.
- Gransden, Antonia (1996). Historical Writing in England: c. 500 to c. 1307. Vol. 2. London: Routledge. ISBN 0-4151-5124-4.
