= Coronation of King William =

Coronation of King William may refer to:

- Coronation of William I in 1066
- Coronation of William IV in 1831
