= St Swithun's Church, Thorley =

Coordinates: 50°41′49″N 01°28′12″W

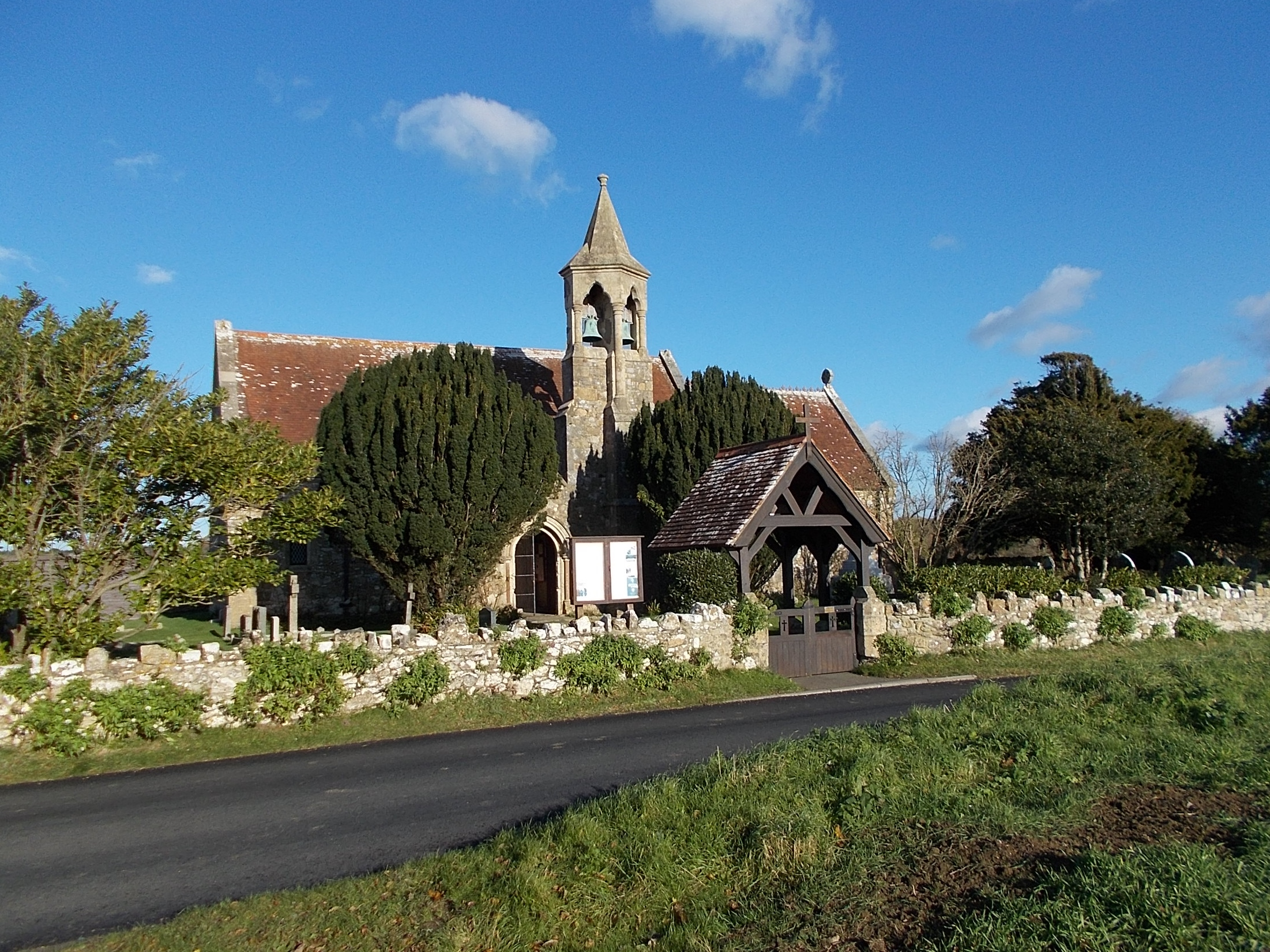
- St Swithun's Church, Thorley
- Denomination: Church of England
- Churchmanship: Broad Church

History
- Dedication: St Swithun

Administration
- Province: Canterbury
- Diocese: Portsmouth
- Parish: Thorley, Isle of Wight

St Swithun's Church, Thorley is a parish church in the Church of England located in Thorley, Isle of Wight.

== History ==
The church dates from 1871 and was designed by the architect W. J. Stratton.

Of the ancient church of St Swithun the only portion remaining is the porch and belfry standing within a small disused graveyard adjacent to Thorley Manor. The present church, a stone structure with a late 13th-century motif, was erected by subscription on a site further east, nearer the village centre, and consecrated 9 December 1871. It consists of nave, chancel, north and south transepts, and a tower in which hang the two 13th-century bells from the old church, inscribed in Lombardic letter 'Wallerandus Trenchard et Johannes Rector Ecclesie.' In the vestry is a 17th-century altar-table, formerly in the old church.

The churchyard contains the Commonwealth war grave of a Royal Air Force airman of World War II.

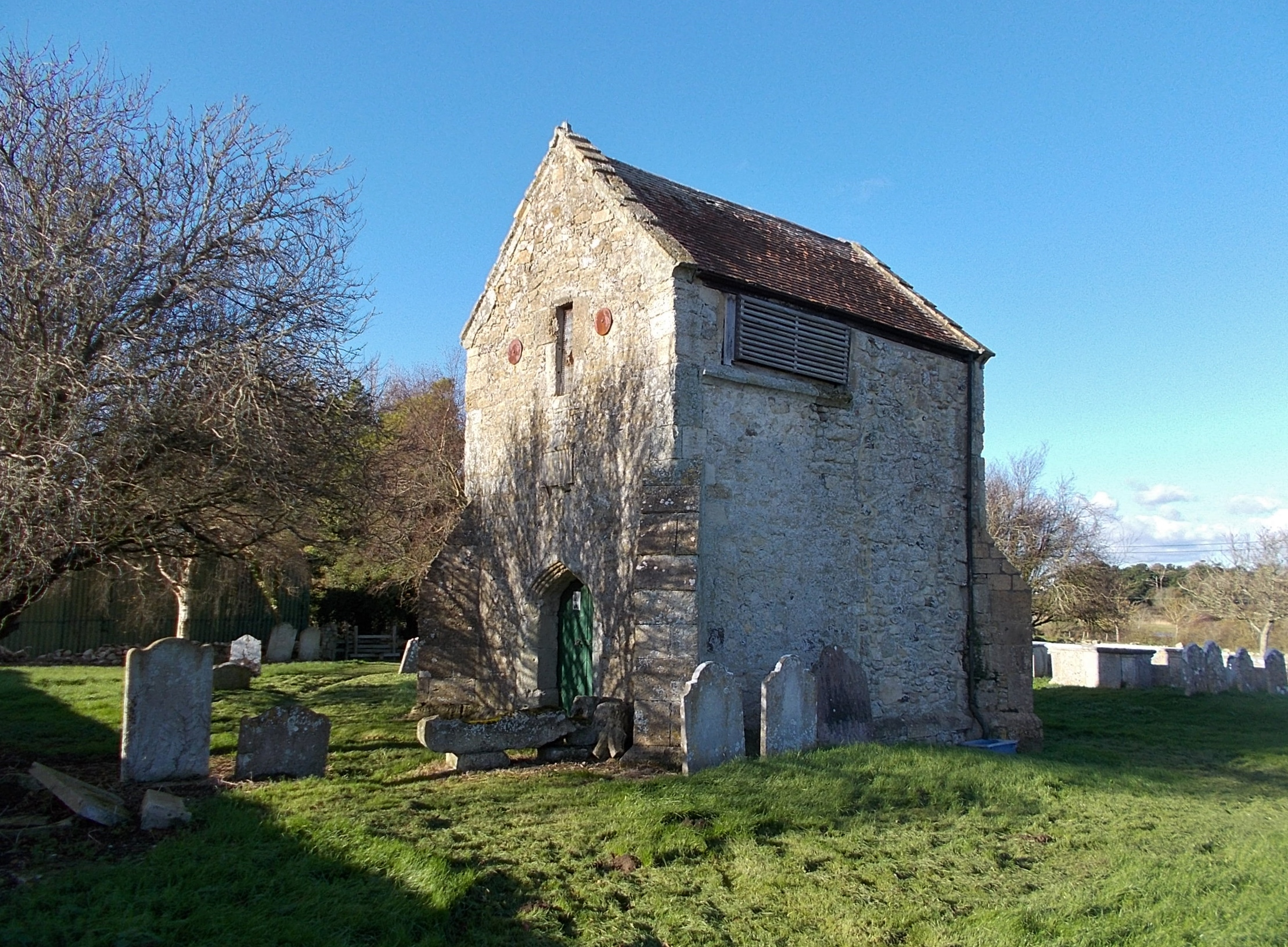
The remains of the old church, which lies about half a mile to the west

== Organ ==
The pipe organ dates from 1875 by the builder Forster and Andrews. A specification of the organ can be found on the National Pipe Organ Register.

The historic value of the organ has been noted by the British Institute of Organ Studies which has awarded it an Historic Organ Certificate.
