= Winchester Cathedral Priory =

Monastery in Winchester, England

Coordinates: 51.0613°N 1.3134°W

- The ruined chapter house, looking west
- Interactive map of Winchester Cathedral Priory

Monastery information
- Order: Benedictine
- Established: 964
- Disestablished: 1539
- Mother house: Abingdon Abbey
- Dedication: Holy Trinity, Saint Peter and Saint Paul; Saint Swithun
- Diocese: Diocese of Winchester

People
- Founders: Bishop Æthelwold and King Edgar
- Important associated figures: Swithun

Site
- Location: Winchester, Hampshire, England

Winchester Cathedral Priory was a Benedictine monastery attached to Winchester Cathedral, providing the clergy for the church. Cenwealh son of Cynegils is credited with constructing the Old Minster of Winchester in the 640s, and a new bishopric was created in the 660s with Wine as the first bishop. Although attacked by the Vikings in 860 and 879, the monastery survived and recovered.

The former prior's house, with the cathedral church behind.

In 964, during the episcopate of Bishop Æthelwold, the Minster's secular priests were replaced by Benedictine monks from Abingdon Abbey, establishing the cathedral priory. Originally intended for 70 monks, the community declined to 62 monks in 1262 and to 29 in 1495, recovering slightly in the following century, with either 33 or 45 monks when the monastery was dissolved on 15 November 1539. Some of the priory buildings survive within the present cathedral close, including the ruined chapter house and the prior's house (now the Deanery).

The priory controlled the Sister Hospital at Winchester, and maintained a school.

The house was originally dedicated to the Holy Trinity, and Saint Peter and Saint Paul. A dedication to Saint Swithun, a 9th-century bishop, was added later.

== Codex Wintoniensis ==
The Codex Wintoniensis ('Winchester Codex') is a 12th century cartulary of Anglo Saxon Charters. It is held in the British Library additional manuscript collection number 15350. Its contents were published by the Codex Diplomaticus Aevi Saxonici in 1847.
