= Coronation oath of the British monarch =

Oath of office taken by the UK monarch

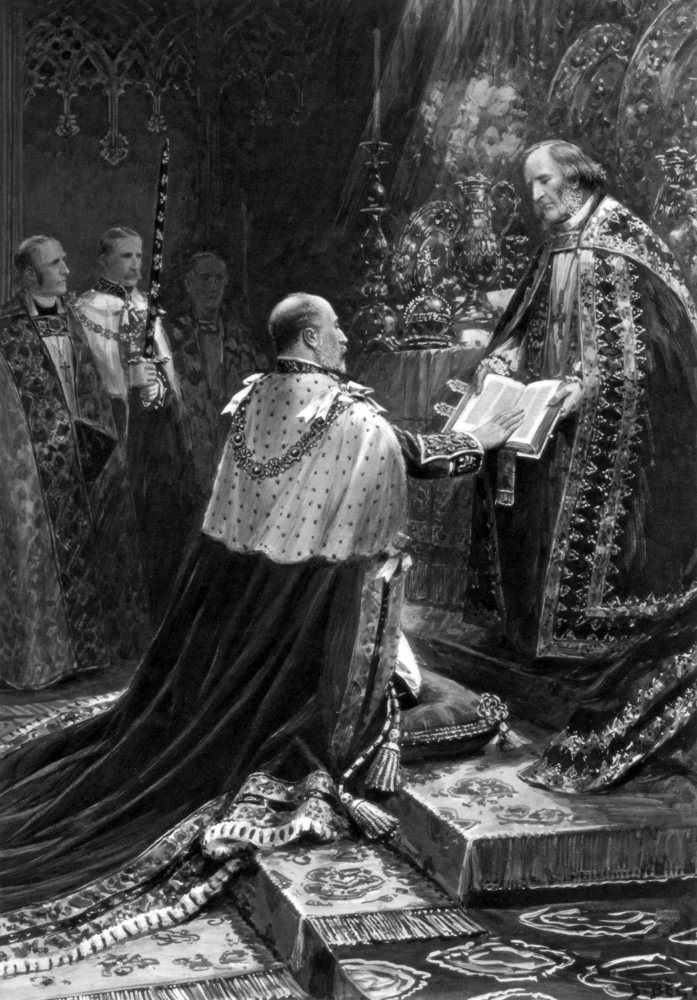
King Edward VII taking the oath at his coronation in 1902.

A coronation oath is a solemn oath of office taken by the monarch of the United Kingdom at their coronation. An oath has been included in coronation ceremonies since the earliest kings of the English in the 10th century and its form was fixed by Act of Parliament in the 17th century. Minor amendments have subsequently been made to the oath to reflect the changing status of the United Kingdom, and also the Commonwealth Realms which have the British monarch as their head of state. The oath has three parts; the first to govern in compliance with the laws and customs of the people, the second to govern justly, and the third, to uphold Protestant Christianity and the rights of the Church of England, reflecting the monarch's role as Supreme Governor of the Church of England.

== Origins ==
The form of coronation service used in England has undergone a number of revisions over the centuries. These versions are known as ordines (from the Latin ordo meaning "order") or recensions. The earliest known text of an English coronation service, the First Rescension, is preserved in the 10th century Leofric Missal. It is uncertain for certain whether this version was ever used in England, but it was possibly used in the Kingdom of Sussex in the mid-9th century or even earlier. Whatever its usage, this text contains the first coronation oath or promissio regis in three parts, the tria praecepta or three pledges given by the monarch to God:

- The Church of God and all the people would hold true peace under his rule.
- He would forbid acts of robbery and iniquity.
- He would uphold justice and mercy in all judgements.

The same form of the oath was retained in the Second Rescension, which is traditionally ascribed to Saint Dunstan for King Edgar's coronation at Bath Abbey in 973 AD. However, in this and later versions, the position of the oath in the liturgy moved from being the final element of the service to one of the first, before the consecration, anointing and crowning.

At the coronation of William the Conqueror in 1066, two primary sources agree that William took the oath after, rather than before the anointing, although before the crowning, apparently to emphasise the sanctity of his undertaking. At some stage between then and the coronation of King Stephen in 1135, the Third Rescension came into use, abandoning much of the Anglo-Saxon liturgy in favour of that used by the Holy Roman Emperors, but retaining the English triple oath, which returned to the start of the service. From the coronation of Richard I onwards, there was considerable variation in the actual text of the oath. The second clause to forbid crime was replaced by the third and a new third clause was introduced, swearing to uphold good laws and customs. Edward I additionally swore to preserve the rights of the crown. The lawyer Henry de Bracton reported the oath made by Henry III at his coronations at Gloucester Cathedral in 1216 and at Westminster in 1220, which largely conforms with the traditional triple formula:

- In the first place that he will enjoin and as far as in his power lies the king take care, that a true peace shall be maintained for the church of God and all Christian people at all time.
- Secondly, that he will interdict all rapacities and other iniquities in all grades.
- Thirdly, that in all judgments he will enjoin equity and mercy, so that a clement and merciful God may indulge him with his mercy, so that all persons may enjoy a firm peace through his justice.

In 1308, the final major revision of the liturgy, the Fourth Rescension, preserved in the Liber Regalis and other manuscripts, was used at the coronation of Edward II. Constitutional reforms beginning with Magna Carta in 1215 and the subsequent establishment of the Parliament of England were reflected in the reordered oath that Edward was obliged to take, which had a fourth clause promising to uphold any future laws made "by the community of the realm".

Although the oath is recorded in surviving coronation ordo manuscripts in Latin, by reference to other contemporary sources it seems probable that at least from 1308 onwards, it was spoken by the archbishop and the king in Norman French using a free translation, so that the attending barons could easily understand it. At some time in the 15th century, Middle English displaced French.

== Early modern period ==
In the 1520s, Henry VIII drew up a revised oath, which would have radically altered the relationship between the crown and the church; in the proposed text, the king promised to "kepe and mayntene the lawfull right and libertees of old tyme graunted by the righteous cristen kinges of Englond to the holie chirche of inglond not preiudyciall to his juysdiccion and dignite ryall". If Henry had intended this to be the oath taken by his only son, Edward VI, then it was not to be; despite being the first coronation since the start of the Reformation in England, Edward took the oath specified in the Liber Regalis in English but in the third clause, only promised to maintain "the laws and liberties of this realm" without any reference to the community. Interestingly, the actual method of swearing is described for the first time, with Edward making the oath at the altar with his hand on the sacramental bread, before moving his hand to the Bible for the final affirmation.

James VI of Scotland was an infant when he acceded to the Scottish throne, and at his coronation at Stirling in 1567, the oath was taken on his behalf by James Douglas, 4th Earl of Morton, and was an exact translation of the 1484 oath taken by Charles VIII of France, which emphasised the rights of the crown. After acceding to the English throne, his coronation at Westminster in 1603 was the first to be translated into English and followed closely the text of the Liber Regalis, including the final clause to uphold the rights of the community. To the first clause was added; "granted to the clergy and people by the glorious King, Saint Edward your predecessor". The same text was used at the coronation of Charles I in 1626, but the phrase "and people" was not included, an omission which was later used against Archbishop William Laud at his trial in 1643–44 following the English Civil War.

== Coronation Oath Act 1688 ==
In the wake of the Glorious Revolution which deposed James II, Parliament sought to legislate to make secure the Parliamentary sovereignty over the rights of the monarch. Even before formulating the Bill of Rights, Parliament passed the Coronation Oath Act 1688, which forced any future monarch to swear to uphold Protestantism and the rights of Parliament.

The wording stipulated in section 3 of the 1688 Act is:

Will You solemnely Promise and Sweare to Governe the People of this Kingdome of England and the Dominions thereto belonging according to the Statutes in Parlyament Agreed on and the Laws and Customs of the same?

Will You to Your power cause Law and Justice in Mercy to be Executed in all Your Judgements?

Will You to the utmost of Your power Maintaine the Laws of God the true Profession of the Gospell and the Protestant Reformed Religion Established by Law? And will You Preserve unto the Bishops and Clergy of this Realme and to the Churches committed to their Charge all such Rights and Priviledges as by Law doe or shall appertaine unto them or any of them?

After replying to each of the questions, the monarch is required to kiss the Bible and reply:

The things which I have here before promised I will performe and Keepe Soe help me God.

== Later amendments ==
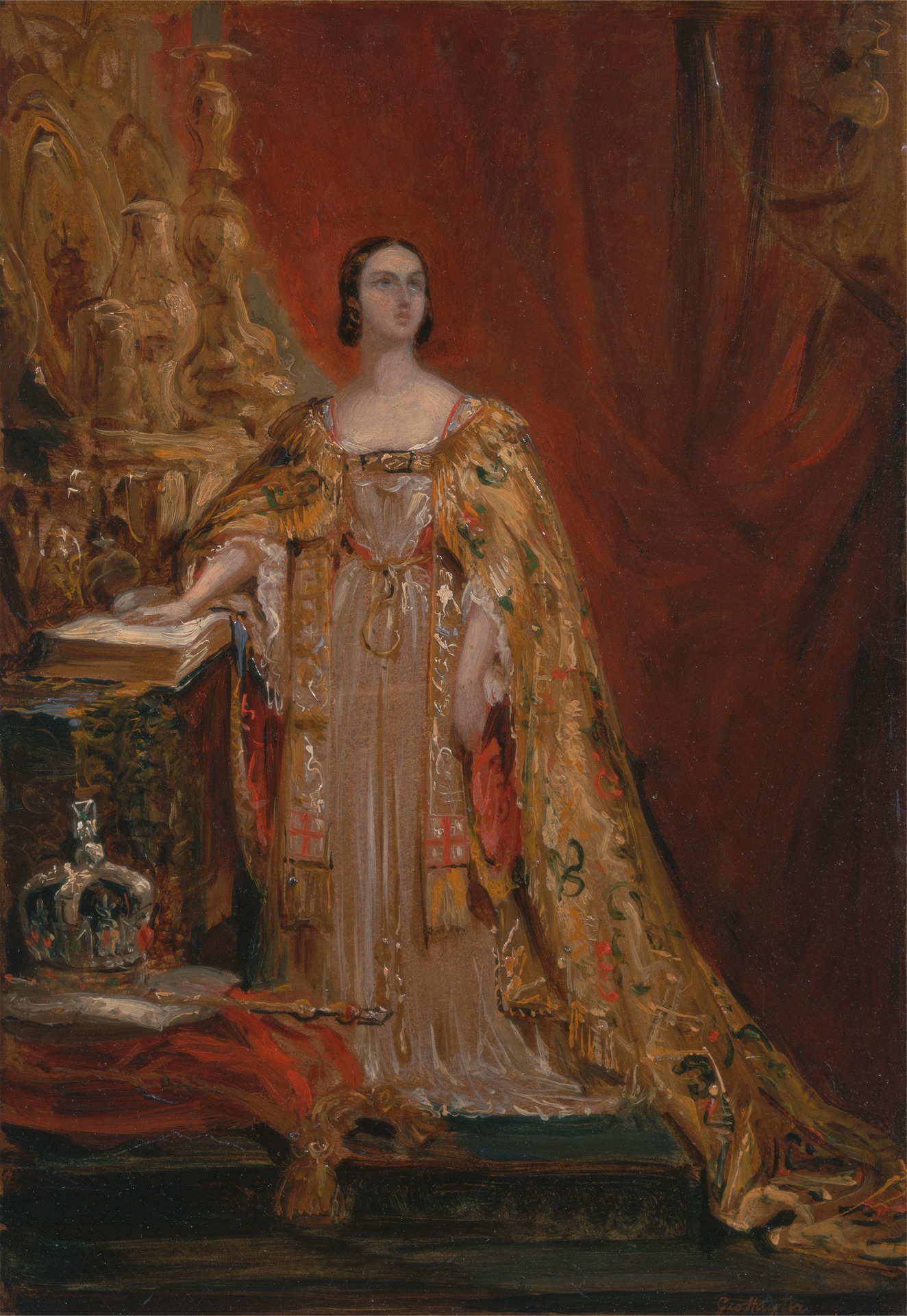
Queen Victoria Taking the Coronation Oath (1838), by George Hayter.

Although in theory, any deviation in the Coronation Oath from the text established in the 1688 Act is illegal, in practice, changes have repeatedly been made without Parliament amending the original Act, generally to reflect changes in the British constitution.

=== 1714 ===
The coronation of George I was the first following the Acts of Union 1707, by which the Kingdom of England and the Kingdom of Scotland, previously separate states in a personal union, were united into the single Kingdom of Great Britain. Accordingly, the first part of the oath was amended to:

...the people of this Kingdom of Great Britain...

A further amendment was required by the 1707 acts to clarify the third part of the oath relating to religion in England:

Will you maintain and preserve inviolably the said settlement of the Church of England and the doctrine, worship, discipline and government thereof as by law established within the kingdoms of England and Ireland, the dominion of Wales and town of Berwick upon Tweed and the territories thereunto belonging?

Reference to Wales and Berwick were omitted from the oath from 1821 onwards since subsequent legislation had specified that they were to be included in the term "England" for legal purposes.

=== 1821 ===
The coronation of George IV followed the Acts of Union 1800, which united the Kingdom of Ireland with Great Britain to form the United Kingdom of Great Britain and Ireland and also united the Church of England and the Anglican Church of Ireland as established churches. The oath was amended:

...the people of this United Kingdom of Great Britain and Ireland, and the dominions thereto belonging...

The third part was amended:

...preserve inviolably the settlement of the united Church of England and Ireland....

However, reference to the Church of Ireland was omitted after its disestablishment by the Irish Church Act 1869.

=== 1937 ===
Following the Statute of Westminster 1931 which granted almost complete autonomy to the five dominions, the oath taken at the coronation of George VI was amended to include their names separately:

Will you solemnly promise and swear to govern the peoples of Great Britain, Ireland, Canada, Australia, New Zealand, and the Union of South Africa, of your Possessions and the other Territories to any of them belonging or pertaining, and of your Empire of India, according to their respective Laws and Customs?

The third part was also controversially amended to reflect the dissestablishment of the Church in Wales in 1920 and to remove any implication that the Anglican church was the established church in the dominions:

Will you to the utmost of your power maintain the Laws of God and the true profession of the Gospel? Will you to the utmost of your power maintain in the United Kingdom the Protestant Reformed Religion established by law?

=== 1953 ===
The form of the oath was vigorously debated during preparations for the coronation of Elizabeth II. The Archbishop of Canterbury, Geoffrey Fisher, argued that the expanded list of Commonwealth realms should be condensed into a single formula, but this was rejected by the Commonwealth Relations Office. Randolph Churchill proposed that new legislation be considered to update the oath since it had strayed so far from the original text; however, the Lord Chancellor, Lord Simonds, wrote a confidential memorandum for the Coronation Committee stressing that no change to the law was required. Accordingly, the first part of the oath was:

Will you solemnly promise and swear to govern the Peoples of the United Kingdom of Great Britain and Northern Ireland, Canada, Australia, New Zealand, the Union of South Africa, Pakistan, and Ceylon, and of your Possessions and the other Territories to any of them belonging or pertaining, according to their respective laws and customs?

=== 2023 ===
Prior to the coronation of Charles III, the subject of revision of the oath was raised again. Both the King and the Archbishop of Canterbury, Justin Welby, felt that the religious element of the oath was too assertive and failed to acknowledge the need for mutual respect between faiths. The process of passing new legislation through Parliament would be lengthy and liable to raise devisive issues. Therefore, a preamble to be spoken by the Archbishop was added to the text:

Your Majesty, the Church established by law, whose settlement you will swear to maintain, is committed to the true profession of the Gospel, and, in so doing, will seek to foster an environment in which people of all faiths and beliefs may live freely. The Coronation Oath has stood for centuries and is enshrined in law. Are you willing to take the Oath?

The number of Commonwealth realms having risen to fifteen, the first part of the oath was amended to avoid reciting them individually:

Will you solemnly promise and swear to govern the Peoples of the United Kingdom of Great Britain and Northern Ireland, your other Realms and the Territories to any of them belonging or pertaining, according to their respective laws and customs?
