= Coronations of William the Conqueror and Matilda =

English coronations (1066–1070)

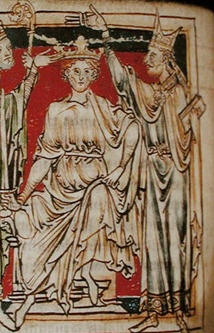
- The coronation of William I, a 13th-century illustration from Flores Historiarum by Matthew Paris
- Date: 25 December 1066; 959 years ago (William I); 11 May 1068; 958 years ago (Matilda)
- Location: Westminster Abbey, London, England
- Participants: William I of England; Matilda of Flanders; Stigand (archbishop of Canterbury); Ealdred (archbishop of York); Geoffrey de Montbray (bishop of Coutances); The Witan and other English nobles; Norman barons

The coronation of William the Conqueror as King of England took place at Westminster Abbey, London, on 25 December 1066, following the Norman Conquest of England. It was the first coronation which can be proved to have been held at Westminster. In May 1068, William's wife, Matilda of Flanders, was also crowned at the abbey. At Easter in 1070, William was crowned for a second time at Winchester by three papal legates, to confirm the acceptance of his rule by the Catholic Church.

== Background ==
William, Duke of Normandy, invaded England in support of his claim to the English throne at the end of September 1066. Having defeated King Harold Godwinson at the Battle of Hastings on 14 October, William conducted a campaign to subdue the south-east of England, which by early December had forced the surrender of the English nobility, the Witan, and their elected but uncrowned king, Edgar Ætheling, at Berkhamsted in Hertfordshire. The chronicler William of Poitiers, a chaplain in the ducal court, described the submission of the nobles:

...the bishops and the rest of the great men beg him to take the crown, saying that they are used to serving a king, and that they wished to have a king as lord.

According to William of Poitiers, this prompted a discussion amongst the barons in the Norman army as to whether William, a duke, ought to accept the throne of England; but they soon decided that having William as king would legitimise their future claims on English lands.

The Normans held the view, based on the practice of the French Capetian dynasty, that a king's reign only started with his coronation, and therefore there was some urgency in arranging the ceremony. In the meantime, Norman bishops issued penances to the Norman soldiers of one year for each English person they had killed; this comparatively mild penalty was due to there being a publicum bellicum or "public war", a status that would end at William's coronation.

While preparations for the coronation were underway, Norman troops began work on a fortress, later the Tower of London, to control the capital.

== Service ==
The form of coronation service used in England has undergone a number of revisions over the centuries. These versions are known as ordines (Latin, nominative plural of ordo meaning "order") or recensions. In the case of William's coronation, scholars have debated whether the liturgy used in 1066 was an amended version of the Second Recension, devised by Saint Dunstan for King Edgar's coronation in 973 AD, or the Third Recension, heavily influenced by continental practices, which is known to have been used at the coronation of King Stephen in 1135.

William's coronation is the first which can be proved to have been held at Westminster Abbey; although King Harold Godwinson was almost certainly crowned at the newly consecrated abbey in January 1066, this is not specifically confirmed by any contemporary source. The choice of using the abbey founded by King Edward the Confessor was probably intended to reinforce William's claim to be the rightful successor to Edward, this was despite the nave of the church still being under construction. The date chosen, Christmas Day, Monday 25 December, was in imitation of the customary date for the coronations of the eastern Byzantine emperors and the western Holy Roman emperors.

There is a fairly detailed description of the ceremony by Guy, bishop of Amiens in the finale of his epic poem, Carmen de Hastingae Proelio ("Song of the Battle of Hastings"), which was probably written in 1067. According to Guy, the ceremony began with a procession from the Palace of Westminster, also founded by Edward, to the abbey. In the procession, headed by a crucifer and accompanied by the chanting of the Lauds, William was preceded by the two leading churchmen of England, the archbishop of Canterbury, Stigand, and the archbishop of York, Ealdred. It would be the lower-ranking Ealdred who would officiate at the coronation, because Stigand had been excommunicated for holding two episcopal sees at once. They were assisted by Geoffrey de Montbray, the Norman bishop of Coutances.

Once inside the church, William was conducted to a raised dais, described by Guy as a pulpitum, probably located at the crossing beneath the central tower. This innovation, intended to physically and symbolically raise the king above his subjects, has been repeated at every coronation since. The ceremony began with Geoffrey asking the Norman nobles in French whether they accepted the new king "by your free choice", which was repeated in English by Ealdred to the Anglo-Saxon nobles. The resulting acclamation was mistaken by the Norman soldiers outside for a riot, to which they responded by setting fire to nearby houses; in the chaos, some soldiers began to fight the fire, others went looting.

Inside, the liturgy continued with the king and all the bishops prostrating themselves before the high altar while the Kyrie was chanted, followed by the anointing with oil of chrism. William then took the coronation oath, in which he promised "that he would rule all this people as well as the best of kings before him, if they would be loyal to him". This was a departure from the usual order, in which the oath preceded the anointing, the switch being probably made to emphasise the sanctity of the king's oath. The liturgy continued with the customary investiture with the regalia, enthronement and finally, Mass.

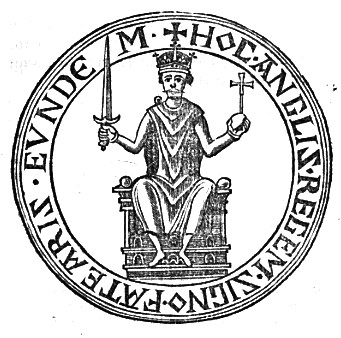
The seal of William I, showing him crowned and enthroned, holding a ceremonial sword and orb, symbols of temporal and spiritual power. The Latin text reads HOC ANGLIS REGEM SIGNO FATEARIS EUNDEM ("By this sign know the same William, king of the English")

In contrast to Guy's flattering poem, the English chronicler, Orderic Vitalis, later recorded the reaction of the congregation to the commotion outside:

...the people who had been rejoicing in the church were thrown into confusion, and a crowd of men and women of every rank and status, compelled by this disaster rushed out of the church. Only the bishops and clergy along with the monks stayed, terrified, in front of the altar and only just managed to complete the consecration rite over the king who was trembling violently.

The omission of this episode from Guy's Carmen may explain the abrupt ending of his text at the anointing, possibly indicating that it was edited at a later date.

=== Regalia ===
Guy of Amiens states that a Greek jeweller was employed to fashion a new crown for William. Sir Roy Strong suggests that this was likely to be in imitation of the imperial crowns used by Byzantine emperors, including pendilia, strings of jewels or pearls which hang from the sides of the crown in front of the wearer's ears. Guy lists the gems and semi-precious stones used in the crown, twelve in number, referencing the twelve jewels of the priestly breastplate worn by the High Priest of Israel. The crown, according to Guy, "flashed on all sides with a dazzling radiance". An orb and sceptre are shown on the Great Seal of Edward the Confessor, but Guy states that new ones were made for William by the same Greek craftsman.

== Coronation of Matilda ==
Following the coronation, William withdrew to Barking Abbey in Essex, pending the completion of the Tower of London which would fully subdue the hostile Londoners. There he received further submissions from English nobles and held a council, during which he distributed confiscated lands to his supporters. In February at the start of Lent, William began a triumphal return to Normandy where he reinstated his authority. By December, English dissent forced William back across the Channel to crush any armed opposition.

Having achieved this, William sent for his wife, Matilda of Flanders, who was ruling Normandy as regent and was probably pregnant at that time. Matilda arrived in England, accompanied by a "rich company of ladies and maidens", in time to celebrate Easter with William at Winchester on 23 March 1068. Matilda's coronation, the first for a queen consort of England after Edith of Wessex, was held at Westminster Abbey on Whit Sunday, 11 May. The liturgy followed a similar pattern to that of William and was conducted by Ealdred of York. If anything, the ceremony was more magnificent than her husband's had been. Following the coronation a state banquet was held, during which the King's Champion, Baron Marmion, challenged anyone who denied that William and Matilda were the rightful king and queen to trial by combat. This was a Norman tradition that was unknown to the English.

== Second coronation of William ==
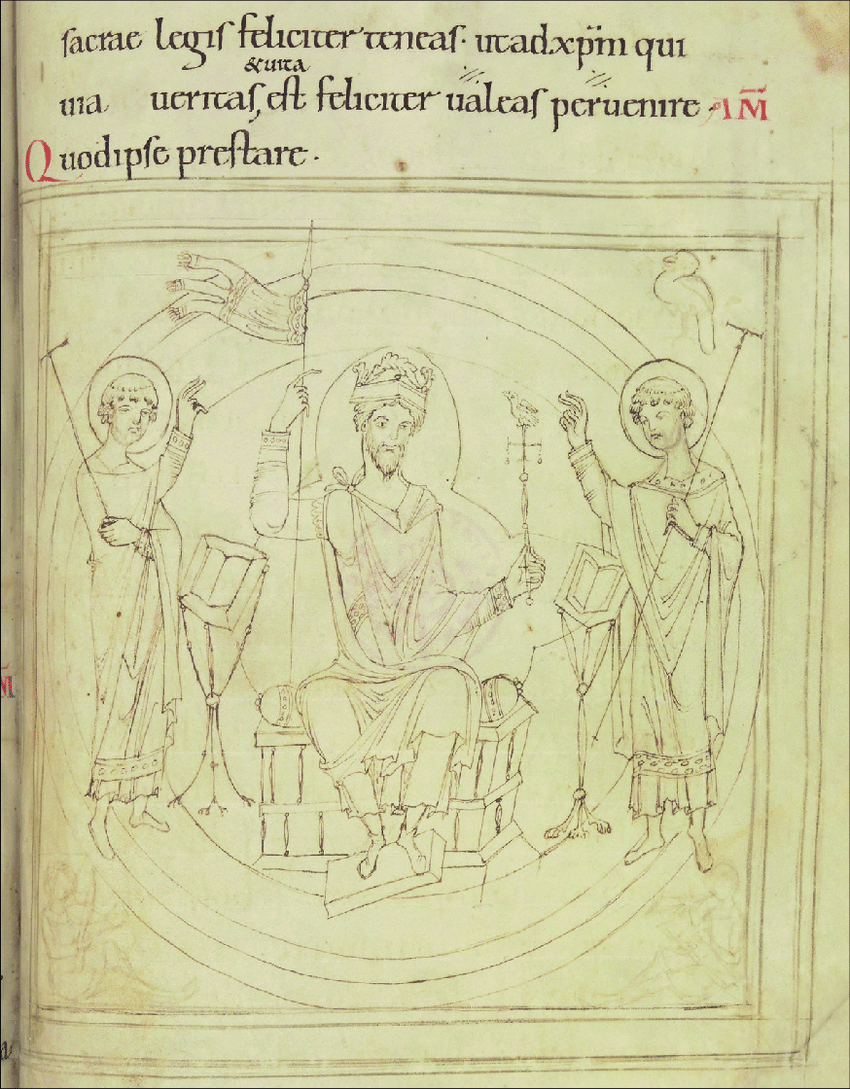
Drawing from a late 11th-century manuscript, the Ramsey Benedictional (Paris, Bibliothèque nationale de France, ms. latin 987, f. 111r), showing William the Conqueror's second coronation in the Old Minster, Winchester on 4 April 1070

During the years 1068 to 1070 William was much occupied in establishing his rule over England against the opposition of many of his Anglo-Saxon subjects, culminating in an abortive uprising in Yorkshire and the consequent Harrying of the North, and an attempted invasion by king Sweyn Estrithson of Denmark. In early 1070 Pope Alexander II, apparently at William's invitation, sent three legates to England: Ermenfrid, Bishop of Sion; Cardinal John Minutus, priest of Santa Maria in Trastevere; and Peter, probably also a cardinal and priest of San Crisogono. Once in England they issued summonses to appear at a church council in Winchester. On 4 April 1070, Easter Day, a few days before the council was convened, William was crowned for the second time at Winchester's Old Minster with the papal legates officiating. There is no mention of any swearing of oaths by or to the king, and William's legitimacy continued to rest on his first coronation, the ceremony's purpose being not to establish but to reaffirm his authority and his status as a favoured son of the Church.
