= Simeon (abbot) =

11th-century Norman abbot of Ely Abbey in England

Simeon (died 21 November 1093) was a relative of King William I of England and the brother of Walkelin, Bishop of Winchester. It was through his brother's influence that Simeon was made prior of Winchester, then in 1082 Abbot of Ely, where he began work on the present Ely Cathedral. He recovered for the monastery of Ely the lands which had been allotted to the Normans during their siege of the island of Ely when it was held by Hereward the Wake.

He died in 1093, at the age of 100. On his death the temporalities of the monastery were seized by Ralph Flambard, the minister of William Rufus, and no abbot was appointed until the accession of Henry I in 1100.
