= Thorley, Isle of Wight =

Coordinates: 50°41′49″N 1°28′23″W

Thorley
- Village
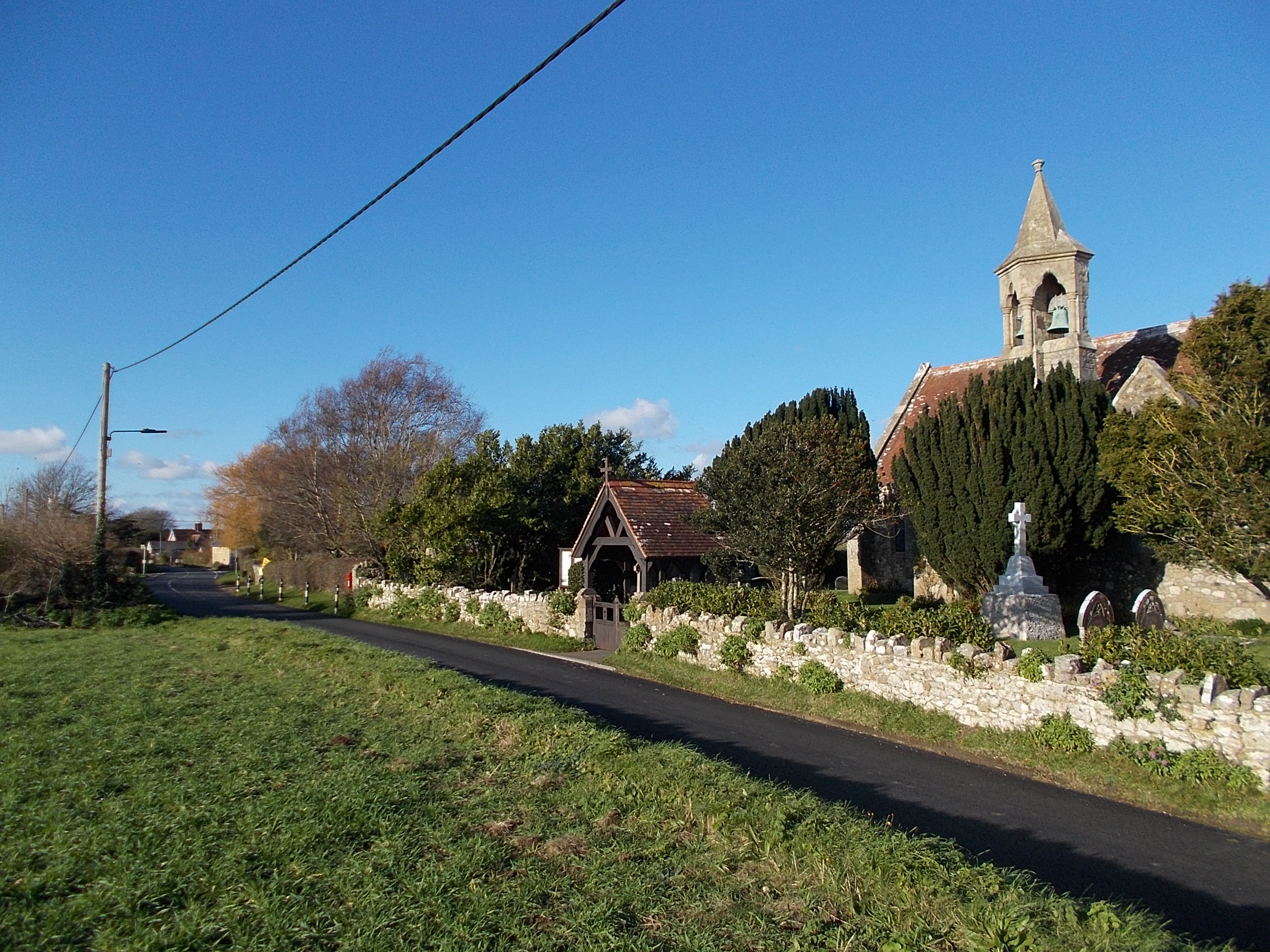
- 1871 St. Swithun's Church, Thorley

- Location within the Isle of Wight
- OS grid reference: SZ374 887
- Civil parish: Yarmouth
- Unitary authority: Isle of Wight
- Ceremonial county: Isle of Wight
- Region: South East
- Country: England
- Sovereign state: United Kingdom
- Post town: NEWPORT
- Postcode district: PO41
- Dialling code: 01983
- Police: Hampshire and Isle of Wight
- Fire: Hampshire and Isle of Wight
- Ambulance: Isle of Wight
- UK Parliament: Isle of Wight West

Thorley is a village in the civil parish of Yarmouth, on the Isle of Wight, England. It is 1 1/2 miles (2.4 km) from Yarmouth in the northwest of the island and is 9 miles (14 km) west from Newport.

== History ==
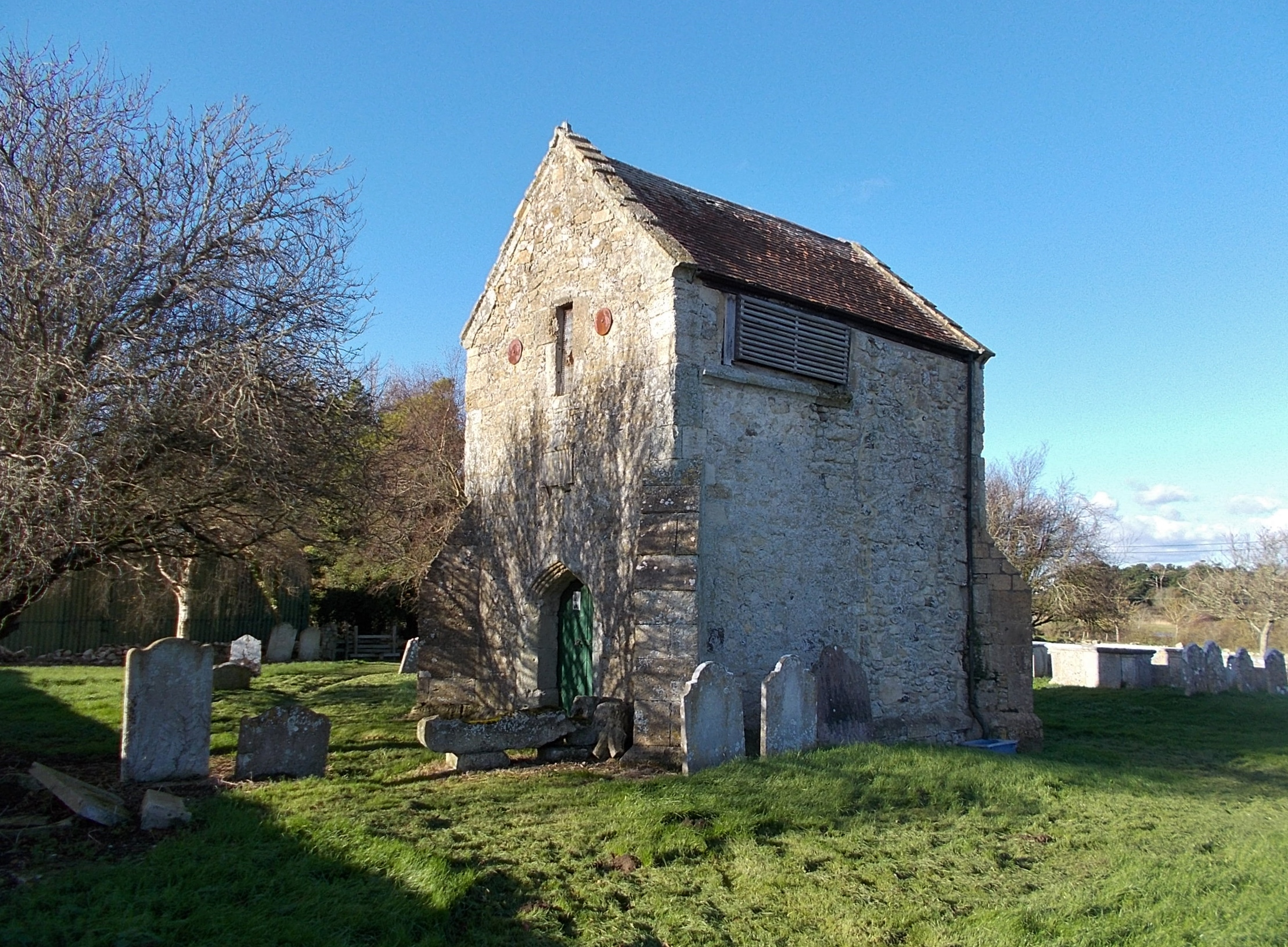
The remains of the old Church

Thorley has a manor house called Torlei (meaning thorny lea) which was held by Earl Tostig in the time of Edward the Confessor. It was originally governed by Earl Tostig during the reign of King Edward the Confessor from the manor house. Following the Norman Invasion of England, it was granted by King William the Conqueror to Richard de Redvers, (purportedly) Earl of Devon. The Earls of Devon held the land until the Isle of Wight was surrendered back to the Crown under the reign of Edward I of England. It was then granted to the Earls of Salisbury until it was confiscated by an Act of Attainder against John Montagu, 3rd Earl of Salisbury. Henry IV of England then granted it to George Plantagenet, 1st Duke of Clarence before it was returned to the Crown following an act of attainder. In 1472, King Edward IV of England gave Thorley to Anthony Woodville, 2nd Earl Rivers for six years as compensation for harm done to his family by the Duke of Clarence. Queen Elizabeth I then granted the parish out to a local farmer in exchange for annual rent, the farmer's daughter then sold it to Sir Robert Holmes, Governor of the Isle of Wight. As of 1862, Thorley was retained to follow the ownership of Yarmouth. Thorley has a cricket team. In 1931 the parish had a population of 125. On 1 April 1933 the parish was abolished and merged with Yarmouth.

== Church ==
In the 13th century a church, dedicated to St Swithun, was built in the village and it was purportedly founded by Amicia, Countess of Devon. Later on it fell into disrepair and ruin; the remaining building and small graveyard are sited adjacent to Thorley Manor, on the B3401 road to Yarmouth . In 1871 a new church was built further east, nearer the village centre, and it remains the current parish church. In 1866 a National school was opened in the village for 60 pupils. In 1912 the parish was recorded to comprise 1,580 acres (640 ha) of land.
