= Council of Winchester (1070) =

Ecclesiastical council held in England

The Council of Winchester was a church council convened in April 1070 by William the Conqueror and three papal legates: Ermenfrid, Bishop of Sion, Cardinal John Minutus, and Peter. It deposed Stigand, Archbishop of Canterbury, and several other native English bishops and abbots and left their offices free to be filled by William's largely Norman appointees, thereby transforming the highest levels of the English Church. It also promulgated a large number of measures relating to ecclesiastical practice in England, of which some parallel aspects of the Gregorian Reforms advocated by the Papacy in the late 11th century.

== Background ==
When Duke William of Normandy, known in English history as William the Conqueror, successfully invaded England in 1066, he did so with support from the Papacy which he had probably gained, in part, by the argument that the English Church stood in dire need of reform from without. Both William and the Pope, Alexander II, wished to clear up irregularities in the effective administration of the Church, though they differed as to the authority that the Pope was entitled to exercise over secular rulers, William wishing to retain in England the same independence in such matters that he already enjoyed in Normandy. During the years 1068 to 1070 William was much occupied in establishing his rule over England against the opposition of many of his Anglo-Saxon subjects, culminating in an abortive uprising in Yorkshire and the consequent Harrying of the North, and an attempted invasion by king Sweyn Estrithson of Denmark. Some of his opponents were bishops, whom even he could not deprive of their offices so easily as laymen.

One especially thorny problem was the position of the Archbishop of Canterbury, Stigand, whose legitimacy in that office was for several reasons doubtful and who before the Conquest had in secular affairs been a supporter of the House of Godwin. In early 1070 the Pope, apparently at William's invitation, sent three legates to England: Ermenfrid, Bishop of Sion; Cardinal John Minutus, priest of Santa Maria in Trastevere; and Peter, probably also a cardinal and priest of San Crisogono. Once in England they issued summonses – of which the text of one, to Bishop Wulfstan of Worcester, survives – to appear at a church council in Winchester. Wulfstan's summons was issued in the names of Peter and John only, which raises the possibility that Ermenfrid's position was subordinate to them.

== Sources ==
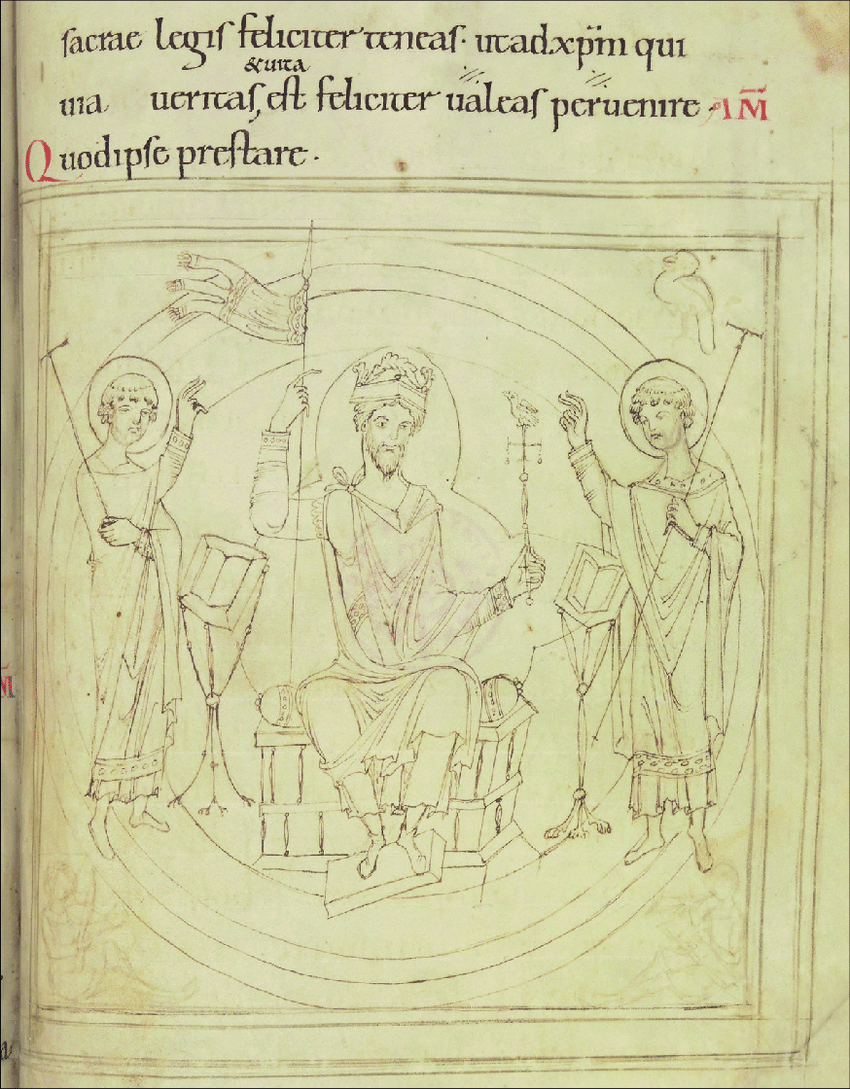
Drawing from a late 11th-century manuscript, the Ramsey Benedictional (Paris, Bibliothèque nationale de France, ms. Latin 987, f. 111r), showing William the Conqueror's second coronation in the Old Minster, Winchester on 4 April 1070

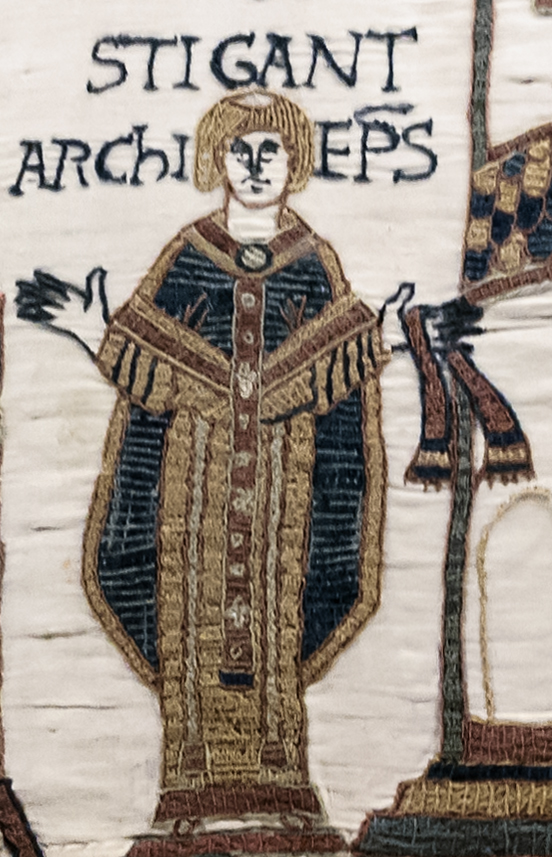
Stigand, Archbishop of Canterbury, depicted on the Bayeux Tapestry

No full report of the proceedings at Winchester has survived, though we do have a set of capitula or headings relating to the canons of a church council which can probably be identified with this one. Some account of it can also be found in Milo Crispin's Vita Lanfranci, a letter from Lanfranc to Alexander II, the profession of Remigius de Fécamp to Lanfranc, the Worcester Chronicle, and the chronicles of John of Worcester, William of Malmesbury (the Gesta Pontificum Anglorum) and Orderic Vitalis.

== Coronation ==
On 4 April, Easter Day, William was crowned for the second time at Winchester's Old Minster (his first coronation having been at Westminster Abbey on Christmas Day 1066) with the papal legates officiating. There is no mention of any swearing of oaths by or to the king, and William's legitimacy continued to rest on his first coronation, the ceremony's purpose being not to establish but to reaffirm his authority and his status as a favoured son of the Church.

== Council ==
On 7 or 11 April 1070 the council itself was convened under the presidency of the king alone, according to the Vita Lanfranci, or of the king in association with the legates, according to Orderic. William's intention, John of Worcester tells us, was to "appoint men of his own race [to] strengthen his position in the newly acquired kingdom", and in order to achieve this he "stripped of their offices many bishops and abbots who had not been condemned for any obvious reason, whether of conciliar or secular law".

The most prominent of the council's victims was Archbishop Stigand. He had remained in office up to this point in William's reign partly, it may be, because of his great wealth and influence, and partly because he was of an advanced age and could hardly live forever. However, the Pope was implacably opposed to him, excommunicating him and referring to him in a letter to William as "a source of evil". At Winchester he faced charges of having originally gained Canterbury uncanonically when the previous archbishop, Robert of Jumièges, fled the country without abdicating or being deposed; of having then been confirmed in office not by a legitimate pope but by an antipope, Benedict X; and of having held both Canterbury and the bishopric of Winchester in plurality, contrary to the canons of the Church. His deposition by the council can have surprised few observers, and he spent the short remainder of his life imprisoned in Winchester, dying in February 1072.

Other bishops were likewise purged, either at Winchester or at a further council held at Windsor just a few weeks later at Whitsun. Stigand's brother Æthelmær, Bishop of Elmham, was deposed, perhaps for being married; Leofwine, Bishop of Lichfield, who was guilty of the same offence and who had ignored his summons to the council, was excommunicated preparatory to deposition; Æthelric, Bishop of Selsey, was found guilty of unknown offences, deposed and imprisoned; and Æthelwine, Bishop of Durham, who had fled to the Scottish court on the collapse of the 1069 Northern rebellion, was outlawed. Only three native English bishops were left in office. According to John of Worcester many abbots were also deposed at Winchester, and Marc Morris believes that the abbots of Abingdon, St Albans and St Augustine's, Canterbury were among them. They may also have made the first moves towards transferring the see of Dorchester on Thames to Lincoln.

The gist of further provisions of the council can be gleaned from their surviving capitula, assuming these to relate to Winchester in 1070. So for example, the Mass was not to be celebrated with ale or water rather than with wine, nor with brass chalices, altars were only to be made of stone, baptisms were to take place only at Easter or Whitsun except in case of emergency, and ordinations only on Ember days, clergy were not to marry or live with concubines, and were not to buy their ordinations. Further, no bishop was to hold more than one see, penances for crimes were to be decided by bishops only, runaway monks were to be excommunicated and not admitted into the secular priesthood or the army, sees held in plurality were forbidden, annual diocesan synods were to be held, archdeacons appointed, and tithes paid. The overall policy observable here is the one followed in English church legislation for the next seventy years: to enforce celibacy, fight simony, and so far as possible remove churchmen from secular affairs.

== Outcome ==
Unsurprisingly, when William came to appoint replacements for the purged Anglo-Saxon bishops he mainly chose Normans, for the most part chaplains in the chapel royal or churchmen otherwise well known to him. Lanfranc, Abbot of St Stephen's, Caen, was raised to the archbishopric of Canterbury, and Walchelin, a canon of Rouen, to Winchester. One exceptional case was the bishopric of Durham, to which William appointed a Lotharingian, Walcher. Of the papal legates, John and Peter crossed to Normandy at Whitsun, where John remained. Ermenfrid presided over the Council of Windsor at Whitsun, then followed his brother-legates to Normandy where he helped to persuade Lanfranc to accept his archbishopric.
