= Saint Swithin's Day (disambiguation) =

Saint Swithin's Day is the feast day of Saint Swithun (15 July).

Saint Swithin's Day may also refer to:

- St. Swithin's Day (comics), a 1989 story
- "St Swithin's Day", a song by Billy Bragg from the 1984 album Brewing Up with Billy Bragg
  - covered by Dubstar, from the 1995 album Disgraceful
