= Saint Swithun in popular culture =

Saint Swithun has appeared many times in popular culture.

- Frank Sinatra provided advice to "reluctant pop star" George Michael and referenced St. Swithin's Day in his letter.
- The 1981 song "Night of the Vampire" by Roky Erickson references the titular vampire as having been born on St. Swithin's Day.
- The last thing that Jane Austen wrote was a poem about the Winchester races, which features Saint Swithin as the antagonist of the race attendees. She has the saint say, "Oh, subjects rebellious, Oh Venta depraved/ When once we are buried you think we are dead/ But behold me Immortal. --By vice you're enslaved/ You have sinn'd & must suffer...Ye cannot but know my command o'er July,/ Henceforward I'll triumph in shewing my powers,/ Shift your race as you will it shall never be dry/ The curse upon Venta is July in showers." Jane Austen died three days after writing this poem, and was shortly thereafter buried in St. Swithin's Cathedral, Winchester.
- "St Swithin's Day", a song by Billy Bragg from the 1984 album Brewing Up with Billy Bragg
- In The Sopranos episode House Arrest, Junior Soprano asks Bobby in reference to him getting his garbage disposal fixed, "When? St. Swithun's Day?"
- Bart refers to "St Swithin's Day" in a play he wrote in "Bart of Darkness," Season 6, Episode 1 of The Simpsons.
- "St. Swithun's" is the Wayne Foundation-funded orphanage that raised the orphan patrolman John Blake in The Dark Knight Rises. The naming of an orphanage after St. Swithun is a reference to his restoring "broken eggs" in regards to "broken children".
- In David Nicholls novel One Day, each chapter covers the lives of two protagonists on St Swithin's Day every year over a twenty year period.
- The Barony of St. Swithin's Bog, a chapter of the Society for Creative Anachronism based in Johnstown, PA, was named after the saint.
- The 1969 television comedy “Doctor in the House “ takes place at the fictional St. Swithin’s Hospital.
