= St Swithun's Church, Worcester =

Coordinates: 52.1926°N 2.2202°W

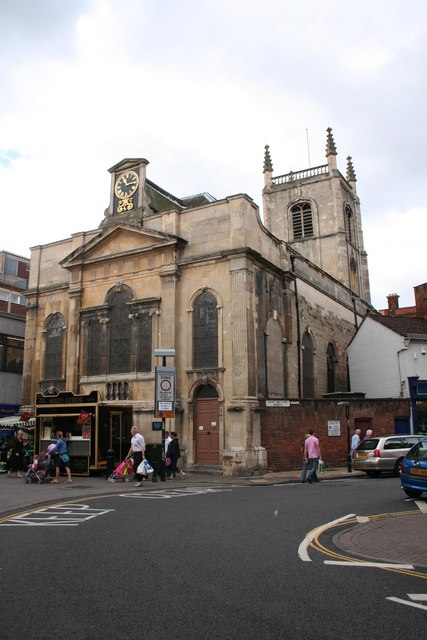
- St Swithun's Church, Worcester, from the northeast

- Location in Worcestershire
- Location: Worcester, Worcestershire
- Country: England
- Denomination: Anglican
- Website: Churches Conservation Trust

History
- Dedication: Saint Swithun

Architecture
- Functional status: Redundant
- Heritage designation: Grade I
- Designated: 22 May 1954
- Architect(s): Thomas and Edward Woodward
- Architectural type: Church
- Style: Georgian with Gothic features
- Groundbreaking: 1126
- Completed: 1736

Specifications
- Materials: Oolitic limestone

St Swithun's Church is a redundant Anglican church in the city of Worcester, Worcestershire, England (grid reference SO850549). It is recorded in the National Heritage List for England as a designated Grade I listed building, and is under the care of the Churches Conservation Trust. The church is considered to be "one of the best preserved examples of an early Georgian church in England". The architectural historian Alec Clifton-Taylor included the church in his list of 'best' English parish churches.

== History ==
The earliest documentary evidence of the church is in 1126 when Eudo, Dean of Worcester, gave permission for the nearby Benedictine priory to build a church on his land. The resulting church was dedicated to Saint Swithun. The tower of the present church dates from the 15th century, but between 1734 and 1736 the rest of the church was rebuilt and the tower was refaced. The architects were Thomas and Edward Woodward of Chipping Campden. In the middle of the 19th century the east window was redesigned by Henry Eginton to accommodate new stained glass. In 1977 the church was declared redundant and was vested in the Churches Conservation Trust. The church is now used as a venue for special services, ceremonies and concerts. A group has been formed, known as the Friends of St Swithun's, to help in the upkeep of the building and to encourage its use by the local community.

== Architecture ==
=== Exterior ===
While the former church was constructed in sandstone, the present church is built in oolitic limestone. Its classicising style is admixed with some Gothic Revival features. The plan consists of a six-bay rectangle with a west tower. The tower is in four stages, which are separated by string courses, and it has diagonal buttresses. At the west end is a doorway over which is a lintel, and a fanlight whose architrave contains Perpendicular tracery and whose keystone is carved with the head of a putto. Each of the upper stages contains two-light windows with mullions. Those in the second stage have leaded lights, those in the third stage are blind, and the top stage has louvred bell openings. At the summit of the tower is a balustrade and there are crocketted pinnacles at the corners. Each bay along the sides of the church contains a round-headed window, and between the bays there are Doric pilasters. The east end is in three bays, with the central bay projecting forwards. The bays are again separated by Doric pilasters. The central bay contains a Venetian window with Ionic pilasters. Above this window is a pediment, and over this is a clock. The outer bays each contain doorways and windows, both of which are round-headed.

=== Interior ===
The interior consists of a single cell with no division between the nave and the chancel. The roof is rib vaulted, and is decorated with roundels containing Gothic motifs and the heads of putti. The chancel contains a screen supported by four Doric columns. At the west end is a canted gallery supported by square fluted wooden pillars. Behind it sits the organ. All the windows contain leaded lights, other than the east window which has late 19th-century stained glass by Henry Eginton. The altar is made from wrought iron. On the right side of the nave is a three-decker wooden pulpit, which is reached by a spiral staircase. Above the pulpit is an elaborately carved tester with a crown supporting a pelican feeding her young. In front of the pulpit is a pew containing the elaborate mayor's chair and a sword rest, and throughout the rest of the church there are panelled box pews. The font is in a box pew to the right of the west entrance. It consists of a white marble bowl on a stem, with a mahogany cover. Around the church are a number of monuments, the oldest dating from 1627. The organ originally dates from 1736, but it has been modified since to create the current two-manual organ. The first modifications were made in about 1760, then more were carried out in 1795 by William and Robert Gray, in 1844 by John Nicholson, and in 1955, also thought to be by Nicholson. In 2008, because of its historical importance, it was awarded a Grade I Certificate by the British Institute of Organ Studies and underwent a full restoration by Goetze and Gwynn in 2009–10. There is a ring of six bells. Three of these were cast locally in about 1420. The other three were cast by John Martin in 1654. There is another bell that is unused; it was cast by Abraham Rudhall II in 1720.

== See also ==
- List of churches preserved by the Churches Conservation Trust in the English Midlands
