= Old Minster, Winchester =

Former Anglo-Saxon cathedral for the diocese of Wessex

The Old Minster was the Anglo-Saxon cathedral for the English diocese of Wessex and then Winchester from 660 to 1093. It stood on a site immediately north of and partially beneath its successor, Winchester Cathedral.

Some sources say that the minster was constructed in 648 for King Cenwalh of Wessex as the church of St Peter and St Paul, though such sources are late and unreliable. More likely it was built c. 660 to be the cathedral for the first bishop of Winchester, the Saxon Bishop Wine, when the West Saxon bishopric was transferred from Dorchester-on-Thames. It was enlarged and redecorated over the years and Saint Swithun was buried outside it in 862. By the 10th century, the Minster was the priory church of St. Swithun's Priory, a community of monks living under the rule of St Benedict.

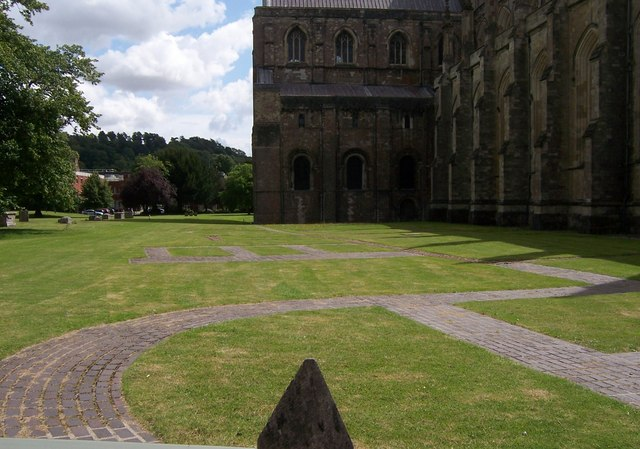
Modern tiles outline the site of the minster next to Winchester Cathedral

In 901, the New Minster was built next to it, so close that the singing of the monks inside each is said to have become hopelessly intermingled with the other. Saint Æthelwold of Winchester and his successor Saint Alphege almost completely rebuilt the minster on a vast scale during their monastic reforms of the 970s. The new church, which was dedicated in 980 and again in 993, had a central tower, north and south aisles, a crypt in an eastern apse, and a forecourt at the west. Saint Swithun's body was taken into an indoor shrine in what had become the largest church in Europe. However, after the Norman conquest of England, Bishop Walkelin built a new cathedral alongside and the Old Minster was demolished in 1093. Many of the kings of Wessex and of England (including Egbert, king of Wessex from 802 until his death in 839), as well bishops, had been buried in the Old Minster, so their bodies were exhumed and re-interred in the new building.

The Old Minster was excavated in the 1960s. The outline of the building is now laid out in brickwork in the churchyard adjoining Winchester Cathedral, and Saint Swithun's first grave is clearly marked. Finds from the site may be seen in the Winchester City Museum. The bones of the monarchs removed to the cathedral are housed in mortuary chests around the choir.

== Notable events ==
- Signing of the Regularis Concordia by King Edgar the Peaceable (973)
- Coronation of Edward the Confessor (1043)
- Marriage of Edward the Confessor and Edith (1045)
- Coronation of Matilda of Flanders as queen consort (1068)

== Burials ==
- Æthelstan Ætheling
- Ælfgifu (wife of Eadwig)
- Cnut the Great, King of England, Denmark, and Norway
- Harthacnut, King of England and Denmark
- Emma of Normandy, wife of Æthelred the Unready and Cnut the Great, Queen Consort of England, Denmark, and Norway
- Godwin, Earl of Wessex (died 1053)
