= Swithun =

Bishop of Winchester (died 863)

Saint Swithun
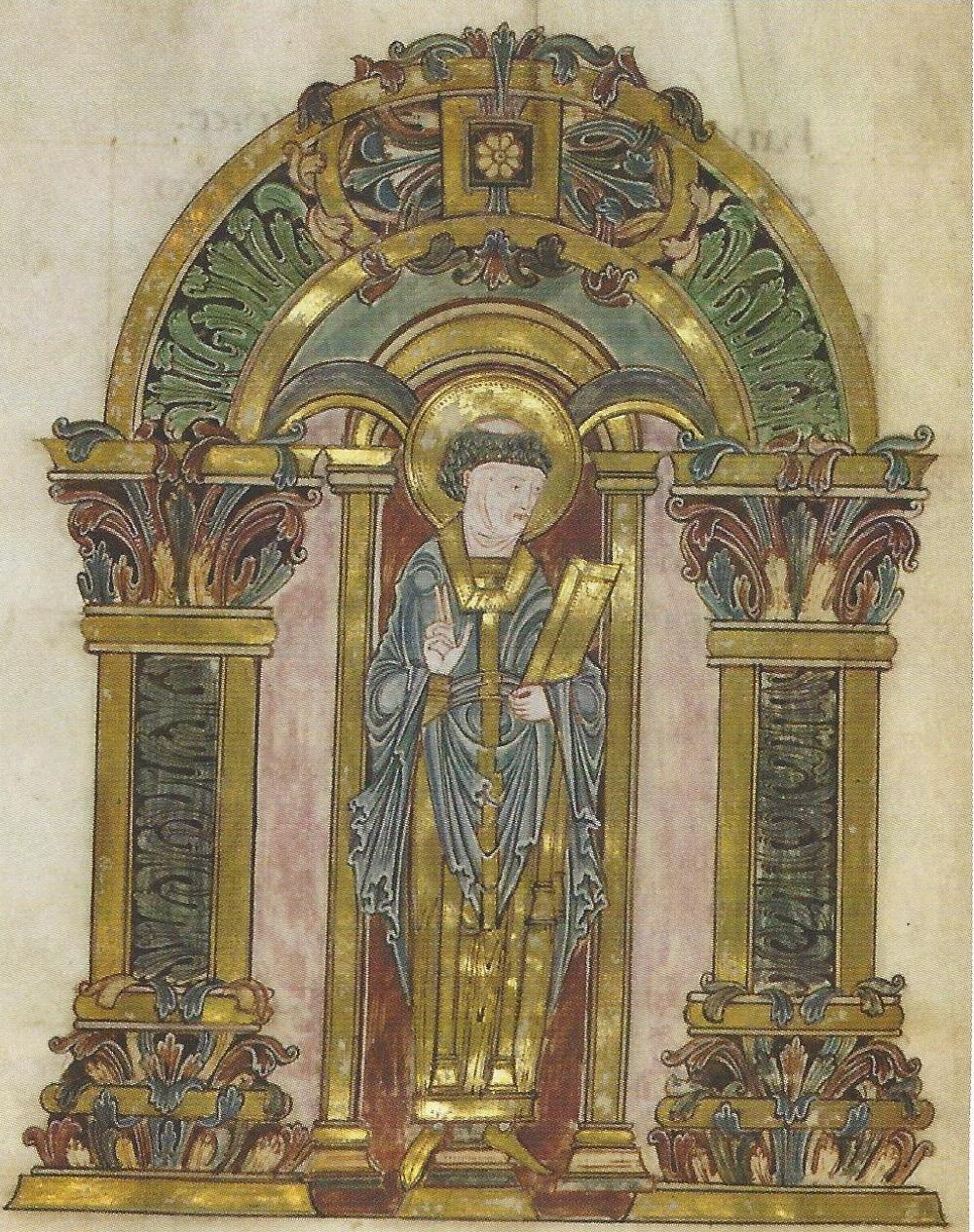
- Portrait of St Swithun in the Benedictional of St Æthelwold, c. 970s

Bishop of Winchester Confessor
- Died: 2 July 863; Winchester, Hampshire
- Venerated in: Catholic Church; Anglican Communion; Eastern Orthodox Church
- Major shrine: Winchester Cathedral. Parts survive in cathedral museum. Also modern replacement shrine.
- Feast: 2 July (Norway); 15 July (England)
- Attributes: Bishop, holding a bridge, broken eggs at his feet
- Patronage: Hampshire; Winchester; Southwark; the weather

Swithun (or Swithin; Old English: Swīþhūn; Latin: Swithunus; died 2 July 863) was an Anglo-Saxon bishop of Winchester and subsequently patron saint of Winchester Cathedral. His historical importance as bishop is overshadowed by his reputation for posthumous miracle-working.

== Biography ==
Swithun was Bishop of Winchester from his consecration on 30 October 852 until his death on 2 July 863. However, he is scarcely mentioned in any document of his own time. His death is entered in the Canterbury manuscript of the Anglo-Saxon Chronicle (MS F) under the year 861. He is recorded as a witness to nine charters, the earliest of which (S 308) is dated 854.

More than a hundred years later, when Dunstan and Æthelwold of Winchester were inaugurating their church reform, Swithun was adopted as patron of the restored church at Winchester, formerly dedicated to St Peter and St Paul. His body was transferred from its almost forgotten grave to Æthelwold's new basilica on 15 July 971; according to contemporary writers, numerous miracles preceded and followed the move.

== In legend ==
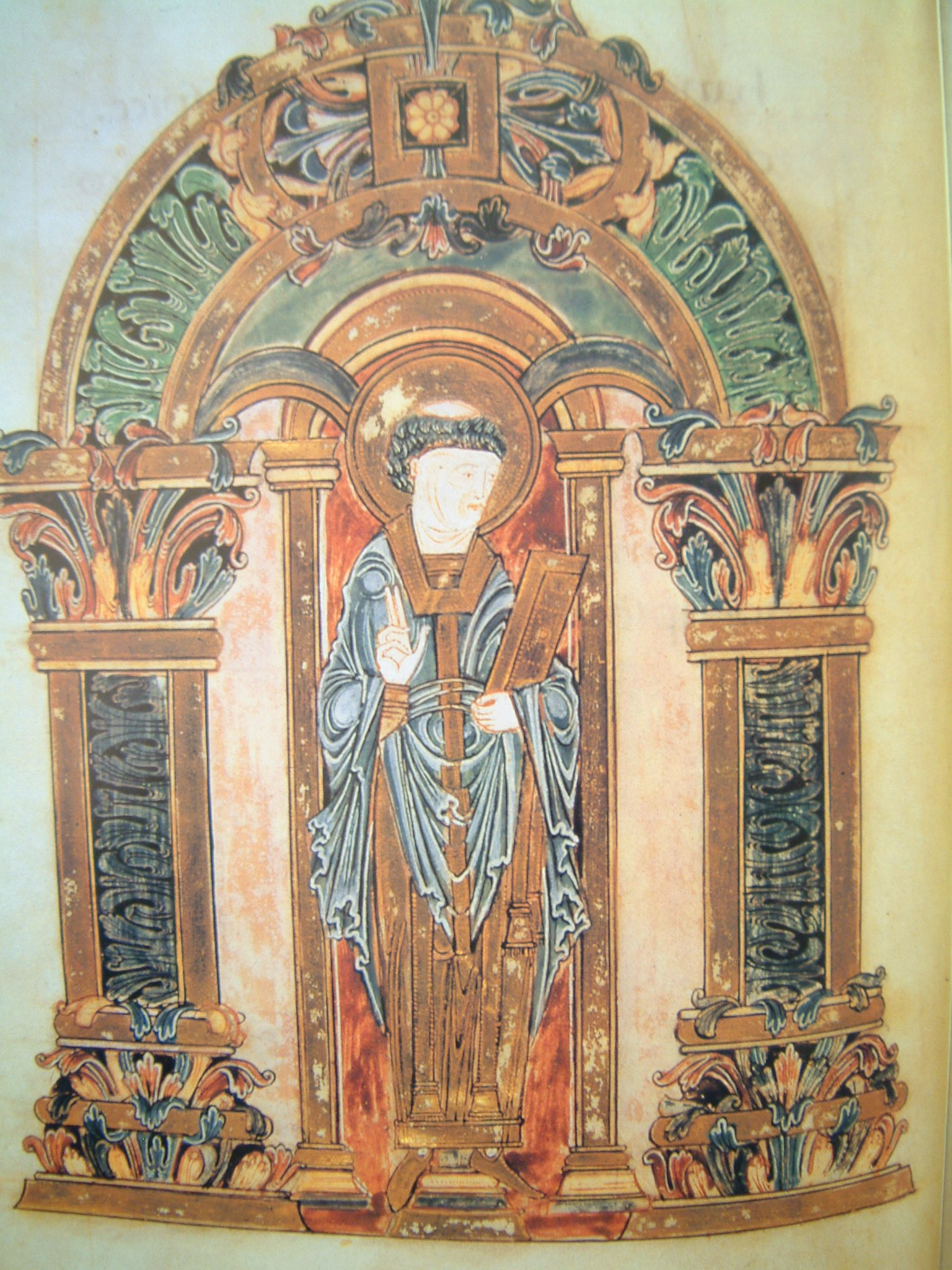
Swithun shown in the Benedictional of St Æthelwold, Winchester, 10th century. British Library, London

The revival of Swithun's fame gave rise to a mass of legendary literature. The so-called Vita S. Swithuni of Lantfred and Wulfstan, written about 1000, hardly contains any biographical fact; all that has in later years passed for authentic detail of Swithun's life is extracted from a late eleventh-century hagiography ascribed to Goscelin of St Bertin's, a monk who came over to England with Hermann, bishop of Salisbury from 1058 to 1078. According to this writer Saint Swithun was born in the reign of Egbert of Wessex, and was ordained priest by Helmstan, bishop of Winchester (838-c. 852). His fame reached the king's ears, and he appointed him tutor of his son, Æthelwulf (alias Adulphus), and considered him one of his chief friends. However, Michael Lapidge describes the work as "pure fiction" and shows that the attribution to Goscelin is false.

Under Æthelwulf, Swithun was appointed bishop of Winchester, to which see he was consecrated by Archbishop Ceolnoth. In his new office he was known for his piety and his zeal in building new churches or restoring old ones. At his request Æthelwulf gave the tenth of his royal lands to the Church. Swithun made his diocesan journeys on foot; when he gave a banquet he invited the poor and not the rich. William of Malmesbury adds that, if Bishop Ealhstan of Sherborne was Æthelwulf's minister for temporal matters, Swithun was the minister for spiritual matters.

Swithun's best-known miracle was his restoration on a bridge of a basket of eggs that workmen had maliciously broken. Of stories connected with Swithun the two most famous are those of the Winchester egg-woman and Queen Emma's ordeal. The former is to be found in the hagiography attributed to Goscelin, the latter in Thomas Rudborne's Historia major (15th century), a work which is also responsible for the story that Swithun accompanied Alfred on his visit to Rome in the 850s. He died on 2 July 862. On his deathbed Swithun begged that he should be buried outside the north wall of his cathedral where passers-by should pass over his grave and raindrops from the eaves drop upon it.

== Veneration ==
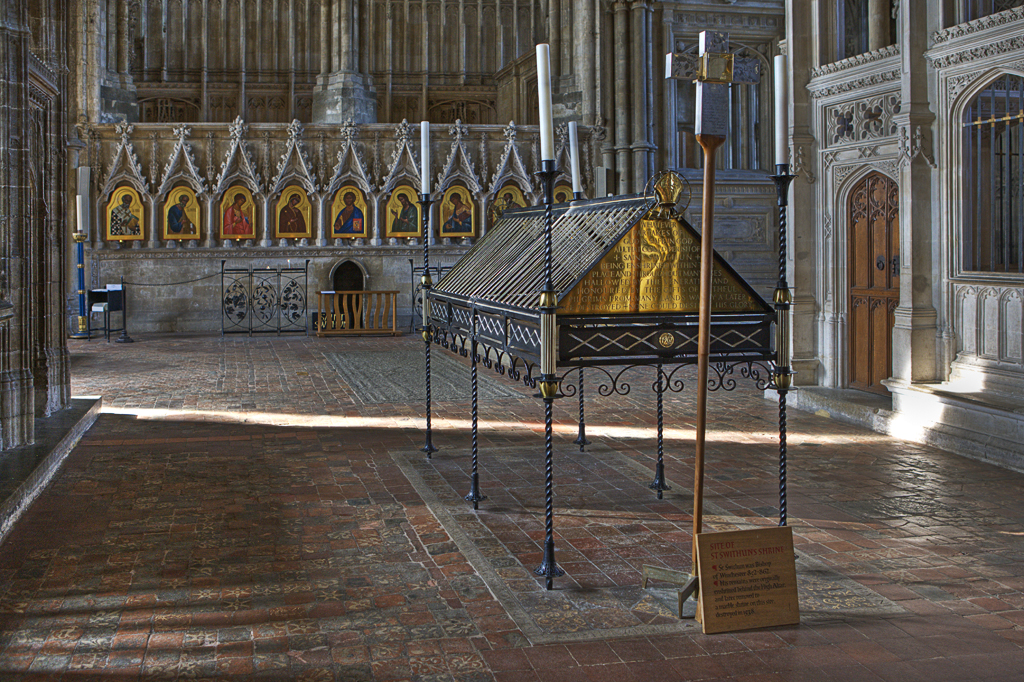
St Swithun's memorial shrine in the retrochoir of Winchester Cathedral in Hampshire, where the saint's relics were originally kept

Swithun's feast day in England is on 15 July and in Norway (and formerly in medieval Wales) on 2 July. He is also listed on 2 July in the Roman Martyrology. He was moved from his grave to an indoor shrine in the Old Minster at Winchester in 971. His body was probably later split between a number of smaller shrines. His head was certainly detached and, in the Middle Ages, taken to Canterbury Cathedral. Peterborough Abbey had an arm. His main shrine was transferred into the new Norman cathedral at Winchester in 1093. He was installed on a 'feretory platform' above and behind the high altar. The retrochoir was built in the early 13th century to accommodate the huge numbers of pilgrims wishing to visit his shrine and enter the 'holy hole' beneath him. His empty tomb in the ruins of the Old Minster was also popular with visitors. The shrine was only moved into the retrochoir itself in 1476. It was demolished in 1538 during the English Reformation. A modern representation of it now stands on the site.

The shrine of Swithun at Winchester was supposedly a site of numerous miracles in the Middle Ages. Æthelwold of Winchester ordered that all monks were to stop whatever they were doing and head to the church to praise God every time that a miracle happened. A story exists that the monks at some point got so fed up with this, because they sometimes had to wake up and go to the church three or four times each night, that they decided to stop going. St Swithun then appeared in a dream to someone (possibly two people) and warned them that if they stopped going to the church, then miracles would cease. This person (or persons) then warned the monks about the dream they had, and the monks then caved in and decided to go to the church each time a miracle happened again.

Swithun is remembered in the Church of England with a Lesser Festival on 15 July.

== Patronage ==
Swithun is regarded as one of the saints to whom one should pray in the event of drought.

== Legacy ==
There are in excess of forty churches dedicated to St Swithun, which can be found throughout the south of England, especially in Hampshire – see this list. An example is St Swithun's, Headbourne Worthy, to the north of Winchester. This church is surrounded on three sides by a brook that flows from a spring in the village; the lych gate on the south side is also a bridge over the brook, which is unusual. Other churches dedicated to St Swithun can be found at Walcot, Lincoln, Worcester, Cheswardine, Shropshire and western Norway, where Stavanger Cathedral is dedicated to him. He is also commemorated at St Swithin's Lane in the City of London (site of the former church of St Swithin, London Stone, demolished after wartime damage in 1962), St Swithun's School for girls in Winchester and St Swithun's quadrangle in Magdalen College, Oxford. In Stavanger, Norway, several schools and institutions are named "St. Svithun" after him.

== Proverb ==
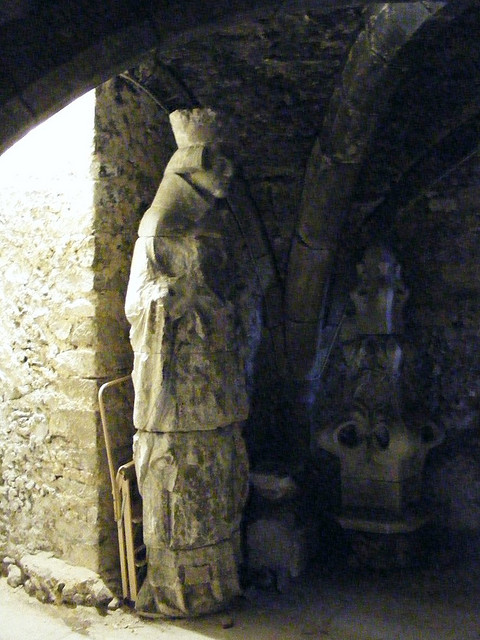
Statue of St Swithun originally on the façade of Winchester Cathedral; now housed in the crypt

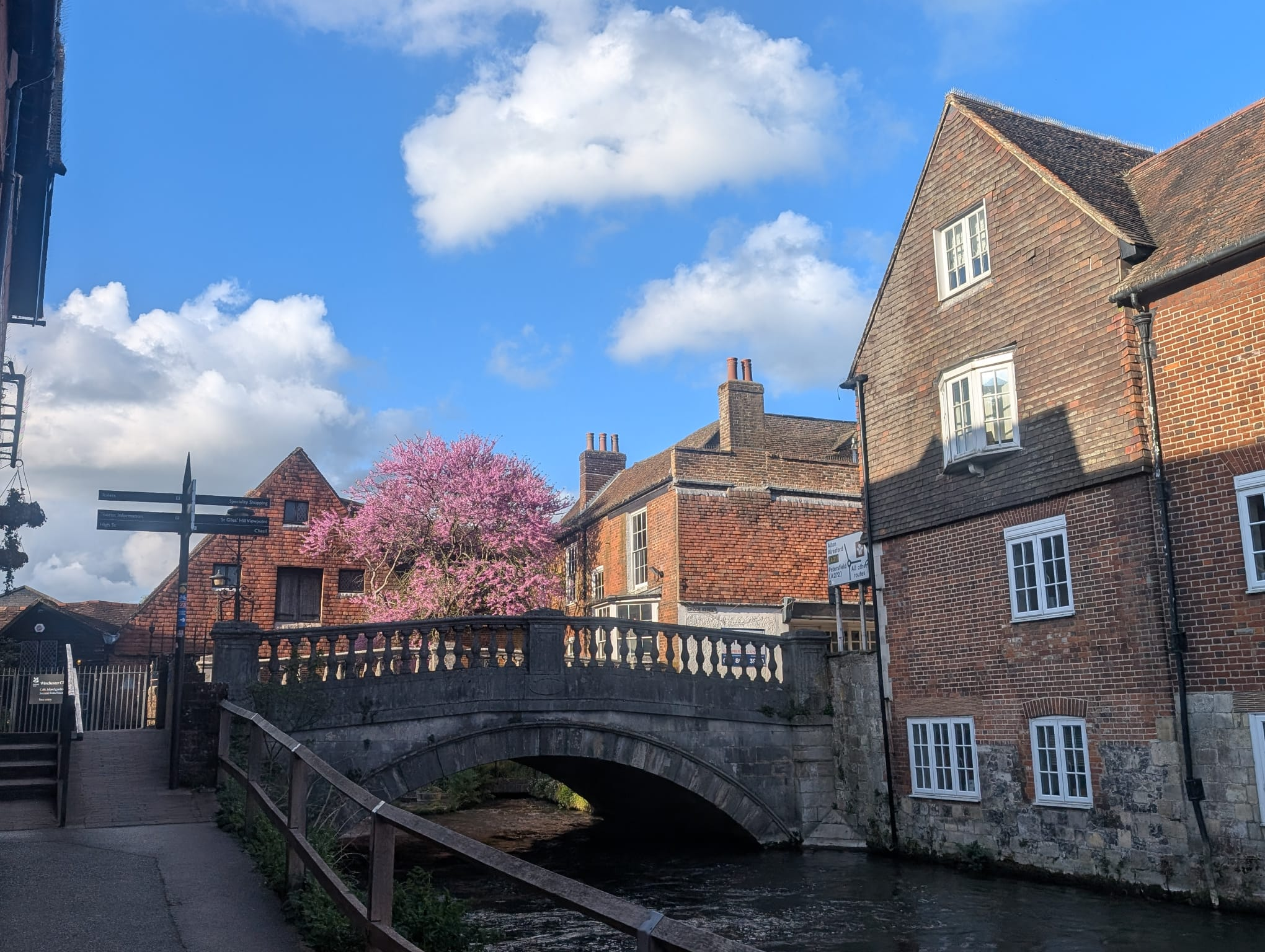
The proverb is sometimes attributed specifically to City Bridge in Winchester, also known as Swithun's Bridge or Soke Bridge

The name of Swithun is best known today for a British weather lore proverb, which says that if it rains on St Swithun's day, 15 July, it will rain for forty days.

St Swithun's day if thou dost rain
For forty days it will remain
St Swithun's day if thou be fair
For forty days 'twill rain nae mare

A Buckinghamshire variation has:

If on St Swithun's day it really pours
You're better off to stay indoors

Swithun was initially buried outdoors, rather than in his cathedral, apparently at his own request. William of Malmesbury recorded that the bishop left instructions that his body should be buried outside the church, ubi et pedibus praetereuntium et stillicidiis ex alto rorantibus esset obnoxius [where it might be subject to the feet of passers-by and to the raindrops pouring from on high], which has been taken as indicating that the legend was already well known in the 12th century.

In 971 it was decided to move his body to a new indoor shrine, and one theory traces the origin of the legend to a heavy shower by which, on the day of the move, the saint marked his displeasure towards those who were removing his remains. This story, however, cannot be traced further back than the 17th or 18th century. Also, it is at variance with the 10th century writers, who all agreed that the move took place in accordance with the saint's desire expressed in a vision. James Raine suggested that the legend was derived from the tremendous downpour of rain that occurred, according to the Durham chroniclers, on St.Swithun's Day, 1315.

John Earle suggests that the legend comes from a pagan or possibly prehistoric day of augury. In France, St Medard (8 June), Urban of Langres, and St Gervase and St Protais (19 June) are credited with an influence on the weather almost identical with that attributed to St Swithun in England. In Flanders, there is St Godelieve (6 July) and in Germany the Seven Sleepers' Day (27 June). In Russia it is the day of Sampson the Hospitable (27 June old style).

There is a scientific basis to the weather pattern behind the legend of St Swithun's day. Around the middle of July, the jet stream settles into a pattern which, in the majority of years, holds reasonably steady until the end of August. When the jet stream lies north of the British Isles then continental high pressure is able to move in; when it lies across or south of the British Isles, Arctic air and Atlantic weather systems predominate. The most false that the prediction has been, according to the Guinness Book of Records, was in 1924 when 13.5 hours of sunshine in London were followed by 30 of the next 40 days being wet, and in 1913 when a 15-hour rainstorm was followed by 30 dry days out of 40.

== See also ==
- Saint Swithun in popular culture

Christian titles
| Preceded by Helmstan | Bishop of Winchester; 852–862 | Succeeded by Ealhferth |
