= Baldock (surname) =

Baldock is a surname. Notable people with the surname include:

- Alex Baldock (born 1970), British businessman
- Bob Baldock (1937–2022), American artist
- Bobby Baldock (born 1936), United States federal judge
- Cora Baldock (born 1935), Australian-Dutch sociologist
- Darrel Baldock (1938–2011), Australian footballer
- Edward Holmes Baldock (1812–1875), MP for Shrewsbury 1847–1857
- George Baldock (1993–2024), Greek footballer
- Jeremiah Wallace Baldock (1842–1919), American politician
- John Baldock (1915–2003), British politician
- Larry Baldock (born 1954), New Zealand politician
- Ralph Baldock (died 1313), Bishop of London from 1304
- Robert Baldock, (died 1327) Lord Privy Seal and Lord Chancellor of England 1320–1326
- Robert Baldock (judge) (1624/5–1691), English judge
- Sam Baldock (born 1989), English football player
- Sarah Baldock (born 1975), English organist and choral conductor
- Teddy Baldock (1907–1971), English boxer
- William Baldock (cricketer, born 1815) (1815–1878), Gentlemen of Kent cricketer
- William Baldock (Hampshire cricketer) (1847–1923), his son
- William Baldock (Somerset cricketer) (1900–1941), his son

== See also ==
- Baldock's Mill, heritage site in Bourne, Lincolnshire
- Baldoc (disambiguation)
