= William Baldock =

William Baldock may refer to:

- William Baldock (cricketer, born 1815) (1815–1878), Gentlemen of Kent cricketer
- William Baldock (Hampshire cricketer) (1847–1923), his son
- William Baldock (Somerset cricketer) (1900–1941), his son
