= Henry de Cliff =

English judge

Henry de Cliff (died 1334), was an English judge.

== First mentioned ==
De Cliff is first mentioned as accompanying the king abroad in May 1313; and on 11 May 1317, as a master in chancery, he had charge of the Great Seal at the house of the Lord Chancellor, John Sandale, Bishop of Winchester.

== Possible confusion and further career ==
There is another master in chancery in Edward II's reign of the same name, probably a brother. From 1317 till 1324 de Cliff continued to be one of the clerks under whose seal, during the absences of the Lords Chancellors Sandale, Hotham, Bishop of Ely, Salmon, Bishop of Norwich, and Baldock, the great seal was constantly secured. On the opening of parliament on 6 October 1320 he was auditor of petitions in England and Wales. On 23 February 1324 he appears as a canon of York and as procurator in parliament at Westminster, both for the dean and chapter of York and for the bishop of St Asaph.

== As Master of the Rolls ==
On 4 July 1325 he was appointed Master of the Rolls, and after the abdication of Edward II in 1326 he was, on 17 December, directed to add his seal to that of the Bishop of Norwich to secure the great seal. Until the appointment of Bishop Hotham of Ely as lord chancellor on the accession of Edward III, the Bishop of Norwich and Cliff discharged the chancellor's duties. For some dispute with Thomas de Cherleton, Bishop of Hereford, in connection with the presentation to the prebend of Blebury in Salisbury Cathedral he incurred the penalty of excommunication, in regard to which, within a month of his accession, and again in the following March, Edward III personally wrote letters on his behalf. The great seal continued to be often entrusted to him. From the resignation of John de Hotham to the appointment of Henry Burghersh, Bishop of Lincoln (1 March to 12 May 1328), he held it along with William de Herlaston, and during absences of Burghersh it was in his custody again in 1328 (1–30 July and 17–26 August), and in 1329 (31 May – 11 June). He was similarly entrusted with it under the next chancellor, John de Stratford, bishop of Winchester, in April and November 1331, and April and December 1332. In 1329 he was a commissioner with the Bishop of Hereford and another to open the adjourned session of parliament.

== Death ==
He died in January 1334, and on the 20th was succeeded by Michael de Wath.
