= Richard de Ayreminne =

Chancellor of the dioceses of Norwich and Salisbury

Richard de Ayreminne, or Ayermin (died 1340?), was the chancellor of the dioceses of Norwich and Salisbury.

Ayreminne was a younger brother of William de Ayreminne, bishop of Norwich. He was probably in early life a clerk of the exchequer. On 26 May 1324, he was made keeper of the rolls in the place of his brother William. Between 16 November and 12 December of the same year, he kept the great seal during the absence of the chancellor, Robert de Baldock, in Scotland. On 4 July 1325, Henry Cliff was substituted for Richard de Ayreminne in the keepership of the rolls, probably in consequence of the quarrel of his brother William with Edward II as to his right to the see of Norwich. In September 1325, Richard was appointed rector of Elveley (Alveley, co. Salop), and made by his brother chancellor of his diocese of Norwich. But shortly afterwards he, with another brother, Adam, left for France to join his brother William.

In 1326, Edward II issued a writ complaining of the refusal of the brothers to appear before him, and directing the Archbishop of York to secure their attendance. After Edward III's accession in 1327, Richard was made clerk of the privy seal, and subsequently guardian of the Jewish converts for life. On 7 June 1339, he resigned this post. He was appointed chancellor of the diocese of Salisbury on 16 July 1339; and since a successor to him was nominated in 1340, that year has been assumed to be the date of his death.
