= Robert Orford (bishop) =

14th-century Bishop of Ely

- Bishop of Ely
- Elected: 14 April 1302
- Term ended: 21 January 1310
- Predecessor: Ralph Walpole
- Successor: John Ketton

Orders
- Consecration: 28 October 1302

Personal details
- Died: 21 January 1310
- Denomination: Catholic

Robert Orford (died 21 January 1310) was a medieval Bishop of Ely, elected on 14 April 1302 and consecrated on 28 October 1302.

On 6 April 1290, Orford was one of the monks of Ely Cathedral who brought the news of the death of Bishop John Kirkby to King Edward I. He was afterwards sub-prior of the monks and elected prior in succession to John Salmon in July 1299.

Orford was elected bishop of Ely by the monks as a compromise. Copies of the formal letters announcing his election are found in the Ramsey Cartulary. Orford is there described as "of approved learning, life, and morals, of lawful age, and in priest's orders, born in lawful matrimony." Archbishop Robert Winchelsey, however, refused to confirm Orford on the ground that he was not sufficiently learned, and on 16 July quashed the election. Orford and his monks promptly appealed to the pope, and Orford went in person to Rome. Pope Boniface VIII referred the case to three cardinals; after their examination, Orford of his own free will resigned all his rights, and was then reappointed by the pope, who directed the cardinal-bishop of Albano, Leonardo Patrasso, to consecrate him. Orford was accordingly consecrated on 28 October.

Orford, on his return to England, made his canonical profession to Archbishop Winchelsey, but declined the archbishop's proposal to enthrone him, declaring that the see was already his by apostolic authority. The temporalities of the see were restored on 4 February 1303. The relations between Orford and Winchelsey continued strained, and to the time of his death Orford refused to provide a clerk with a benefice on the archbishop's nomination in accordance with the usual custom. Orford's journey to Rome encumbered him with a debt of 15,000 pounds. While still at Rome the pope had granted him a license to contract a loan for 13,000 florins to meet his expenses. On 8 October 1306 he made a return to the pope concerning the relics preserved at Scone Abbey. Orford died at Little Downham and was buried before the great altar in the cathedral. He left the convent an embroidered alb and other vestments.

== Citations ==
Catholic Church titles
Preceded by Ralph Walpole	Bishop of Ely; 1302–1310	Succeeded by John Ketton
