= John Benstead =

John Benstead may refer to:

- John de Benstede (c. 1275–1323/4), member of the English royal household
- John Benstead (trade unionist) (1897–1979), English trade unionist
