= Stephen de Gravesend =

Stephen de Gravesend may refer to:

- Stephen Gravesend, bishop
- Stephen de Gravesend (MP) for Middlesex (UK Parliament constituency)
