= William Greenfield =

Archbishop of York from 1306 to 1315

- Archbishop of York
- Archbishop Greenfield's monument at York Minster
- Elected: 4 December 1304
- Installed: unknown
- Term ended: 6 December 1315
- Predecessor: Thomas of Corbridge
- Successor: William Melton

Orders
- Consecration: 30 January 1306

Personal details
- Died: 6 December 1315 Cawood
- Buried: York Minster

William Greenfield (died 6 December 1315) served as both the Lord Chancellor of England and the Archbishop of York. He was also known as William of Greenfield.

== Early life ==
Greenfield was born in the eponymous Lincolnshire hamlet of Greenfield. The date of his birth is now lost yet we know that he was related to a predecessor in the See, Archbishop Walter Giffard, who paid for the young Greenfield's Oxford education in the year 1269. Giffard instructed that his bailiff at Churchdown (near Gloucester), "...to pay to Roger the miller of Oxford twenty shillings, for our kinsman William of Greenfield while he is studying there, because it would be difficult for us to send the money to him on account of the perils of the ways". Greenfield next studied in Paris, where he became a doctor of both civil and canon law. Walter Giffard's brother was Godfrey Gifford, the Bishop of Worcester.

Greenfield was the first of a number of Archbishops who ruled the northern English Archiepiscopal diocese as well as being significant statesmen during the fourteenth century.

Before being made Archbishop he was variously:

- Dean of Chichester,
- Rector of Stratford-upon-Avon
- Prebend of Ripon – where his stall was for a time sequestrated, on account of his non-residence – as at this time he was mainly occupied on affairs of state as a clerk and counsellor to Edward I
- Temporal Chancellor of Durham
- Chancellor of England (1302–1305). On 30 September 1302 Greenfield received the custody of the great seal as chancellor at St. Radegund's Abbey (near Dover). During his absence in France, one Adam of Osgodby, then the Master of the Rolls, acted as his substitute.
- Employed in the service of the State by King Edward I from 1290 onwards.

== Archbishop of York ==
Greenfield was elected by the Chapter of York on 4 December 1304; however there was delay in his consecration due to the death of Pope Benedict XI; when finally consecrated it was by Clement V at Lyons, on 30 January 1306. Greenfield was strongly commended to the pope and cardinals by the King, who told them of his "...wisdom in council, industry, literary knowledge, and usefulness to the state".

Before his appointment Greenfield had lived for some time resident in Rome where the cost of his living and the procuring of the Papal assent were very heavy leaving Greenfield obliged to borrow money and to remark, "All the money lenders were ecclesiastics. The Jews had disappeared some years before and the greater part of the treasure of the country was now stored away in the chests of some wealthy clerk or in the coffers of the monastery." He was forced to raise money to pay his debts from the company of the Bellardi of Lucca. In an attempt to free himself from the Italian money lenders he exacted aids from the clergy, and borrowed from many church dignitaries in the north of England.

As a result of the ongoing war with Scotland York became almost the de facto capital of England, with Parliament being held there in 1298, 1299 and 1300. The Courts of Justice were also moved to York and did not return to London for seven years.

When the attack on the Templars in England began in 1308 Greenfield was favourable to them and so refused to take any part in actions against them within the province of Canterbury; he was however present at the Great Council of Vienne in 1312, when Pope Clement V issued an edict dissolving the Order of the Templars.

Greenfield died at his palace of Cawood on 6 December 1315, and was buried in the eastern part of the north transept of York Minster, where his monument still remains. A gold ring with a ruby was taken from his finger when in 1735 his tomb was opened; these mementoes have been preserved by the Cathedral authorities.

== Citations ==
Political offices
Preceded by John Langton	Lord Chancellor; 1302–1305	Succeeded by William Hamilton
Catholic Church titles
Preceded by Thomas of Corbridge	Archbishop of York; 1306–1315	Succeeded by See vacant for two years, then William Melton
