= Osgodby =

Osgodby may refer to:

== Places ==
- Osgodby, Lincolnshire, England
- Osgodby, South Kesteven, a hamlet in the parish of Lenton, Keisby and Osgodby, Lincolnshire
- Osgodby, coastal North Yorkshire, England
- Osgodby, Barlby with Osgodby, North Yorkshire, England
- Osgodby, Thirkleby High and Low with Osgodby, Hambleton, North Yorkshire

== People ==
- Adam Osgodby (died 1316), English lawyer and administrator
