= Thomas Barrow =

Thomas Barrow may refer to:

- Thomas Barrow (pirate) (died 1726), English pirate based in New Providence
- Thomas Barrow (Jesuit) (1747–1813), British Jesuit
- Thomas Barrow (politician) (1916–1982), politician in Manitoba, Canada
- Thomas Barrow (artist) (1938–2024), American artist
- Thomas Barrow (Downton Abbey), character on the television show Downton Abbey

== See also ==
- Thomas Barowe (died 1497), ecclesiastic and judge
