= William of March =

13th and 14th-century Bishop of Bath and Wells

- Bishop of Bath and Wells
- Elected: 30 January 1293
- Term ended: 11 June 1302
- Predecessor: Robert Burnell
- Successor: Walter Haselshaw
- Other post: Canon of Wells

Orders
- Consecration: 17 May 1293 by Richard Gravesend, William of Louth, and Thomas of Wouldham

Personal details
- Died: 11 June 1302
- Buried: Wells Cathedral
- Denomination: Roman Catholic

Treasurer
- In office August 1290 – August 1295
- Monarch: Edward I of England
- Preceded by: John Kirkby
- Succeeded by: John Droxford

William of March (or William March; died 1302) was a medieval Treasurer of England and a Bishop of Bath and Wells.

== Life ==
William was always referred to as magister, and may have attended and graduated from Oxford University. He was controller of the wardrobe from 1283 to 1290 and Dean of St. Martin's-le-Grand before being selected as Treasurer in August 1290. He was Treasurer until he was dismissed in August 1295. While treasurer, he introduced the practice of keeping Exchequer Journal rolls, or as accountants know them day books, which recorded the total amount in the treasury at the start of each day along with all payments made that day. This practice began in 1293 and did not record any payments made before taxes arrived at the treasury.

William was a canon of Wells by 20 March 1291 and a royal clerk.

William was elected bishop on 30 January 1293 and consecrated on 17 May 1293. As treasurer he was instrumental in putting forward administrative changes in the way the department was run. For the first time, monies coming into the treasury were recorded on special accounts and the officials of the department became more involved in the collection and assessment of taxes and other varieties of income. However, in August 1295 William was dismissed as treasurer, although the financial policies did not change. It may be that King Edward I used March as a scapegoat, or it may be that some charges that citizens of London brought against the treasurer were felt to be valid. After his dismissal from the treasurership in 1295, he devoted himself to the care of his diocese, and was regarded as a pious bishop.

William died on 11 June 1302, although current historical research challenges that date. He was buried at Wells Cathedral in the south transept wall on 17 June 1302. In 1325 there was a petition for him to be canonized, which continued to be supported by kings Edward II and Edward III. William is supposed to have built the chapter house at Wells. His will named a brother, John March, and a nephew, Robert Urry, to whom William left monies to go on crusade in William's name.

== Citations ==
Political offices
Preceded by John Kirkby	Lord High Treasurer; 1290–1295	Succeeded by John Droxford
Catholic Church titles
Preceded by Robert Burnell	Bishop of Bath and Wells; 1293–1302	Succeeded by Walter Haselshaw
