= John of Fountains =

13th-century Bishop of Ely

- Bishop of Ely
- Elected: c. 24 January 1220
- Predecessor: Robert of York
- Successor: Geoffrey de Burgo
- Other post: Abbot of Fountains

Orders
- Consecration: 8 March 1220 by Stephen Langton

Personal details
- Died: 6 May 1225
- Buried: Ely Cathedral
- Denomination: Catholic

John of Fountains (died 6 May 1225) was a medieval Bishop of Ely.

== Life ==
John was abbot of Fountains Abbey by 13 December 1211, when he was blessed at Melrose by the bishop of Down. Nothing is known of his family or background before this event. While abbot, he continued the building of the abbey's church, and Pope Honorius III named him to a commission with Stephen Langton the Archbishop of Canterbury and William de Cornhill the Bishop of Coventry to investigate the possible canonization of Hugh of Lincoln.

John was elected to the see of Ely about 24 January 1220. He was consecrated bishop on 8 March 1220 at London by Langton. He was enthroned at Ely Cathedral on 25 March 1220. He owed his election to the papal legate Pandulf Verraccio. While bishop, the pope once more named him to a canonization commission, this time in 1223 for William of York. He was rarely involved in political matters, but did go to France on a diplomatic mission in 1223.

John died on 6 May 1225. He was buried in Ely Cathedral, at first near the altar of St. Andrew, but after a rebuilding effort by Hugh of Northwold he was reinterred near the high altar. His tomb was described as "in the pavement".

== Citations ==
Catholic Church titles
Preceded by Robert of York	Bishop of Ely; 1220–1225	Succeeded by Geoffrey de Burgo
