= John de Benstede =

Sir John de Benstede KB (c.1275 –1323/4) was a prominent member of the English royal household in the late 13th and early 14th century. He was Prebendary of Sandiacre from 3 February 1297 until, presumably, 1308, when he married. He was also King's Secretary, and he served variously as keeper of the Great Seal and controller of the wardrobe (for Edward I). He also served as Chancellor of the Exchequer from 1305 to 1306, and as a royal judge from 1309 onwards.

== In royal service ==
On the chancellor, John de Langton, going to Rome in reference to the action of the pope in annulling his election to the see of Ely, which the king had approved, the seal was delivered to Benstede, who almost immediately transferred it to William de Hamilton, afterwards (1305) Lord Chancellor. We find him again mentioned as having charge of the seal during the interval which elapsed between William de Hamilton's appointment as Chancellor (29 December 1304) and its delivery to him (16 January 1305).

In the parliament of 1305, he was one of twenty-one English members appointed to confer with the same number of Scotch representatives concerning the best means of promoting the stability of Scotland. In the same year he was made chancellor of the exchequer. This office he held until 20 August 1307, when John de Sandale was appointed in his place. In June 1307, he was entrusted by the Prince of Wales with the presentation of a petition from the Earl of Ulster and John and Eustace le Poer, praying that the king would assign such other justices in place of those already appointed as would redress certain grievances of which they complained. In the following year he was appointed keeper of the wardrobe, and in 1309 justice of the common pleas. In 1315, he was sent to Northumberland with authority to summon the barons, knights, and men-at-arms of the northern counties to meet him to concert measures for securing the border against the incursions of the Scots, and in the following year was despatched on a mission to the court of the pope for the purpose of 'expediting certain arduous matters touching the realm of Scotland and the said pope,’ but was recalled when he had got no further than Dover. He was assigned as one of the justices for the county of Hertford in 1317.

=== Peace commission abroad ===
In 1318, he acted as one of the envoys empowered to treat for peace with Robert Bruce, and in the following year was placed on a special commission to assess damages sustained by certain subjects of the Count of Flanders in 1307. In the same year (1319) he was sent, with the Bishop of Hereford and two other envoys, to Rome to urge on the pope the canonisation of Thomas de Cantilupe, bishop of Hereford in the reign of Henry III. Between 1301 and 1303 we find him in attendance upon the king in Scotland. In 1302 the king granted him the right of holding two markets weekly and one fair yearly at his manor of Ermington in Devonshire, with other privileges, and in the following year he obtained a similar grant for his manor of Bennington, Hertfordshire. In 1306 he went the northern circuit as one of the commission of trailbaston. He was appointed justice of the common bench on the accession of Edward II (1307), the king in the same year granting him the right of fortifying his house called Rosemont at Eye, near Westminster, with walls of lime and stone. Next year he attended the king in Scotland, and was also despatched with Roger Savage to Philip of France to arrange a personal interview between the two kings, which took place at Pontoise.

Between 1311 and 1321 he was regularly summoned to parliament as a justice. In 1312 we find him present on two occasions at the exchequer with the barons; but there is no reason to infer from this, with Dugdale, that he was ever regularly appointed a baron. He was probably present merely as one of the council. In 1314–15 he was employed in Scotland upon affairs of state, the nature of which does not very clearly appear. Fines were regularly levied before him between 1312 and 1320. In the latter year he resigned, William de Hale being appointed to succeed him. In 1322, he was returned by the sheriff as one of the inhabitants of Hertfordshire liable to military service, and summoned to render the same, being described as a banneret. His death probably took place in 1323, as his estates are entered amongst the escheats of the seventeenth year of Edward II's reign (July 1323–July 1324).

=== Family ===
He was twice married, the name of his first wife being Isabella, and that of his second Petronilla. At the date of his death he was possessed of estates in Devonshire, Middlesex, Hertfordshire, Essex, Wiltshire, and Hampshire. His wife Petronilla and a son, Edward, thirteen years old, survived him. Petronilla was life-tenant of a portion of the estates in right of dower. She died in 1342. The last male representative of the family, Sir William de Benstede, died in 1485.

== See also ==
- Secretary of State (England)

Preceded by Francis Accursii	King's Secretary; 1299–????	Succeeded by William de Melton
