= William Ayermin =

14th-century Bishop of Norwich, Chancellor of England, and Treasurer of England

- Bishop of Norwich
- Elected: 19 July 1325
- Term ended: 27 March 1336 (death)
- Predecessor: Robert Baldock
- Successor: Thomas Hemenhale
- Previous post: Bishop-elect of Carlisle (January–February 1325)

Orders
- Consecration: 6 February 1327

Personal details
- Died: 27 March 1336
- Denomination: Roman Catholic

William Ayermin (or Ayermine) (died 27 March 1336) was a medieval Bishop of Norwich.

== Biography ==
Ayermin, was descended from a family settled at Osgodby, Lincolnshire. He was the eldest of three brothers, of whom Richard obtained many ecclesiastical offices, and Adam became archdeacon of Norfolk. In early life William was probably a clerk of the exchequer.

Ayermin sat in the Edward II's Parliament at Carlisle for St. Augustine's Abbey, Canterbury in 1306-7. He also recorded the proceedings of Edward II's parliament at Lincoln in 1316. In August of that year he became master of the rolls and he temporarily performed for many years before and after this date the duties of both the keeper of the great seal and of the chancellor. In 1317 he was made guardian of the Jewish converts' house for life, although previously the office had only been held during the king's pleasure.

In 1319 Ayermin joined the Archbishop of York, the Bishop of Ely, and other ecclesiastics, who with a force of 8,000 men attempted to resist an invasion of the Scots in the North during the First War of Scottish Independence. The army was defeated at the Battle of Myton near the river Swale with great slaughter. William was taken prisoner, and was not released for several months.

Around about 26 May 1324 Ayermin resigned the mastership of the rolls to his brother Richard, and became keeper of the king's privy seal. In the church he meanwhile secured much preferment, although he was always manoeuvring to obtain more. He was rector of Wearmouth, and canon of St. Paul's, Lincoln Hereford, Lincoln, York, Salisbury, and Dublin. Ayermin was elected Bishop of Carlisle on 7 January 1325, following the death of John de Halton but was never consecrated as his election was quashed on 13 February 1325 and John Ross was subsequently appointed in his stead.

In July 1325 Ayermin is said by some authorities to have been staying at Rome, to have there received the news of the death of Salmon, bishop of Norwich, and to have straight away obtained Pope John XXII's nomination to the vacant see, regardless of the known intention of Edward II to bestow the bishopric on his chancellor, Robert Baldock. But there seems little doubt that William was living in France at the time, engaged in settling a dispute between the kings of England and France as to the possession of land in Aquitaine. His conduct of this business appears to have displeased Edward II, who had instructed him to offer certain concessions to France, which he failed to do. He had, however, friends at Rome, who undoubtedly obtained for him the papal nomination on 19 July 1325 to the see of Norwich, and he was consecrated on 6 February 1327.

In the course of 1326 year Ayermin returned to England, after frequent refusals to answer the king's summons to explain his recent conduct, he appears to have been reconciled to Edward II ( in spite of the suspicions with which the Despencers and Baldock viewed him) and was acting Keeper of the Great Seal, usually known as the Lord Chancellor of England, from 1326 to 1327. He vigorously supported Edward III on the abdication of Edward II, and held the office of Lord High Treasurer from 1331 to 1332.

Ayermin died 27 March 1336, at his house at Charing, near London, and was buried in Norwich Cathedral. In the opinion of Sidney Lee writing in the Dictionary of National Biography the old verdict on his career, which stigmatised him as "crafty covetous, and treasonable", seems substantially just.

== Citations ==
Political offices
Preceded by Robert Ayleston	Lord Privy Seal; 1324–1325	Succeeded by Henry Cliff
Preceded by Robert Baldock	Lord Chancellor; 1326–1327	Succeeded by Henry Burghersh
Preceded by William Melton	Lord High Treasurer; 1331–1332	Succeeded by Robert Ayleston
Catholic Church titles
Preceded by John de Halton (bishop)	Bishop-elect of Carlisle; January–February 1325	Succeeded by John Ross (bishop)
Preceded by Robert Baldock	Bishop of Norwich; 1325–1336	Succeeded by Thomas Hemenhale
