= Gilbert Segrave =

14th-century Bishop of London

- Bishop of London
- Elected: 17 August 1313
- Term ended: 18 December 1316
- Predecessor: Ralph Baldock
- Successor: Richard Newport

Orders
- Consecration: 25 November 1313

Personal details
- Born: 1266
- Died: 18 December 1316 (aged 49–50) Pons, Poitou
- Denomination: Roman Catholic

Gilbert Segrave (1266 – 1316) was a medieval Bishop of London. He was the son of Nicholas Segrave, 1st Baron Segrave.

Segrave obtained the living of Kegworth, Leicestershire in 1279. He was then, with a dispensation for plurality, given the livings of both Harlaxton, Staffordshire in 1282 and Aylestone, Leicestershire in 1292.

Segrave was elected as Bishop of London on 17 August, that election confirmed on 17 September and consecrated on 25 November 1313. Segrave died on 18 December 1316.

== Citations ==
Catholic Church titles
Preceded by Ralph Baldock	Bishop of London; 1313–1316	Succeeded by Richard Newport
