= Gilbert of St Leonard =

13th and 14th-century Bishop of Chichester

- Bishop of Chichester
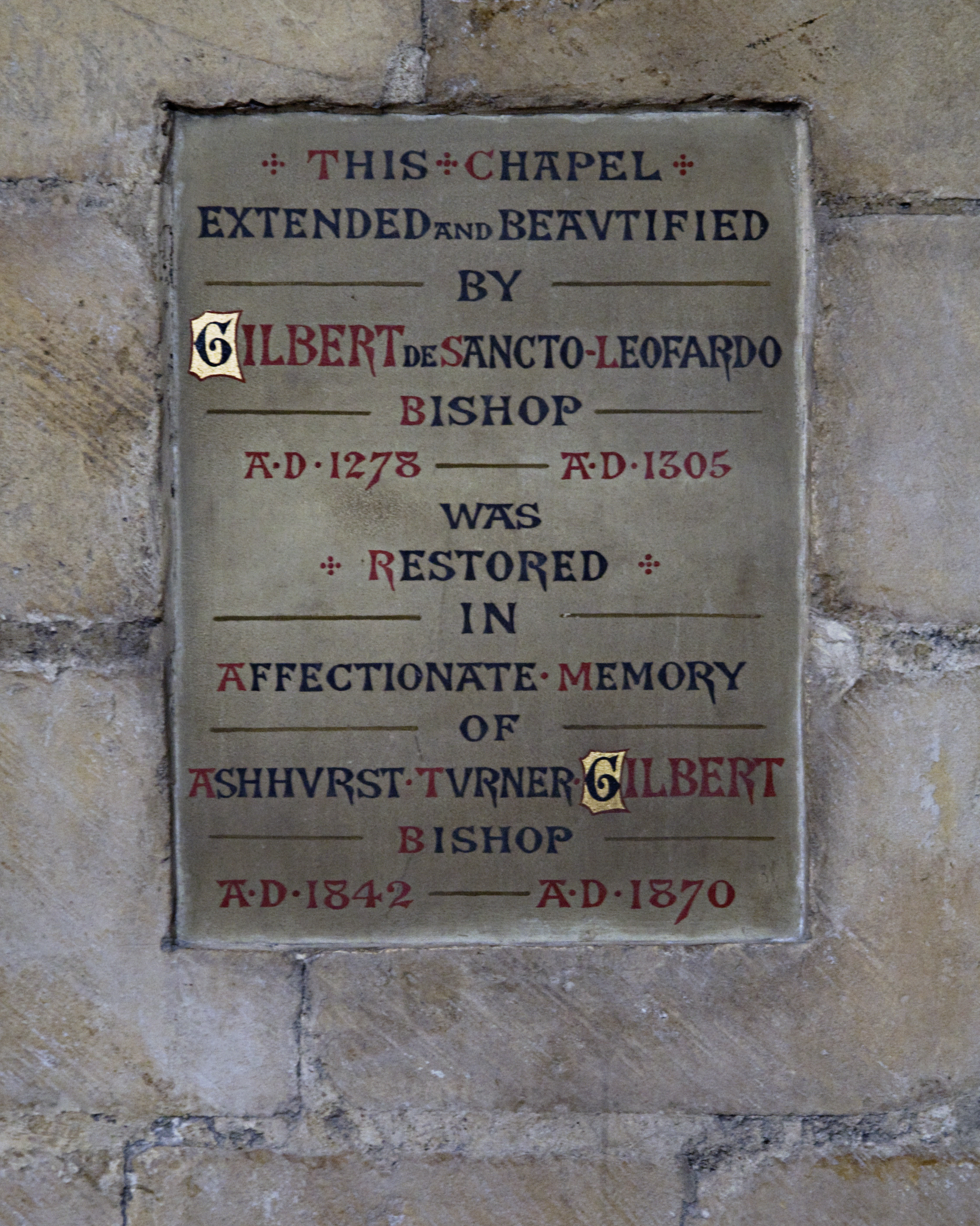
- Sign memorializing Gilbert in Chichester Cathedral
- Elected: 30 January 1288
- Term ended: 12 February 1305
- Predecessor: Stephen Bersted
- Successor: John Langton
- Other post: Treasurer of Chichester

Orders
- Consecration: 5 September 1288

Personal details
- Died: 12 February 1305 Amberley, West Sussex
- Buried: Chichester Cathedral

Gilbert de St Leonard (or Gilbert de St. Leofard; died 1305) was a medieval Bishop of Chichester.

== Life ==
Gilbert was probably a native of France, deriving his name from the college of St Liphard at Meung-sur-Loire near Orléans. He was trained as a canon lawyer and first appears in England in 1254, perhaps having come to England because of the suspension of the University of Paris in 1253. He taught at Oxford University until 1256, when he probably started working for the bishop of Ely. He was a canon of Chichester Cathedral by 28 December 1264. He shared the views of his bishop, Stephen Bersted, in the baronial party that was led by Simon de Montfort. He served the papal legate Ottobon in 1266. In 1268, Walter Giffard, Archbishop of York, was employing him as an official, but in the late 1270s he returned to Chichester, probably before Walter Giffard's death in 1279. By 5 April 1279 he was Treasurer of Chichester. He was elected to the see of Chichester on 30 January 1288, and consecrated on 5 September 1288 at Canterbury.

While he was bishop, Gilbert spent lavishly on expanding his cathedral and on gifts to King Edward I of England. It was Gilbert that baptised Edward's youngest son Edmund in 1301 at Woodstock. He died on 12 February 1305 at Amberley. He was buried in the lady chapel of Chichester Cathedral, where his tomb was destroyed in 1538.

== Citations ==
Catholic Church titles
Preceded by Stephen Bersted	Bishop of Chichester; 1288–1305	Succeeded by John Langton
