= William of Kilkenny =

Bishop of Ely and Chancellor of England (died 1256)

- Bishop of Ely
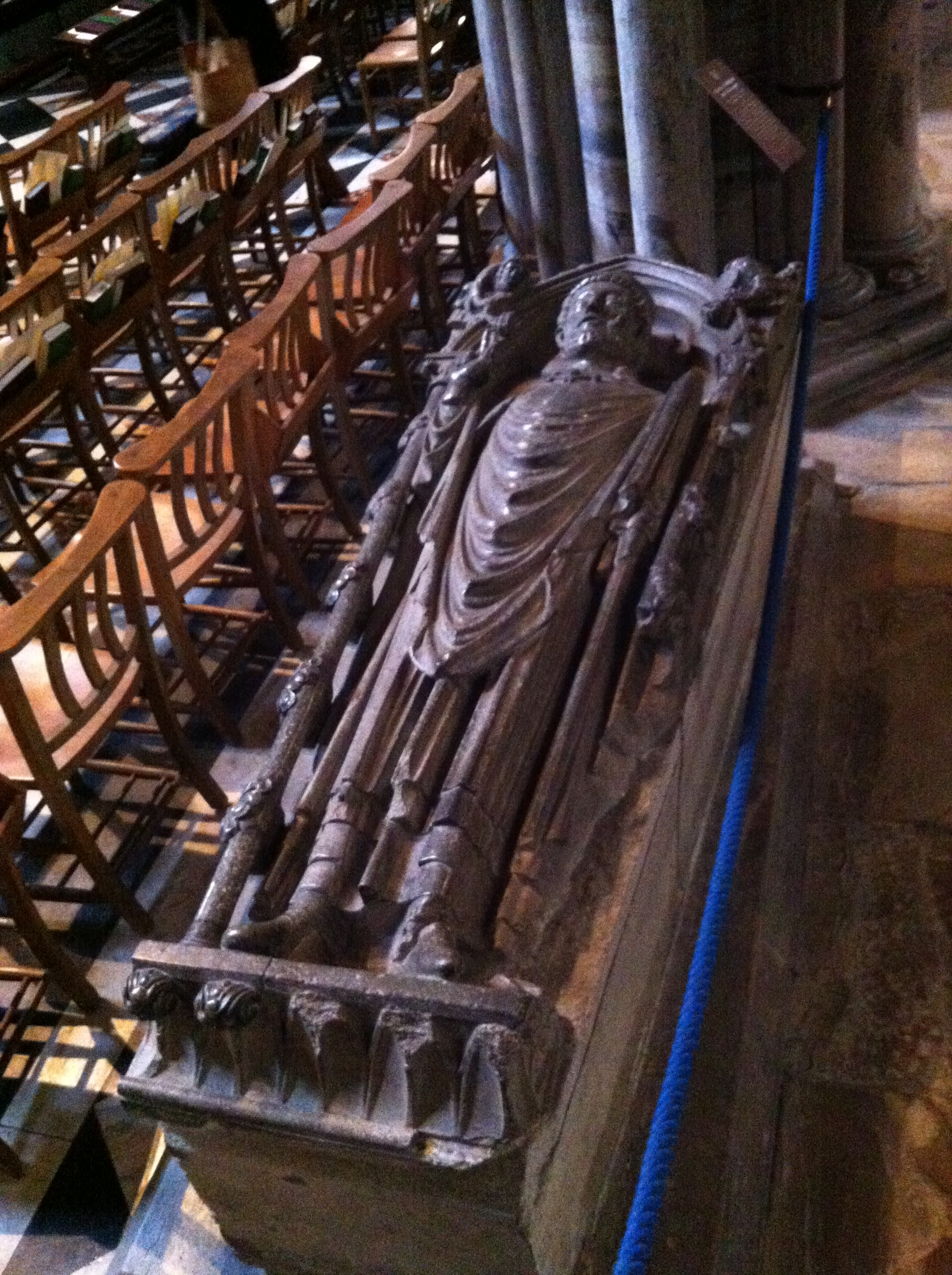
- Memorial to Bishop William de Kilkenny in Ely Cathedral
- Elected: c. 29 September 1254
- Term ended: 21 September 1256
- Predecessor: Hugh of Northwold
- Successor: Hugh of Balsham
- Other post: Archdeacon of Coventry

Orders
- Consecration: 15 August 1255 by Boniface of Savoy

Personal details
- Died: 21 September 1256 Spain
- Denomination: Catholic

Lord Chancellor
- In office 1250–1255
- Monarch: Henry III of England
- Preceded by: John Lexington
- Succeeded by: Henry Wingham

William of Kilkenny (died 21 September 1256) was a Lord Chancellor of England and Bishop of Ely.

== Life ==
William may be the same William of Kilkenny who was elected Bishop of Ossory in 1231, but resigned the office in 1232 before being consecrated. Whether or not that was the case, the man who later became bishop of Ely was a king's clerk by 1234. He was sent to Rome on royal business twice, once in 1234–1235 and again in 1237. In 1238 he left royal service, and was employed by two successive bishops of Durham, Nicholas of Farnham and Richard Poore. By May 1247 he was back in royal service, for in that month King Henry III of England sent him overseas.

William was Archdeacon of Coventry, from November 1247, as well as controller of the wardrobe from 1249 to 1252, and chancellor from 1250 to 1255.

William was elected to the see of Ely about 29 September 1254 and consecrated on 15 August 1255 at Bellay in Savoy by the Archbishop of Canterbury, Boniface of Savoy.

William died on 21 September 1256, in Spain where he had gone on a diplomatic mission for the king. His heart was sent to Ely for burial in Ely Cathedral. His only known relative was a nephew who held land in Waterford and was knighted in 1254. He had constructed an elaborate tomb that remained empty, and is now located near the high altar in the north choir aisle of Ely Cathedral. His heart was buried near the altar of Saint Etheldreda.

== Citations ==
Political offices
| Preceded by John Lexington | Lord Chancellor; 1250–1255 | Succeeded by Henry Wingham |
Catholic Church titles
| Preceded by Hugh of Northwold | Bishop of Ely; 1254–1256 | Succeeded by Hugh of Balsham |
