= Thomas Hannibal =

Dr. Thomas Hannibal (died 1531) was an English judge who was Master of the Rolls between 1523 and 1527.
