= Hugh de Balsham =

Bishop of Ely (died 1286)

- Bishop of Ely
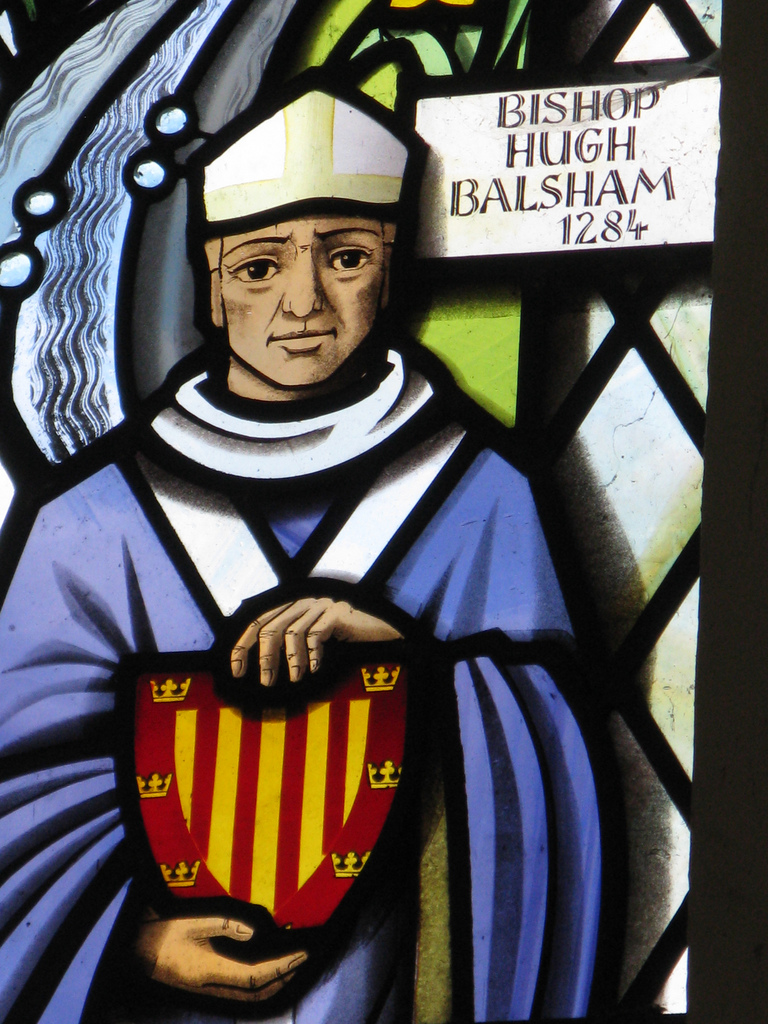
- Balsham shown in the window of Thriplow church in Cambridgeshire, holding the Peterhouse coat of arms
- Elected: 1256
- Term ended: 16 June 1286
- Predecessor: William of Kilkenny
- Successor: John Kirkby
- Other post: sub-prior of Ely

Orders
- Consecration: 14 October 1257 by Pope Alexander IV

Personal details
- Died: 16 June 1286 Doddington manor, Doddington, Cambridgeshire, England
- Buried: 24 June 1286; Ely Cathedral
- Denomination: Catholic

Hugh de Balsham (or Hugo; died 16 June 1286) was a medieval English bishop.

== Life ==
Nothing is known of Balsham's background, although during the dispute over his election he was alleged to have been of servile birth, and his name suggests a connection with the Cambridgeshire village of Balsham. He was a Benedictine monk at Ely, and appears first as sub-prior of the cathedral chapter there. On the death of William of Kilkenny in 1256 the monks elected him Bishop of Ely, to the annoyance of King Henry III of England and Boniface of Savoy, the Archbishop of Canterbury. Boniface declared the election invalid, and attempted to install Adam Marsh in the see. Both sides appealed to Rome. The election was confirmed by Pope Alexander IV in 1257.

Balsham was consecrated on 14 October 1257 by the pope. Balsham also promised that he would visit Rome every three years, but he was released from this promise in 1278.

Balsham legislated against the sale of the sacraments. He was present at the Parliament held at London in June 1264 that set up the government of Simon de Montfort. Much of Balsham's time was spent in repairing damage done to his diocese by various people, first the royal administrators during the election dispute, and then later some of the baronial supporters who occupied the Isle of Ely in 1265. The bishop issued statues for his diocese, and worked to improve the administration of the diocese. He promoted the cult of Ethelreda, the local saint of Ely. Gifts to the monks of the cathedral chapter as well as to churches in his diocese contributed to his reputation as a good bishop.

Balsham played an important role in the early history of Cambridge University. In 1280, he obtained a charter from the king allowing him to replace the secular brethren residing in the diocesan hospital of St John at Cambridge by "studious scholars"; a second charter four years later entirely differentiated these scholars from the brethren of the hospital, and for them Balsham founded and endowed the college of Peterhouse, the first Cambridge college. He left 200 pounds to the college in his will.

Balsham died on 16 June 1286 at the manor of Doddington on the Isle of Ely. He was buried in Ely Cathedral on 24 June 1286. A monumental brass in the church at Balsham, Cambridgeshire, supposedly depicts the bishop. An unidentified tomb slab now in Ely Cathedral has sometimes been identified as his, but this identification is not secure.

== Citations ==
Catholic Church titles
Preceded by William of Kilkenny	Bishop of Ely; 1256–1286	Succeeded by John Kirkby
