= Stephen Bersted =

13th-century Bishop of Chichester

- Bishop of Chichester
- Elected: 1262
- Term ended: 21 October 1287
- Predecessor: John Climping
- Successor: Gilbert of St Leonard
- Other post: Canon of Chichester

Orders
- Consecration: 24 September 1262

Personal details
- Died: 21 October 1287

Stephen Bersted (Note: Sometimes Stephen of Pagham or Stephen de Berksted) (died 1287) was a medieval Bishop of Chichester.

== Life ==
Bersted was from a humble background, and came from Bersted, Sussex which at the time was part of the archbishop of Canterbury's estate at Pagham. He studied at Oxford University, and was a regent of theology there for a time. He was a canon of Chichester and a chaplain to Richard of Chichester when Richard was bishop of Chichester. Bersted was elected to the see of Chichester between 26 May and 20 June 1262. He was consecrated on 24 September 1262 at Canterbury. He was a supporter of Simon de Montfort which earned him a suspension from office on 1 December 1265 by the papal legate Ottobuono, but after traveling to Rome, he was absolved by Pope Gregory X on 26 November 1272. King Edward I of England however, confiscated his lands on his return from Rome, only restoring them to the bishop on 20 April 1273. Stephen served as one of the three electors of the nine members of the council that Montfort set up after the Battle of Lewes in 1264. Bersted served with Montfort himself and Gilbert de Clare, Earl of Gloucester. By June 1276 he was back in royal favor, for King Edward I of England attended the ceremony held that month where Bersted oversaw the translation of the relics of Richard of Chichester to a new shrine.

Bersted became blind a few years before he died on 21 October 1287. He was probably related to Thomas Bersted who was Dean of Chichester, and another Stephen of Bersted who was also a canon of Chichester.

== Citations ==
Catholic Church titles
Preceded by John Climping	Bishop of Chichester; 1262–1287	Succeeded by Gilbert of St Leonard
