= Baldoc =

Baldoc may refer to:

- Baldoc, Pandan, a barangay of Pandan, Catanduanes
- Cosmin Baldoc, a contestant in the 2007 FINA Men's Water Polo World League
- Neil Baldoc, an engineer on Reasons for Voyaging
- Ralph de Baldoc, a mediaeval Bishop of London

== See also ==
- Baldock
