= Walter Haselshaw =

14th-century Bishop of Bath and Wells

- Bishop of Bath and Wells
- Elected: 7 August 1302
- Term ended: 11 December 1308
- Predecessor: William of March
- Successor: John Droxford

Orders
- Consecration: 4 November 1302

Personal details
- Died: 11 December 1308
- Denomination: Catholic

Walter Haselshaw was a medieval English Bishop of Bath and Wells. He was elected 7 August 1302 and consecrated 4 November 1302. He died 11 December 1308.

== Citations ==
Catholic Church titles
Preceded by William of March	Bishop of Bath and Wells; 1302–1308	Succeeded by John Droxford
