= John Ketton =

14th-century Bishop of Ely

- Bishop of Ely
- Elected: 2 March 1310
- Term ended: 14 May 1316
- Predecessor: Robert Orford
- Successor: John Hotham

Orders
- Consecration: 6 September 1310

Personal details
- Died: 14 May 1316
- Denomination: Catholic

John Ketton (died 1316) was a medieval Bishop of Ely.

Ketton was elected to Ely on 2 March 1310 and consecrated on 6 September 1310. He died on 14 May 1316.

His executors are named as Godfrey de Walpole, John Caleys and Richard Ieken, in 1326 <Plea Rolls of the Court of Common Pleas; CP 40/263; image: http://aalt.law.uh.edu/E2/CP40no263/aCP40no263fronts/IMG_0211.htm >

== Citations ==
Catholic Church titles
| Preceded by Robert Orford | Bishop of Ely; 1310–1316 | Succeeded by John Hotham |
