= John Droxford =

14th-century Bishop of Bath and Wells and Treasurer of England

- Bishop of Bath and Wells
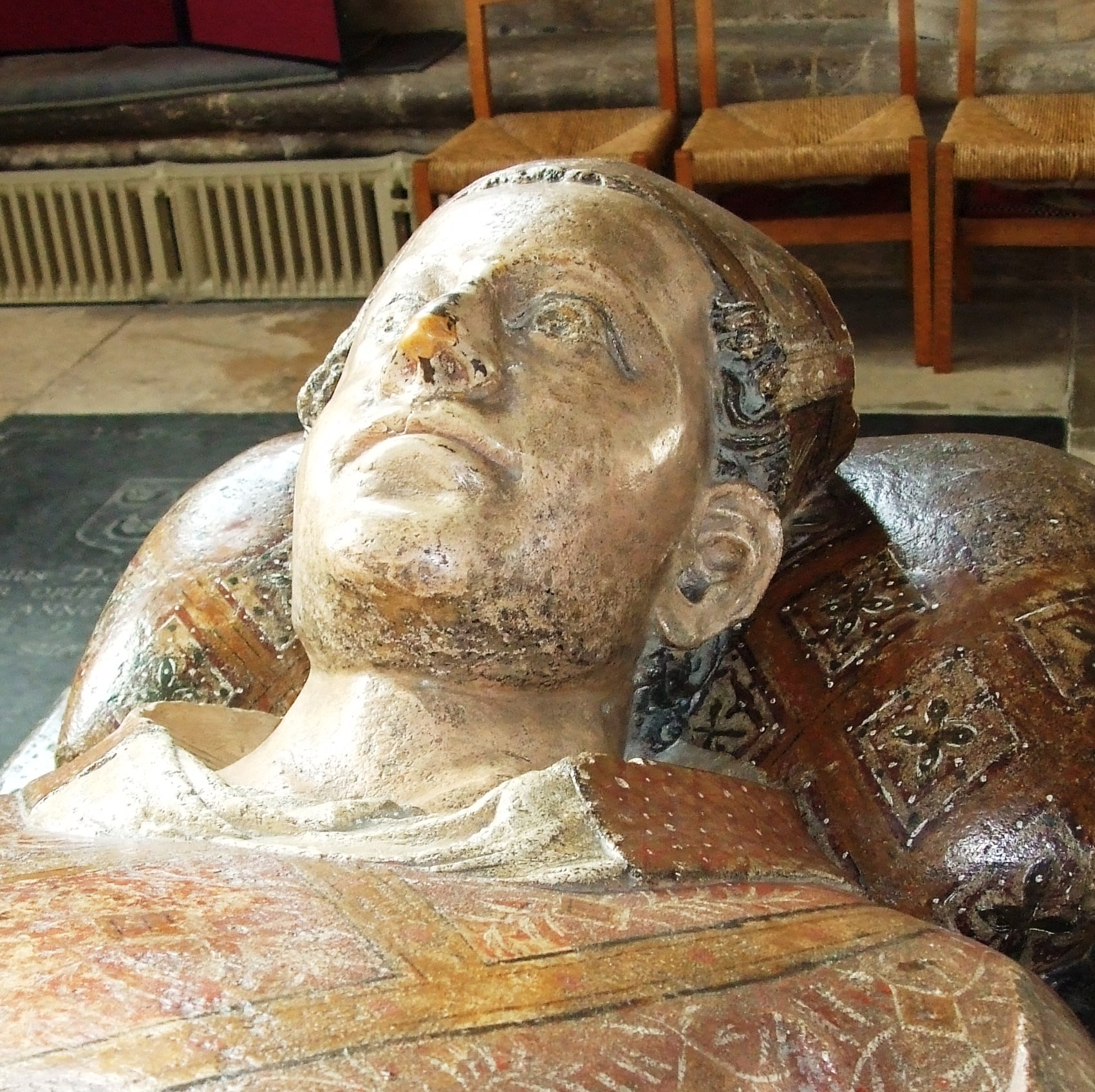
- Effigy of John Droxford in Wells Cathedral
- Elected: 5 February 1309
- Term ended: 9 May 1329
- Predecessor: Walter Haselshaw
- Successor: Ralph of Shrewsbury

Orders
- Consecration: 9 November 1309

Personal details
- Died: 9 May 1329
- Buried: Wells Cathedral
- Denomination: Catholic

acting-Treasurer
- In office 16 August 1295 – 28 September 1295
- Monarch: Edward I of England
- Preceded by: William of March
- Succeeded by: Walter Langton

John Droxford (sometimes John Drokensford; died 9 May 1329), was a Bishop of Bath and Wells. He was elected 5 February 1309 and consecrated 9 November 1309.

== Early life ==
Droxford, born probably at Drokensford, now Droxford, Hampshire, was Controller of the Wardrobe to King Edward I in 1291, and continued to hold that office until 1295, when he appears as keeper of the wardrobe (1295–1309). These offices kept him in constant attendance at court. He accompanied Edward in the expeditions he made to Scotland in 1291 and 1296. In 1297, he discharged the duties of Treasurer during a vacancy. The next year he was again busy in Scotland, and he appears to have again accompanied Edward I on the expedition of 1303–4. His services were rewarded with ecclesiastical preferments; he was rector of Droxford, of Hemingburgh and Stillingfleet in Yorkshire, and of Balsham in Cambridgeshire; he held prebends in Southwell and four other collegiate churches in England, besides certain prebends in Ireland; was installed as prebendary in the cathedral churches of Lichfield, Lincoln, and Wells; and was chaplain to the pope. His secular emoluments were also large, for he appears to have had five residences in Surrey, Hampshire, and Kent, besides a sixth estate in Chute Forest, Wiltshire, and a grant of land in Windsor Forest. He is sometimes incorrectly styled Chancellor, or Keeper of the Great Seal, simply because on one occasion, as keeper of the wardrobe, he had charge of the great seal for a few days during a vacancy.

== Chancellor and bishop ==
After the death of Edward I Droxford ceased to hold office in the wardrobe, and in the first year of King Edward II sat in the exchequer as chancellor. On 25 December 1308 the king, in sending his congé d'élire to the cathedral chapters of Bath and Wells, nominated him for election; he received the temporalities of the see on 15 May 1309, and was enthroned at Wells about twelve months afterwards. During the first four years of his episcopate he was seldom in his diocese; "political troubles" he writes, in December 1312, "having hindered our residence". In later years, though often in London and elsewhere, and paying an annual visit to his private estates, he was also much in Somerset. He did not make either Bath or Wells his headquarters, but moved about constantly, attended apparently by a large retinue, from one to another of the manor-houses, sixteen or more in number, attached to the see and used as episcopal residences. Magnificent and liberal, he was, like many of his fellow-bishops, a worldly man, and by no means blameless in the administration of his patronage, for he conferred a prebend on a member of the house of Berkeley who was a layman and a mere boy, and in the bountiful provision he made for his relations out of the revenues of his church he was not always careful to act legally. He had some disputes with his chapter, which were settled in 1321.

Although Droxford was left regent when the king and Queen Isabella crossed over to France in 1313, and was one of the commissioners to open parliament, he found himself "outrun in the race for secular preferment" in the reign of Edward II, and probably for this reason was hostile to the king. He joined in the petition for the appointment of ordainers in March 1310. In July 1321 he and others endeavoured to arrange a peace between the king and the malcontent lords at London. At the same time he was concerned in the rebellion against Edward, and in February 1323 the king wrote to Pope John XXII and the cardinals complaining of his conduct, and requesting that he should be translated to some see out of the kingdom. He signed the letter sent by the bishops to the queen in 1325 exhorting her to return to her husband, and on 13 January 1327 took the oath to support her and her son at the Guildhall of London.

== Death and legacy ==
Droxford died at his episcopal manor-house at Dogmersfield, Hampshire, on 9 May 1329, and was buried in St Katharine's Chapel in his cathedral church, where his tomb is still to be seen. Two months before his death he endowed a chantry to be established at the altar nearest to his grave.

== Citations ==
Catholic Church titles
Preceded by Walter Haselshaw	Bishop of Bath and Wells; 1309–1329	Succeeded by Ralph of Shrewsbury
