= Geoffrey de Burgh =

Bishop of Ely (c.1180–1228)

- Bishop of Ely
- Elected: June 1225
- Term ended: December 1228
- Predecessor: John of Fountains
- Successor: Hugh of Northwold
- Other post: Archdeacon of Norwich

Orders
- Consecration: 29 June 1225

Personal details
- Born: c. 1180
- Died: December 1228 (aged 47–48)
- Buried: Ely Cathedral
- Denomination: Catholic

Geoffrey de Burgh (English: /dəˈbɜːr/ də-BUR, French: [dəbuʁ]; c. 1180 – 8 December 1228) was a medieval English cleric who was Archdeacon of Norwich (1200–1225), Bishop of Ely (1215–1219, 1225–1228) and the brother of William de Burgh and Hubert de Burgh, 1st Earl of Kent.

== Life ==
Geoffrey de Burgh was the younger brother of William de Burgh, Lord of Connacht, Hubert de Burgh, Earl of Kent, and Thomas de Burgh, Castellan of Norwich. He was born no later than 1180 or so (based on his appointment as archdeacon in 1200). The name of his father is not known, but his mother's name was Alice and the family were from Norfolk, being of knightly status. The name is likely in reference to either Burgh next Aylsham or Burgh Castle.

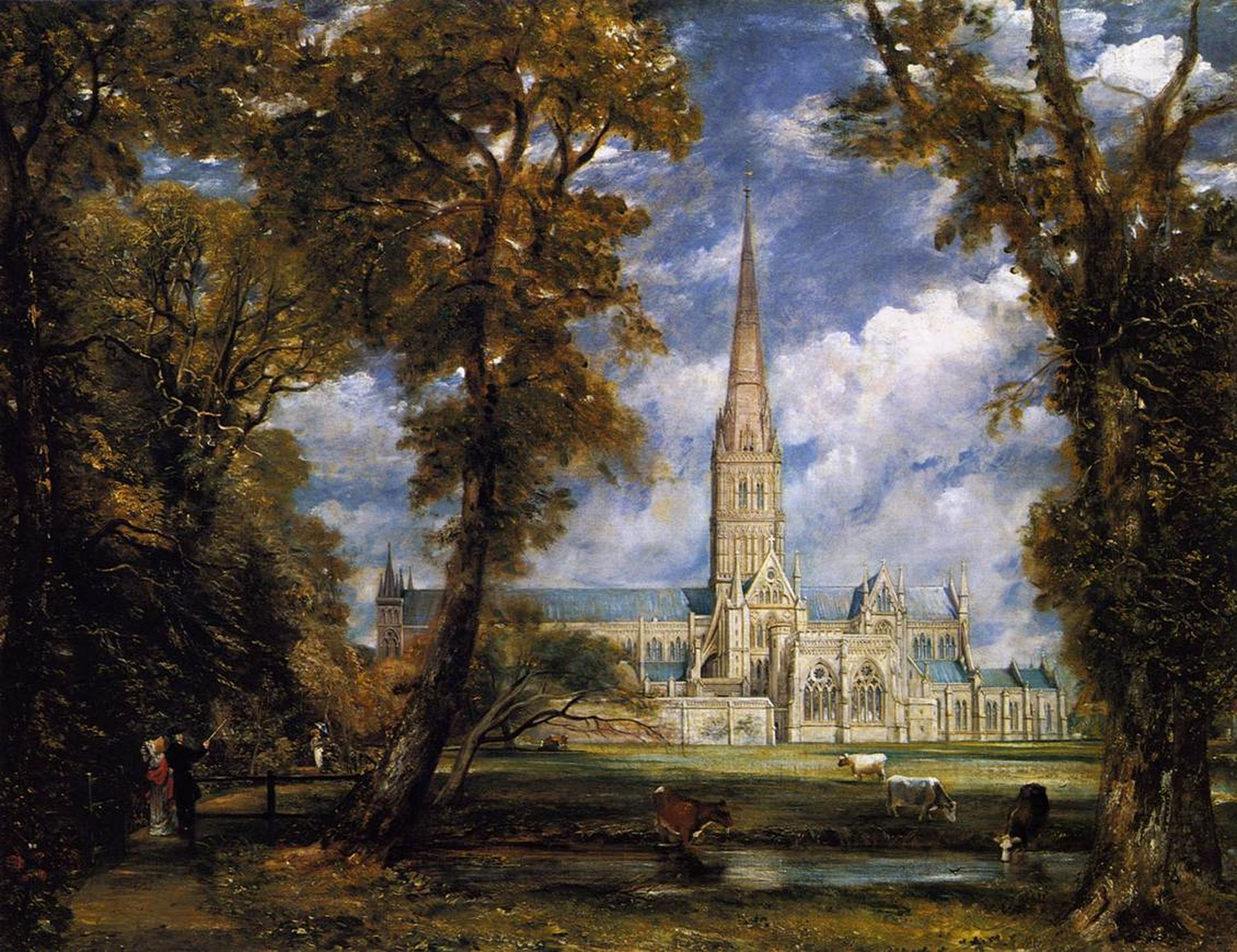
Salisbury Cathedral from the Bishop Grounds by John Constable (c. 1825)

Geoffrey was Canon of Salisbury Cathedral and Treasurer of the Exchequer before being named Archdeacon of Norwich (1200). He was elected to the see of Ely (1215), but the election was quashed by Pope Honorius III before May 1219 due to a competing election with Robert of York. The pope quashed both elections, and ordered a new election: the monks chose the Cistercian John (Abbot of Fountains Abbey).

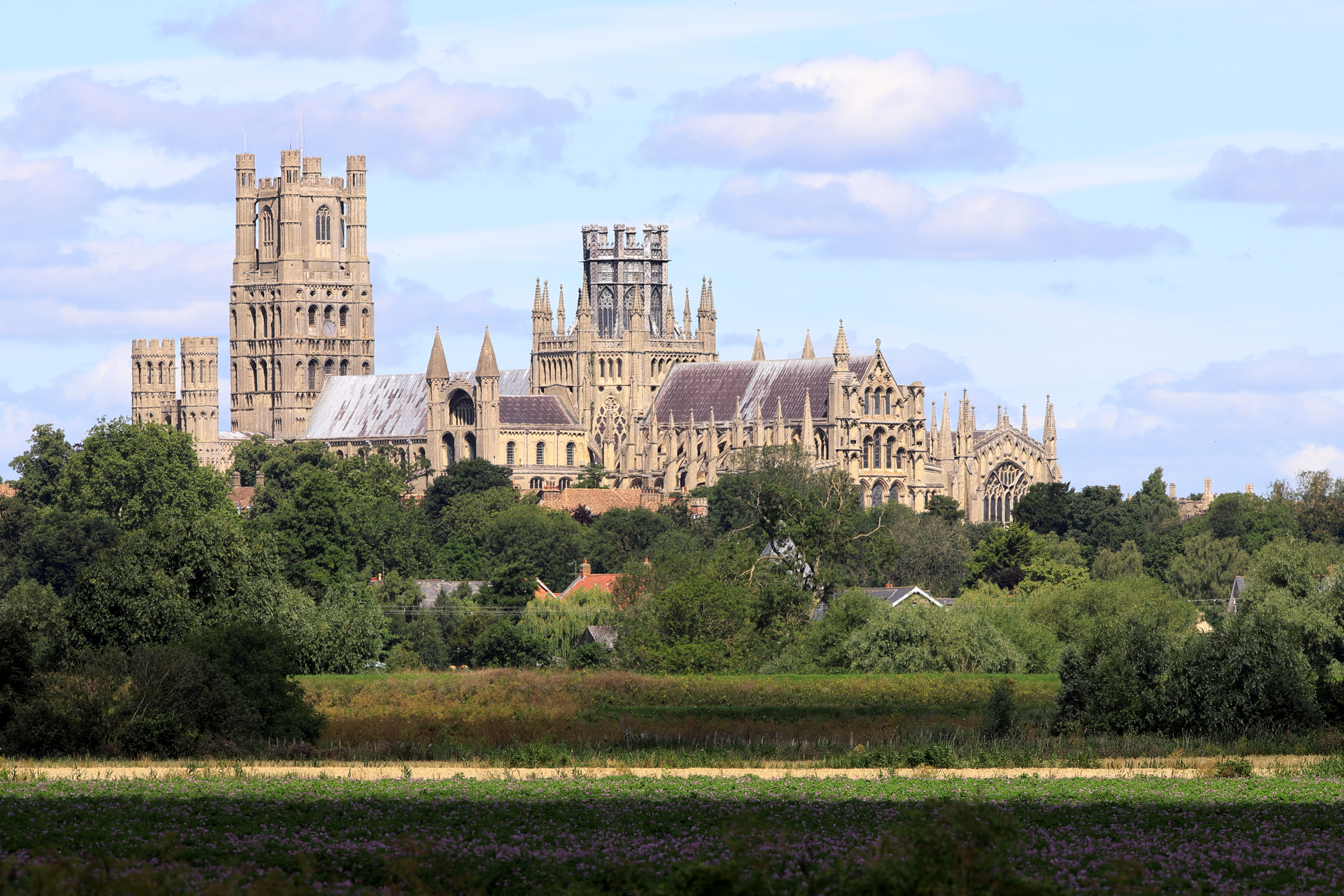
Ely Cathedral

Geoffrey was once more elected to Ely (June 1225). He owed his election to his brother, Hubert (who was Justiciar of England at the time). He was consecrated Bishop of Ely (29 June 1225) and died three years later (between 8 December and 17 December 1228). He was buried in Ely Cathedral in the north choir, though there is no surviving tomb or monument. Besides his brothers, he also had a nephew, Thomas Blunville, who Hubert had elected to the see of Norwich in 1226.

Roger of Wendover told the story of a Geoffrey, Archdeacon of Norwich, who was a victim of King John of England's cruelty: Geoffrey was thrown into prison and fitted with a lead cloak and starved to death. However, this cannot be Geoffrey de Burgh since the bishop died many years after John's death. The historian Sidney Painter suggested that the real victim may have been another Geoffrey of Norwich, known to be a justice of the Jews.

== Arms ==
Coat of arms of Geoffrey de Burgh
Notes Arms displayed by Geoffrey de Burgo, Bishop of Ely, at the signing of Magna Carta. Escutcheon Gules, three coronets Or

== See also ==
- House of Burgh, an Anglo-Norman and Hiberno-Norman dynasty founded in 1193

Catholic Church titles
Preceded by Eustace	Bishop of Ely; Election quashed 1215–1219	Succeeded by Robert of York
Preceded by John of Fountains	Bishop of Ely; 1225–1228	Succeeded by Hugh of Northwold
