= Robert of York =

13th-century Bishop of Ely-elect

- Bishop of Ely-elect
- Elected: c. 14 April 1215
- Quashed: before 11 May 1219
- Predecessor: Geoffrey de Burgo
- Successor: John of Fountains

Personal details
- Died: after December 1219
- Denomination: Catholic

Robert of York (died after 1219) was a medieval Bishop of Ely-elect.

Robert was elected to Ely about 14 April 1215 but his election was quashed before 11 May 1219 due to the prior election of Geoffrey de Burgo. Both elections were quashed by Pope Honorius III. Robert refused to accept the decision of the pope and fled to France, where he was still styling himself bishop-elect in December 1219.

== Citations ==
Catholic Church titles
Preceded by Geoffrey de Burgo	Bishop of Ely election quashed 1219; 1215–1219	Succeeded by John of Fountains
