= Lands and Liberties of the Church at Ely =

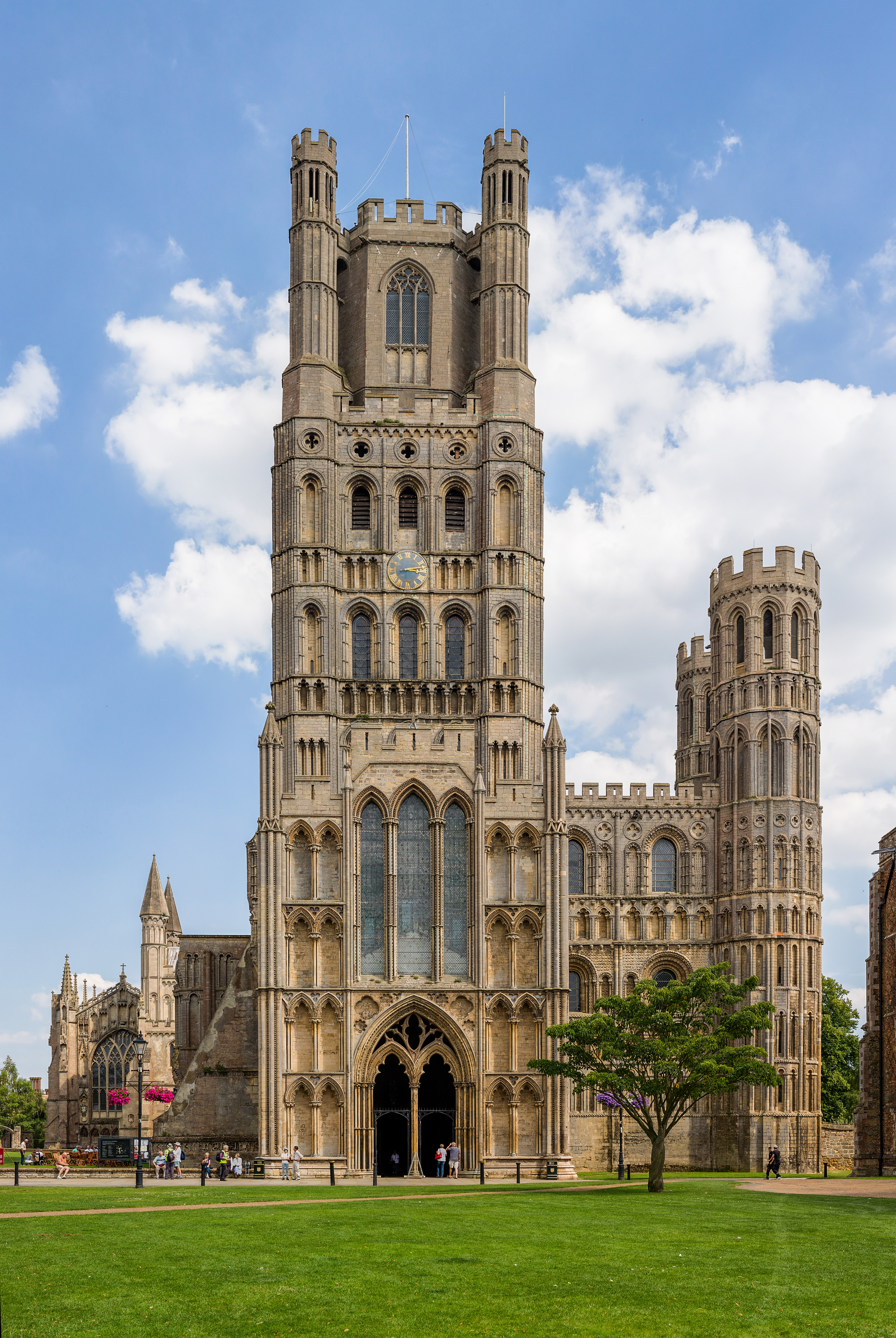
Ely Cathedral Exterior, Cambridgeshire

The Lands and Liberties of the Church at Ely was a 1080 court case and an appeal, where the Abbot of Ely sought recovery of lands that had been taken at the Conquest, 14 years beforehand.

The liberty of Ely was re-established in (King) Edgar's charters for the refounded monastery in 970. The Liber Eliensis states that Etheldreda had taken possession of the Isle of Ely in 673: 'she took possession of the Isle and had free disposal of it as her lawful property - and for evermore'.Edward the Confessor reiterated the liberties in 1052 and then William the Conqueror restated them.

Wherever the church of Ely had lands, it had its own courts where defendants in cases of theft could vouch to warranty. Severing of a hand and death were among the common penalties for significant theft.

The court case can be viewed as a part of a large collection of pleadings against a process of Normanization that within a decade saw 64% of land in England consolidated into the hands of just 150 individuals, and many of the nobility and churches deprived of their estates.
