= John Climping =

13th-century Bishop of Chichester

- Bishop of Chichester
- Elected: 20 May 1253
- Term ended: 18 May 1262
- Predecessor: Richard of Chichester
- Successor: Stephen Bersted
- Other posts: Chancellor of Chichester; Archdeacon of Chichester

Orders
- Consecration: 11 January 1154

Personal details
- Died: 18 May 1262

John Climping (Note: Sometimes John of Climping, John of Arundel or John Bishop;) (died 18 May 1262) was a medieval Bishop of Chichester.

== Life ==
Climping was a clerk of Ranulf of Wareham by 18 July 1220. By 1232 he was a canon of Chichester Cathedral and was named Archdeacon of Chichester by December 1242. He was then Chancellor of Chichester by 17 July 1247 as well as rector of Climping. He was elected to the see of Chichester on 20 May 1253, and consecrated on 11 January 1254 at Canterbury.

Climping died on 18 May 1262.

== Citations ==
Catholic Church titles
Preceded by Richard of Chichester	Bishop of Chichester; 1253–1262	Succeeded by Stephen Bersted
