= William Hamilton (Lord Chancellor) =

Deputy chancellor of England and Lord Chancellor

William Hamilton was deputy chancellor of England from 1286 to 1289, then Lord Chancellor from 1305 to his death on 20 April 1307. He was also Dean of York.

== Life ==
In 1280, he was a justice in itinere for Hampshire and Wiltshire, but for pleas of forest only. In 1282, he was custos of the bishopric of Winchester and of the abbey of Hide. He then became a clerk in chancery, and in 1286 vice-chancellor to the king, having occasional custody of the great seal. On the death of Robert Burnell on 25 October 1292, the great seal was delivered into the wardrobe under his seal, and until he set out as the bishop's executor with his corpse for the funeral at Wells he sealed writs. During absences of the next chancellor, John Langton, from 4 to 30 March, and 22 to 27 August 1297, and from 20 February to 16 June 1299, he also had charge of the great seal.

Meantime, he had received ecclesiastical preferment of various kinds. In 1287, he received the prebend of Warthill, York, and in 1288 was appointed archdeacon of the West Riding of Yorkshire, and in December 1298 dean of York. As William de Hemelthorne he is recorded as a Canon of St Cuthburga's church (Wimborne Minster in East Dorset) under Dean William de Cornere. He also held the deanery of the church of St Buryan in Cornwall. He is mentioned in the Year-Book as engaged in a lawsuit with Robert le Veyl in 1303. In December 1304, the then chancellor, Grenefield, resigned the seals in order to proceed to Rome and induce the pope to permit his consecration as archbishop of York. Hamilton, though absent, was nominated his successor by the king at Lincoln on 29 December, and until his arrival the seal was placed in the wardrobe, under the seal of Sir Adam de Osgodebey, the master of the rolls. On 16 January 1305, Hamilton returned and received the seal from the treasurer, the Bishop of Coventry. Shortly after his appointment on 6 April, he was admonished by the king in full parliament against granting letters of protection from suits brought against them to persons absent in Ireland. During his term of office, he sealed the statute de tallagio non concedendo and the commission for the trial of Sir William Wallace.

He died on 20 April 1307, while in attendance upon the king at Fountains Abbey, and was succeeded by Ralph de Baldock, bishop of London.

== Notes ==
Attribution

This article incorporates text from a publication now in the public domain: Hamilton, John Andrew (1890). "Hamilton, William de". In Stephen, Leslie; Lee, Sidney (eds.). Dictionary of National Biography. Vol. 24. London: Smith, Elder & Co.

== See also ==
- List of lord chancellors and lord keepers

Political offices
Preceded by William Greenfield	Lord Chancellor; 1305–1307	Succeeded by Ralph Baldock
