= Richard Newport (bishop) =

14th-century Bishop of London

- Bishop of London
- Elected: 27 January 1317
- Term ended: 24 August 1318
- Predecessor: Gilbert Segrave
- Successor: Stephen Gravesend

Orders
- Consecration: 15 May 1317

Personal details
- Died: 24 August 1318
- Denomination: Catholic

Richard Newport was a medieval Bishop of London.

Newport was elected 27 January 1317 and consecrated on 15 May 1317. He died on 24 August 1318.

== Citations ==
Catholic Church titles
| Preceded by Gilbert Segrave | Bishop of London; 1316–1317 | Succeeded by Stephen Gravesend |
