= Thomas Barowe =

Thomas Barowe or Barrow (died 1497?) was an English ecclesiastic and judge.

Barowe was rector of Olney, Buckinghamshire, and was appointed to a prebend in St. Stephen's Chapel in the palace of Westminster in July 1483, shortly after the accession of Richard III. In September of the same year he was granted Master of the Rolls, in succession to Robert Morton, who was dismissed on suspicion of complicity in the intrigues of his uncle John, bishop of Ely.

In December 1483 Barowe received the tun, i.e. two pipes, of wine, which it then became the custom to grant to each new master of the rolls on his appointment. On 29 July Barowe was appointed keeper of the great seal, which the Lord Chancellor, Bishop Russell, had been compelled to surrender; but on the 22nd of the following month, after the defeat and death of Richard at the Battle of Bosworth, he delivered it up to Henry VII, who appears to have retained it in his own possession until 6 March 1486, when he delivered it to John Alcock. Barowe was permitted to retain his prebend, and also a mastership in chancery which he had received from Richard III, but not the mastership of the rolls, Robert Morton resuming possession of that office without a new patent. Barowe is last mentioned as acting in the capacity of receiver of petitions in the parliament of 1496.
