= Bishop of Ely =

Diocesan bishop in the Church of England

- Bishopric

anglican
- Arms of the Bishop of Ely: Gules, three ducal coronets or
- Incumbent; Sarah Clark

Location
- Ecclesiastical province: Canterbury
- Residence: Bishop's House, Ely (since 1941); Bishop's Palace, Ely (15th century – 1941)

Information
- First holder: Hervey le Breton
- Established: 1109
- Diocese: Ely
- Cathedral: Ely Cathedral

The Bishop of Ely is the ordinary of the Church of England Diocese of Ely in the Province of Canterbury. The diocese roughly covers the county of Cambridgeshire (with the exception of the Soke of Peterborough), together with a section of north-west Norfolk and has its episcopal see in the City of Ely, Isle of Ely in Cambridgeshire, where the seat is located at the Cathedral Church of the Holy Trinity. The diocesan bishops resided at the Bishop's Palace, Ely until 1941; they now reside in Bishop's House, the former cathedral deanery.

The roots of the Diocese of Ely are ancient and the area of Ely was part of the patrimony of Saint Etheldreda. Prior to the elevation of Ely Cathedral as the seat of the diocese, it existed as first as a convent of religious sisters and later as a monastery. It was led by first by an abbess and later by an abbot. The convent was founded in the city in 673. After St Etheldreda's death in 679 she was buried outside the church. Her remains were later translated inside, the foundress being commemorated as a great Anglican saint. The monastery, and much of the city of Ely, were destroyed in the Danish invasions that began in 869 or 870. A new Benedictine monastery was built and endowed on the site by Saint Athelwold, Bishop of Winchester, in 970, in a wave of monastic refoundations which also included Peterborough and Ramsey. In the Domesday Book in 1086, the Abbot of Ely is referenced as a landholder of Foxehola. The abbey became a cathedral in 1109, after a new Diocese of Ely was created out of land taken from the Diocese of Lincoln. From that time the line of bishops begins.

== History ==
The earliest historical notice of Ely is given by the Venerable Bede who writes (Historia ecclesiastica gentis Anglorum, IV, xix):

Ely is in the province of the East Angles, a country of about six hundred families, in the nature of an island, enclosed either with marshes or waters, and therefore it has its name from the great abundance of eels which are taken in those marshes.

This district was assigned in 649 to saint Æthelthryth, daughter of Anna, king of the East Angles, as a dowry in her marriage with Tonbert of the South Girvii. After her second marriage to Ecgfrith of Northumbria, she became a nun, and in 673 returned to Ely and founded a monastery on the site of the present cathedral. As endowment she gave it her entire principality of the isle, from which subsequent Bishops of Ely derived their temporal power. Æthelthryth died in 679 and her shrine became a place of pilgrimage. In 870 the monastery was destroyed by the Danes, having already given to the Church four sainted abbesses, Æthelthryth and her sister Seaxburgh, the latter's daughter Ermenilda, and Ermenilda's daughter Werburgh. Probably under their rule there was a community of monks as well as a convent of nuns, but when in 970 the monastery was restored by King Edgar and Ethelwold it was a foundation for monks only.

For more than a century the monastery flourished, and about the year 1105 Abbot Richard suggested the creation of the See of Ely, to relieve the enormous Diocese of Lincoln. The pope's brief erecting the new bishopric was issued 21 November 1108, and on 17 October 1109 King Henry I granted his charter, the first bishop being Hervé le Breton, or Harvey (1109–1131), former Bishop of Bangor. The monastery church thus became one of the "conventual" cathedrals. Of this building the transepts and two bays of the nave already existed, and in 1170 the nave as it stands to-day (a complete and perfect specimen of late Norman work) was finished. As the bishops succeeded to the principality of St Etheldreda they enjoyed palatine power and great resources.

The Bishops of Ely frequently held high office in the State and the roll includes many names of famous statesmen, including eight Lord Chancellors and six Lord Treasurers. The Bishops of Ely spent much of their wealth on their cathedral, with the result that Ely can show examples of Gothic architecture of many periods. Another of the Bishop’s Palaces was in Wisbech on the site of the former Wisbech Castle. Thurloe's mansion which replaced it was allowed to fall into disrepair and sold to Joseph Medworth. They also had a London residence called Ely Place.

Among the bishops Geoffry Riddell (1174–1189) built the nave and began the west tower, Eustace (1198–1215) the West Porch, while Hugh de Northwold (1229–1254) rebuilt the Norman choir and John Hotham (1316–1337) rebuilt the collapsed central tower – the famous Octagon. Hugh (or Hugo) de Balsham (1258–1286) founded Peterhouse, the first college at the University of Cambridge, while John Alcock (1486–1500) was the founder of Jesus College and completed the building of the bishop's palace at Wisbech, commenced in 1478 by his predecessor John Morton later Archbishop of Canterbury.

Goodrich was a reformer and during his episcopate the monastery was dissolved. The last bishop in communion with the see of Rome was Thomas Thirlby. Since the Reformation, notable bishops have included Lancelot Andrewes, Matthew Wren, Peter Gunning and Simon Patrick who, in 1695 gave the Shambles estate in Wisbech, to provide clothing for the poor.

== List of abbesses and abbots ==
=== Convent of sisters (673–870) ===
- Etheldreda (673–679)
- Seaxburh (sister of Etheldreda; 679–c.699)
- Ermenilda (daughter of Seaxburh and Eorcenberht of Kent; c.699–c.700)
- Werburh (born c.675, daughter of Ermenilda and Wulfhere of Mercia)
- ?

=== Benedictine monastery (970–1109) ===
- Brythnoth (970–996/999)
- Ælfsige (996/999–1016)
- Leofwine (1019–1022, 1022–1023)
- Leofric (1022, 1023–1029)
- Leofsige (1029–1044)
- Wulfric (1044 or 1045–1066)
- Thurstan (–1072) – the last Saxon abbot
- Theodwin (secular governor)
- Godfrey (secular governor)
- Simeon (1082–1094) – began building the cathedral
- Ranulf Flambard (as custodian 1093–1100)
- Richard FitzRichard de Clare (1100–1107) – the last abbot
- Hervey, Bishop of Bangor (as custodian 1107–1109)

== List of bishops (1109–) ==
From then on, Ely was under the Bishop of Ely.

=== Pre-Reformation bishops ===
Pre-Reformation Bishops of Ely
From	Until	Incumbent	Notes
1109	1131	Hervey le Breton	Translated from Bangor.
1133	1169	Nigel	
1174	1189	Geoffrey Ridel	
1189	1197	William Longchamp	
1198	1215	Eustace	
1215	1219	Robert of York	Election quashed 1219.
1220	1225	John of Fountains	
1225	1228	Geoffrey de Burgh	
1229	1254	Hugh of Northwold	
1255	1256	William of Kilkenny	
1258	1286	Hugh de Balsham	
1286	1290	John Kirkby	
1290	1298	William of Louth	
1298	1299	John Salmon	Monks' candidate; opposed Langton; election quashed.
1298	1299	John Langton	King's candidate; opposed Salmon; election quashed.
1299	1302	Ralph Walpole	Translated from Norwich.
1302	1310	Robert Orford	
1310	1316	John Ketton	
1316	1337	John Hotham	
1337	1345	Simon Montacute	Translated from Worcester.
1345	1361	Thomas de Lisle	
1362	1366	Simon Langham	Translated to Canterbury.
1367	1373	John Barnet	
1374	1388	Thomas Arundel	Translated to York.
1388	1425	John Fordham	Translated from Durham.
1426	1438	Philip Morgan	Translated from Worcester.
1438	1443	Lewis of Luxembourg	Archbishop of Rouen. Held Ely in commendam.
1444	1454	Thomas Bourchier	Translated to Canterbury.
1454	1478	William Grey	
1479	1486	John Morton	Translated to Canterbury.
1486	1500	John Alcock	Translated from Worcester.
1501	1505	Richard Redman	Translated from Exeter.
1506	1515	James Stanley	
1515	1533	Nicholas West	

=== Bishops during the Reformation ===
Bishops of Ely during the Reformation
From	Until	Incumbent	Notes
1534	1554	Thomas Goodrich	Also recorded as Thomas Goodricke.
1554	1559	Thomas Thirlby	Translated from Norwich; deprived on 5 July 1559.

=== Post-Reformation bishops ===
Post-Reformation Bishops of Ely
From	Until	Incumbent	Notes
1559	1581	Richard Cox	
1581	1600	See vacant	
1600	1609	Martin Heton	
1609	1619	Lancelot Andrewes	Translated from Chichester; translated to Winchester.
1619	1628	Nicholas Felton	Translated from Bristol.
1628	1631	John Buckeridge	Translated from Rochester.
1631	1638	Francis White	Translated from Norwich.
1638	1646	Matthew Wren	Translated from Norwich; deprived of the see when the English episcopacy was abolished by Parliament on 9 October 1646.
1646	1660	The see was abolished during the Commonwealth and the Protectorate.	
1660	1667	Matthew Wren	Restored; died in office.
1667	1675	Benjamin Lany	Translated from Lincoln.
1675	1684	Peter Gunning	Translated from Chichester.
1684	1691	Francis Turner	Translated from Rochester.
1691	1707	Simon Patrick	Translated from Chichester.
1707	1714	John Moore	Translated from Norwich.
1714	1723	William Fleetwood	Translated from St Asaph.
1723	1738	Thomas Green	Translated from Norwich.
1738	1748	Robert Butts	Translated from Norwich.
1748	1754	Thomas Gooch	Translated from Norwich.
1754	1771	Matthias Mawson	Translated from Chichester.
1771	1781	Edmund Keene	Translated from Chester.
1781	1808	James Yorke	Translated from Gloucester.
1808	1812	Thomas Dampier	Translated from Rochester.
1812	1836	Bowyer Sparke	Translated from Chester.
1836	1845	Joseph Allen	Translated from Bristol.
1845	1864	Thomas Turton	
1864	1873	Harold Browne	Translated to Winchester.
1873	1885	James Woodford	
1886	1905	Lord Alwyne Compton	
1905	1924	Frederic Chase	
1924	1933	Leonard White-Thomson	
1934	1941	Bernard Heywood	Translated from Hull.
1941	1956	Edward Wynn	
1957	1964	Noel Hudson	Translated from Newcastle.
1964	1977	Edward Roberts	Translated from Kensington.
1977	1990	Peter Walker	Translated from Dorchester.
1990	2000	Stephen Sykes	Returned to academia
2000	2010	Anthony Russell	Translated from Dorchester.
2010	2023	Stephen Conway	Translated from Ramsbury; translated to Lincoln
2023	2026	Dagmar Winter	Bishop of Huntingdon - acting diocesan bishop during the vacancy in See.
2026	onwards	Sarah Clark	Translated from Jarrow.

== Assistant bishops ==
Among those who have served as assistant bishops of the diocese have been:

- 1907–1914: Noel Hodges, Rector of St Cuthbert's, Bedford; also Archdeacon of Bedford from 1910 (former Bishop of Travancore and Cochin and Assistant Bishop of Durham; later of St Albans)
- 1919 – 1941 (d.): Horace Price, Archdeacon of Ely, Vicar of Pampisford (until 1921) and Canon Residentiary of Ely Cathedral (from 1921); former Bishop in Fukien
- 1942 – 1971 (d.): Gordon Walsh, Canon Residentiary of Ely Cathedral (until 1967), Vice-Dean of Ely (1956–1967) and former Bishop of Hokkaido

== See also ==
- Lands and Liberties of the Church at Ely
- Liberty of Ely
