= Stephen Gravesend =

14th-century Bishop of London

- Bishop of London
- Elected: 1 September 1318
- Term ended: 8 April 1338
- Predecessor: Richard Newport
- Successor: Richard de Wentworth

Orders
- Consecration: 14 January 1319

Personal details
- Died: 8 April 1338
- Denomination: Catholic

Stephen Gravesend was a medieval Bishop of London.

Gravesend was elected 1 September 1318 and consecrated on 14 January 1319. He died on 8 April 1338.

Gravesend, along with Archbishop Melton, John Ross and Hamo Hethe, alone spoke up in Edward II's defence during the Parliamentary session that deposed Edward.

== Citations ==
Catholic Church titles
Preceded by Richard Newport	Bishop of London; 1318–1338	Succeeded by Richard de Wentworth
