= Ralph Walpole =

13th and 14th-century Bishop of Ely and Bishop of Norwich

- Bishop of Ely
- Appointed: 5 June 1299
- Term ended: 20 March 1302
- Predecessor: John Langton
- Successor: Robert Orford
- Other posts: Archdeacon of Ely; Bishop of Norwich

Orders
- Consecration: 20 March 1289

Personal details
- Died: 20 March 1302
- Denomination: Roman Catholic

Ralph Walpole (died 1302) was a medieval Bishop of Norwich and Bishop of Ely.

== Life ==
Walpole was Archdeacon of Ely by 6 February 1272.

Walpole was elected to the see of Norwich on 11 November 1288 and consecrated on 20 March 1289.

Walpole was translated to the see of Ely on 5 June 1299. He died on 20 March 1302.

== Citations ==
Catholic Church titles
Preceded by William Middleton	Bishop of Norwich; 1288–1299	Succeeded by John Salmon
Preceded by John Langton	Bishop of Ely; 1299–1302	Succeeded by Robert Orford
