= Master of the Rolls =

Second most senior judge in England and Wales

Master of the Rolls of England and Wales
- The Judiciary of England and Wales
- Incumbent; Sir Colin Birss since 1 November 2026
- Style: The Right Honourable
- Nominator: Judicial Appointments Commission
- Appointer: The Sovereign on recommendation of Prime Minister and Lord Chancellor, who are in turn given recommendations by a selection panel
- Term length: Life tenure; Retirement at age 75
- Inaugural holder: John Langton
- Formation: Before 2 September 1286
- Salary: £238,868
- Website: The Judiciary of England and Wales

The Keeper or Master of the Rolls and Records of the Chancery of England, known as the Master of the Rolls, is the President of the Civil Division of the Court of Appeal of England and Wales and Head of Civil Justice. As a judge, the Master of the Rolls is second in seniority in England and Wales only to the Lord Chief Justice. The position dates from at least 1286, although it is believed that the office probably existed earlier than that.

The Master of the Rolls was initially a clerk responsible for keeping the "Rolls" or records of the Court of Chancery, and was known as the Keeper of the Rolls of Chancery. The Keeper was the most senior of the dozen Chancery clerks, and as such occasionally acted as keeper of the Great Seal of the Realm. The post evolved into a judicial one as the Court of Chancery did; the first reference to judicial duties dates from 1520. With the Judicature Act 1873, which merged the Court of Chancery with the other major courts, the Master of the Rolls joined the Chancery Division of the High Court and the Court of Appeal, but left the Chancery Division by the terms of the Judicature Act 1881. The Master of the Rolls had also been warden of the little-used Domus Conversorum for housing Jewish converts, which led to the house and chapel being used to store legal documents and later becoming the location of the Public Record Office. He retained his clerical functions as the nominal head of the Public Record Office until the Public Records Act 1958 transferred responsibility for it to the Lord Chancellor. One residual reminder of this role is the fact that the Master of the Rolls of the day continues to serve, ex officio, as President of the British Records Association. The Master of the Rolls was also previously responsible for registering solicitors, the officers of the Senior Courts.

One of the most prominent people to hold the position was Thomas Cromwell, a highly influential figure during the reign of Henry VIII; more recently, Lord Denning held the position for 20 years, from 1962 to 1982, and made sweeping changes in the common law. The current Master of the Rolls is Sir Colin Birss, who took office in November 2026.

== The Rolls Estate ==
The substantial estate of the Domus Conversorum, between London and Westminster, became attached to the office of Master of the Rolls, and was known as the "Rolls Estate", regarded as virtually an Inn of Court.

== List of Masters of the Rolls ==
=== Gallery ===
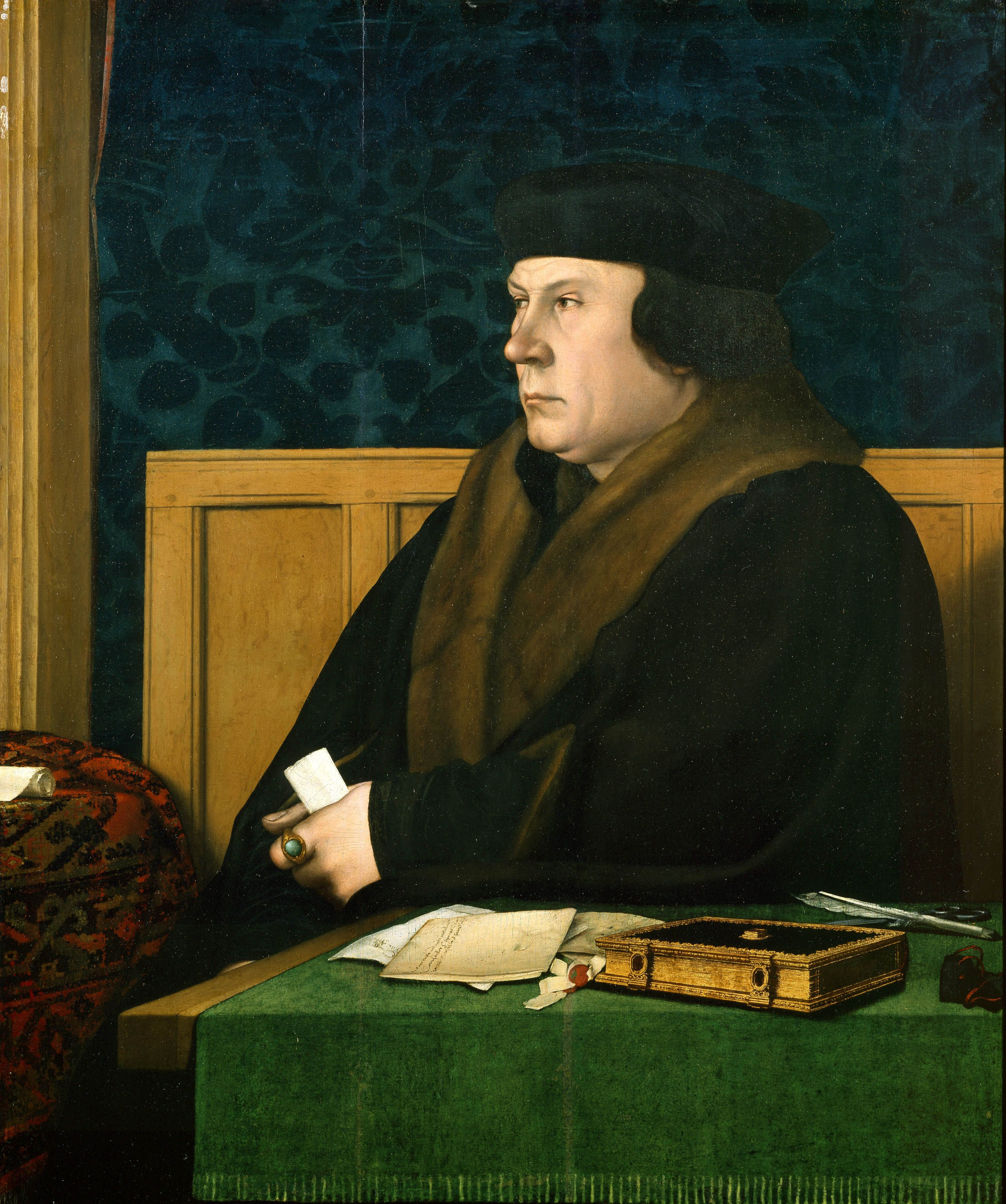
Thomas Cromwell, a highly influential figure during the reign of Henry VIII

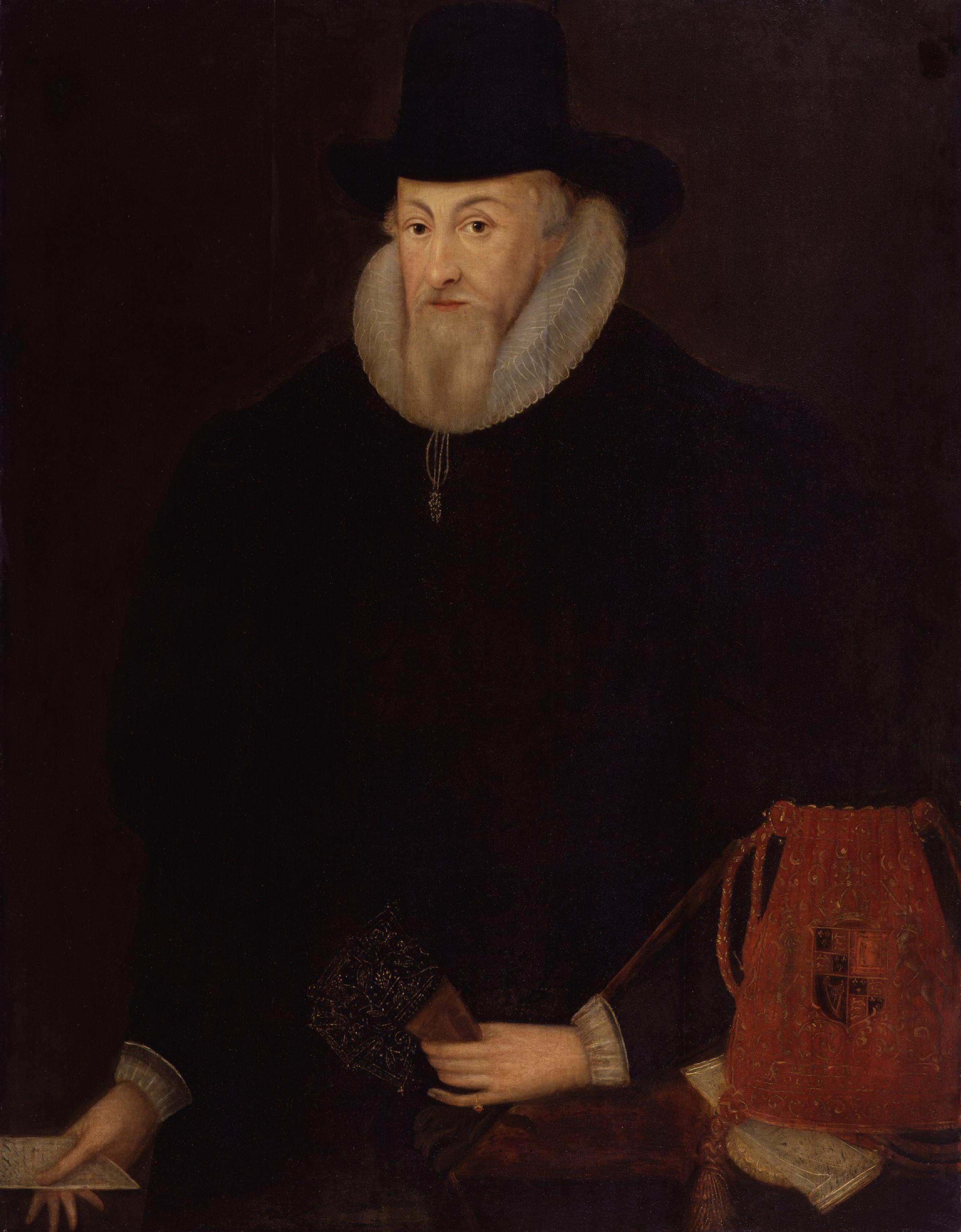
Sir Thomas Egerton, who served as Lord Keeper and Lord Chancellor for 21 years

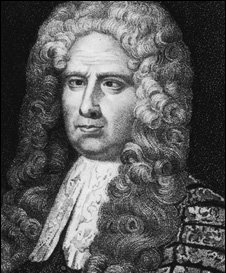
Sir John Trevor, the last Speaker of the House of Commons to resign in over 300 years until the resignation of Michael Martin in 2009

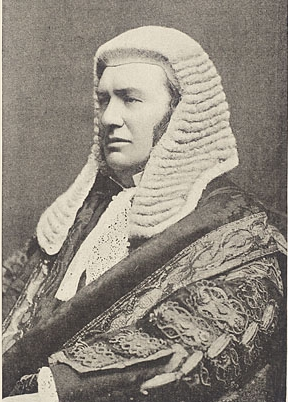
Sir Nathaniel Lindley, who made key judgments in a variety of important cases and was the last Serjeant-at-Law appointed, the last to sit as a judge and the last surviving.

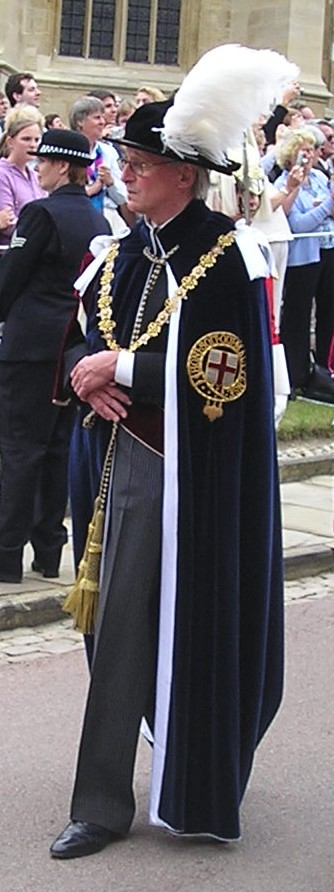
Tom Bingham, Baron Bingham of Cornhill, who helped establish the UK Supreme Court

Portrait	Name	Term of office		Other positions	Notes
	John Langton	2 September 1286	1 October 1295	Lord Chancellor 1292–1302, 1307–1310	
	Adam Osgodby	1 October 1295	19 August 1316	—	
	William Airmyn	19 August 1316	26 May 1324	—	
	Richard Airmyn	26 May 1324	4 July 1325	—	
	Henry de Cliff	4 July 1325	20 January 1334	—	
	Michael Wrath	20 January 1334	28 April 1337	—	
	John de St Paul	28 April 1337	10 January 1341	Archbishop of Dublin 1349–1362, Lord Chancellor of Ireland 1350–1356	
	Thomas Evesham	10 January 1341	21 February 1341	—	
	John Thoresby	21 February 1341	2 July 1346	—	
	David Wollore	2 July 1346	28 March 1371	—	
	William Burstall	28 March 1371	8 September 1381	—	
	John Waltham	8 September 1381	24 October 1386	Lord Privy Seal 1386–1389, Lord Chancellor 1349–1356	
	John Burton	24 October 1386	22 July 1394	—	
	John Scarle	22 July 1394	11 September 1397	Lord Chancellor 1399–1401	
	Thomas Stanley	11 September 1397	24 September 1402	—	
	Nicholas Bubwith	24 September 1402	2 March 1405	Lord Privy Seal 1405–1406, Lord High Treasurer 1407–1408	
	John Wakering	2 March 1405	3 June 1415	Lord Privy Seal 1415–1416	
	Simon Gauntsede	3 June 1415	28 October 1423	—	
	John Frank	28 October 1423	13 November 1438	—	
	John Stopyndon	13 November 1438	29 March 1447	—	
	John Kirkeby	29 March 1447	23 December 1461	—	
	Robert Kirkeham	23 December 1461	12 February 1471	—	
	William Morland	12 February 1471	29 April 1471	—	
	John Alcock	29 April 1471	16 March 1472	Lord Chancellor 1475, 1485–1487	
	John Morton	16 March 1472	9 January 1479	Lord Chancellor 1487–1500, Archbishop of Canterbury 1486–1500	
	Robert Morton	9 January 1479	22 September 1483	—	
	Thomas Barowe	22 September 1483	22 August 1485	—	
	Robert Morton jointly with William Eliot	22 August 1485	26 February 1487	Jointly from 13 November 1485	
	David William	26 February 1487	5 May 1492	—	
	John Blyth	5 May 1492	13 February 1494	—	
	William Warham	13 February 1494	1 February 1502	Keeper of the Great Seal 1502–1504, Lord Chancellor 1504–1515, Archbishop of Canterbury 1503–1532	
	William Barons	1 February 1502	13 November 1504	—	
	Christopher Bainbridge	13 November 1504	22 January 1508	Archbishop of York 1508–1514	
	John Yonge	22 January 1508	12 May 1516	—	
	Cuthbert Tunstall	12 May 1516	20 October 1522	Lord Privy Seal 1523–1530	
	John Clerk	20 October 1522	9 October 1523	—	
	Thomas Hannibal	9 October 1523	26 June 1527	—	
	John Taylor	26 June 1527	8 October 1534	Archdeacon of Derby 1516–1533, Archdeacon of Buckingham 1516–1534	
	Thomas Cromwell	8 October 1534	10 July 1536	Secretary of State 1533–1536, Lord Privy Seal 1536–1540	
	Christopher Hales	10 July 1536	1 July 1541	Solicitor General 1525–1529, Attorney General 1529–1536	
	Sir Robert Southwell	1 July 1541	13 December 1550	—	
	John Beaumont	13 December 1550	18 June 1552	—	
	Sir Robert Bowes	18 June 1552	18 September 1553	—	
	Sir Nicholas Hare	18 September 1553	5 November 1557	Speaker of the House of Commons 1539–1540	
	Sir William Cordell	5 November 1557	30 May 1581	Solicitor General 1553–1557, Speaker of the House of Commons 1558	
	Sir Gilbert Gerard	30 May 1581	10 April 1594	Attorney General 1559–1581	
	Sir Thomas Egerton	10 April 1594	18 May 1603	Solicitor General 1581–1592, Attorney General 1592–1594, Lord Chancellor 1596–1617, First Lord of the Treasury 1613–1614	
	Edward Bruce, 1st Lord Kinloss, 1st Lord Bruce	18 May 1603	14 January 1611	—	
	Sir Edward Phelips	14 January 1611	1 September 1614	Speaker of the House of Commons 1603–1611	
	Sir Julius Caesar	1 September 1614	18 April 1636	Chancellor of the Exchequer 1606–1614	
	Sir Dudley Digges	18 April 1636	30 March 1639	—	
	Sir Charles Caesar	30 March 1639	28 January 1643	—	
	The Lord Colepeper (royalist)	28 January 1643	3 November 1660	Chancellor of the Exchequer 1642–1643	
	William Lenthall (parliamentary)	10 November 1643	14 May 1659	Speaker of the House of Commons 1640–1647, 1647–1653, 1654–1655, 1659–1660	
	Sir Harbottle Grimston, Bt	3 November 1660	12 January 1685	Speaker of the House of Commons 1660	
	Sir John Churchill	12 January 1685	20 October 1685	Attorney-General 1673–85	
	Sir John Trevor	20 October 1685	13 March 1689	—	
	Sir Henry Powle	13 March 1689	13 January 1693	Speaker of the House of Commons 1689	
	Sir John Trevor	13 January 1693	20 May 1717	Speaker of the House of Commons 1685–1689, 1693–1717	
	Sir Joseph Jekyll	13 July 1717	19 August 1738	—	
	Sir John Verney	9 October 1738	5 August 1741	—	
	Sir William Fortescue	5 November 1741	16 December 1749	—	
	Sir John Strange	11 January 1750	18 May 1754	Solicitor General 1737–1742	
	Sir Thomas Clarke	29 May 1754	13 November 1764	—	
	Sir Thomas Sewell	4 December 1764	6 March 1784	—	
	Sir Lloyd Kenyon	30 March 1784	7 June 1788	Attorney General 1782–1783, 1783–1784, Lord Chief Justice 1788–1802	
	Sir Richard Arden	14 June 1788	23 May 1801	Solicitor General 1782–1783, 1783–1784, Attorney General 1784–1788, Chief Justice of the Common Pleas 1801–1804	
	Sir William Grant	27 May 1801	31 December 1817	Solicitor General 1799–1801	
	Sir Thomas Plumer	6 January 1818	24 March 1824	Solicitor General 1807–1812, Attorney General 1812–1813	
	The Lord Gifford	5 April 1824	4 September 1826	Solicitor General 1817–1819, Attorney General 1819–1824, Chief Justice of the Common Pleas 1824	
	Sir John Singleton Copley	14 September 1826	1 May 1827	Solicitor General 1819–1824, Attorney General 1824–1826, Lord Chancellor 1827–1830, 1834–1835, 1841–1846	
	Sir John Leach	3 May 1827	14 September 1834	Vice Chancellor of England 1818–1827	
	Sir Charles Pepys, Bt	29 September 1834	19 January 1836	Solicitor General 1834, Lord Chancellor 1836–1841, 1846–1850	
	The Lord Langdale	19 January 1836	28 March 1851	—	
	The Lord Romilly	28 March 1851	29 August 1873	Solicitor General 1848, Attorney General 1850	
	Sir George Jessel	30 August 1873	21 March 1883	Solicitor General 1871–1873	
	The Lord Esher	3 April 1883	18 October 1897	Solicitor General 1868	
	Sir Nathaniel Lindley	25 October 1897	10 May 1900	—	
	The Lord Alverstone	10 May 1900	22 October 1900	Lord Chief Justice 1900–1913	
	Sir Archibald Levin Smith	23 October 1900	19 October 1901	—	
	Sir Richard Collins	19 October 1901	6 March 1907	—	
	Sir Herbert Cozens-Hardy (The Lord Cozens-Hardy from 1914)	6 March 1907	30 April 1918	—	
	Sir Charles Swinfen Eady	2 May 1918	20 October 1919	—	
	The Lord Sterndale	31 October 1919	17 August 1923	President of the Probate, Divorce and Admiralty Division 1918–1919	
	Sir Ernest Pollock (The Lord Hanworth from 1926)	12 October 1923	7 October 1935	Solicitor General 1919–1922, Attorney General 1922.	
	The Lord Wright	7 October 1935	27 April 1937	—	
	The Lord Greene	27 April 1937	1 June 1949	—	
	Sir Raymond Evershed (The Lord Evershed from 1956)	1 June 1949	19 April 1962	—	
	The Lord Denning	19 April 1962	29 September 1982	—	
	Sir John Donaldson (The Lord Donaldson of Lymington from 1988)	30 September 1982	1 October 1992	—	
	Sir Thomas Bingham	1 October 1992	4 June 1996	Lord Chief Justice 1996–2000; Senior Lord of Appeal in Ordinary 2000–2008	
	The Lord Woolf	4 June 1996	6 June 2000	Lord Chief Justice 2000–2005	
	The Lord Phillips of Worth Matravers	6 June 2000	3 October 2005	Lord Chief Justice 2005–2008, President of the Supreme Court of the United Kingdom 2009–2012	
	Sir Anthony Clarke (The Lord Clarke of Stone-cum-Ebony from May 2009)	3 October 2005	30 September 2009	Justice of the Supreme Court of the United Kingdom, 2009–2017	
	The Lord Neuberger of Abbotsbury	1 October 2009	30 September 2012	President of the Supreme Court of the United Kingdom, 2012–2017	
	Lord Dyson	1 October 2012	2 October 2016	Justice of the Supreme Court of the United Kingdom, 2010–2012	
	Sir Terence Etherton (The Lord Etherton from December 2020)	3 October 2016	11 January 2021	Chancellor of the High Court, 2013–2016	
	Sir Geoffrey Vos	11 January 2021	30 October 2026	Chancellor of the High Court, 2016–2021	
	Sir Colin Birss	1 November 2026	Incumbent	Chancellor of the High Court 2025–2026, President of the Business and Property Division 2026	

== Peerages created for the Master of the Rolls ==
Since the Act of Union 1707
Master of the Rolls	Title	Created	Current status	Other Judicial Roles
Sir Lloyd Kenyon	Baron Kenyon	3 June 1788	Extinct 4 April 1802	Lord Chief Justice of the King's Bench
Sir Richard Arden	Baron Alvanley	22 May 1801	Extinct 24 June 1857	Lord Chief Justice of the Common Pleas
Sir Robert Gifford	Baron Gifford	30 January 1824	Extinct 4 September 1826	Lord Chief Justice of the Common Pleas
Sir John Copley	Baron Lyndhurst	25 April 1827	Extinct 12 October 1863	Lord High Chancellor of Great Britain
Sir John Copley	Baron Lyndhurst	25 April 1827	Extinct 12 October 1863	Lord Chief Baron of the Exchequer
Sir Charles Pepys	Earl of Cottenham	11 June 1850	Extinct 29 April 1851	Lord High Chancellor of Great Britain
Sir Charles Pepys	Baron Cottenham	20 January 1836		Lord High Chancellor of Great Britain
Sir Henry Bickersteth	Baron Langdale	23 January 1836	Extinct 18 April 1851	None
Sir John Romilly	Baron Romilly	3 January 1866	Extinct 29 June 1983	None
Sir William Brett	Viscount Esher	11 November 1897	Extinct 24 May 1899	None
Sir William Brett	Baron Esher	24 July 1895		None
Sir Nathaniel Lindley	Baron Lindley as Law Lord	10 May 1900	Extinct 9 December 1921	None
Sir Richard Webster	Viscount Alverstone	24 November 1913	Extinct 15 December 1915	Lord Chief Justice of England
Sir Richard Webster	Baron Alverstone	18 June 1900	Extinct 15 December 1915	Lord Chief Justice of England
Sir Richard Collins	Baron Collins as Law Lord	6 March 1907	Extinct 3 January 1911	None
Sir Herbert Cozens-Hardy	Baron Cozens-Hardy	1 July 1914	Extinct 11 September 1975	None
Sir Charles Swinfen Eady	Baron Swinfen	1 November 1919	Extinct 15 November 1919	None
Sir William Pickford	Baron Sterndale	14 November 1918	Extinct 17 August 1923	None
Sir Ernest Pollock	Viscount Hanworth	17 January 1936	Extinct 22 October 1936	None
Sir Ernest Pollock	Baron Hanworth	28 January 1926		None
Sir Robert Wright	Baron Wright as Law Lord	11 April 1932	Extinct 27 June 1964	None
Sir Wilfrid Greene	Baron Greene	16 July 1941	Extinct 16 April 1952	None
Sir Raymond Evershed	Baron Evershed	20 January 1956	Extinct 3 October 1966	None
Sir Tom Denning	Baron Denning as Law Lord	24 April 1957	Extinct 5 March 1999	None
Sir John Donaldson	Baron Donaldson of Lymington as Life Peer	15 February 1988	Extinct 31 August 2005	None
Sir Tom Bingham	Baron Bingham of Cornhill as Law Lord	4 June 1996	Extinct 11 September 2010	Lord Chief Justice of England and Wales
Sir Harry Woolf	Baron Woolf as Law Lord	1 October 1992	Extant	Lord Chief Justice of England and Wales
Sir Nick Phillips	Baron Phillips of Worth Matravers as Law Lord	12 January 1999	Extant	President of the Supreme Court of the United Kingdom
Sir Nick Phillips	Baron Phillips of Worth Matravers as Law Lord	12 January 1999	Extant	Lord Chief Justice of England and Wales
Sir Tony Clarke	Baron Clarke of Stone-cum-Ebony as Life Peer	29 May 2009	Extinct 16 April 2026	None
Sir David Neuberger	Baron Neuberger of Abbotsbury as Law Lord	11 January 2007	Extant	President of the Supreme Court of the United Kingdom
Sir Terence Etherton	Baron Etherton as Life Peer	23 December 2020	Extinct 6 May 2025	Chancellor of the High Court

== See also ==
- Category:Masters of the Rolls

== Bibliography ==
- Hanworth, Lord (1935). "Some Notes on the Office of Master of the Rolls". Cambridge Law Journal. 5 (3). Cambridge University Press: 313–331. doi:10.1017/S0008197300124675. ISSN 0008-1973. S2CID 144982031.
- Sainty, John (1993). The Judges of England 1272–1990: a list of judges of the superior courts. Oxford: Selden Society. OCLC 29670782.
