= John Langton (bishop of Chichester) =

14th-century Bishop of Chichester and Chancellor of England

- Bishop of Chichester
- Province: Canterbury
- Appointed: 5 April 1305
- Term ended: 19 July 1337
- Predecessor: Gilbert of St Leonard
- Successor: Robert Stratford
- Other post: Lord Chancellor
- Previous posts: Bishop-elect of Ely; Master of the Rolls

Orders
- Consecration: 19 September 1305

Personal details
- Died: 19 July 1337
- Denomination: Roman Catholic

Master of the Rolls
- In office 1286–1292
- Monarch: Edward I of England
- Preceded by: new office
- Succeeded by: Adam Osgodby

Lord Chancellor
- In office 1292–1302
- Monarch: Edward I of England
- Preceded by: Robert Burnell
- Succeeded by: William Greenfield

Lord Chancellor
- In office 1307–1310
- Monarch: Edward II of England
- Preceded by: Ralph Baldock
- Succeeded by: Walter Reynolds

John Langton (died 1337) was a chancellor of England and Bishop of Chichester.

== Life ==
Langton was a clerk in the royal chancery, serving as the first Master of the Rolls from May 1286, and became chancellor in 1292. He obtained several ecclesiastical appointments (including as Vicar of St. Mary's Church, Horncastle), but owing to the resistance of Pope Boniface VIII he failed to secure the bishopric of Ely in 1298, although he was supported by King Edward I of England and visited Rome to attain his end. Resigning his office as chancellor in 1302, he was chosen Bishop of Chichester on 5 April 1305, consecrated bishop on 19 September 1305, and again became chancellor shortly after the accession of Edward II in 1307. Langton was one of the ordainers elected in 1310, and it was probably his connection with this body that led to his losing the office of chancellor about this time. He continued, however, to take part in public affairs, mediating between the king and Thomas, 2nd Earl of Lancaster in 1318, and attempting to do so between Edward and his rebellious barons in 1321. He died on 19 July 1337. Langton built the chapterhouse at Chichester, and was a benefactor of the University of Oxford.

== Citations ==
Legal offices
New office	Master of the Rolls; 1286–1295	Succeeded by Adam Osgodby
Political offices
Preceded by Robert Burnell	Lord Chancellor; 1292–1302	Succeeded by William Greenfield
Preceded by Ralph Baldock	Lord Chancellor; 1307–1310	Succeeded by Walter Reynolds as Keeper of the Great Seal
Catholic Church titles
Preceded by William of Louth as consecrated bishop	— DISPUTED — Bishop-elect of Ely; 1298–1299; Disputed by John Salmon	Succeeded by Ralph Walpole as consecrated bishop
Preceded by Gilbert of St Leonard	Bishop of Chichester; 1305–1337	Succeeded by Robert Stratford
