= William Baldock (cricketer, born 1815) =

English cricketer

Personal information
- Full name: William Baldock
- Born: 1815; Bapchild, Kent, England
- Died: 23 June 1878 (aged 62/63); Surbiton, Surrey, England
- Batting: Unknown
- Relatives: William Baldock junior (son); William Baldock (grandson)

Career statistics
Competition	First-class
Matches	8
Runs scored	127
Batting average	10.58
100s/50s	–/–
Top score	28
Catches/stumpings	2/–
- Source: Cricinfo, 19 July 2020

William Baldock (1815 – 23 June 1878) was an English first-class cricketer.

The son of William Henry Baldock, was born in Kent at Bapchild and made his debut in first-class cricket for the Gentlemen of Kent against the Gentlemen of England at Lord's in 1842. He made a further seven appearances in the fixture between 1842–49, scoring 127 runs in his eight first-class matches for the Gentlemen of Kent, which he made at an average of 10.58 and with a high score of 28. In addition to playing first-class cricket, Baldock also served in the 35th (Royal Sussex) Regiment of Foot, having formerly served in the East Kent Yeomanry from 1840 as a cornet. Baldock died at Surbiton in June 1878, and was survived by his son, William junior, who played first-class cricket for Hampshire. His grandson, also called William, played first-class cricket for Somerset.
