= Hugh of Northwold =

Bishop of Ely (died 1254)

- Bishop of Ely
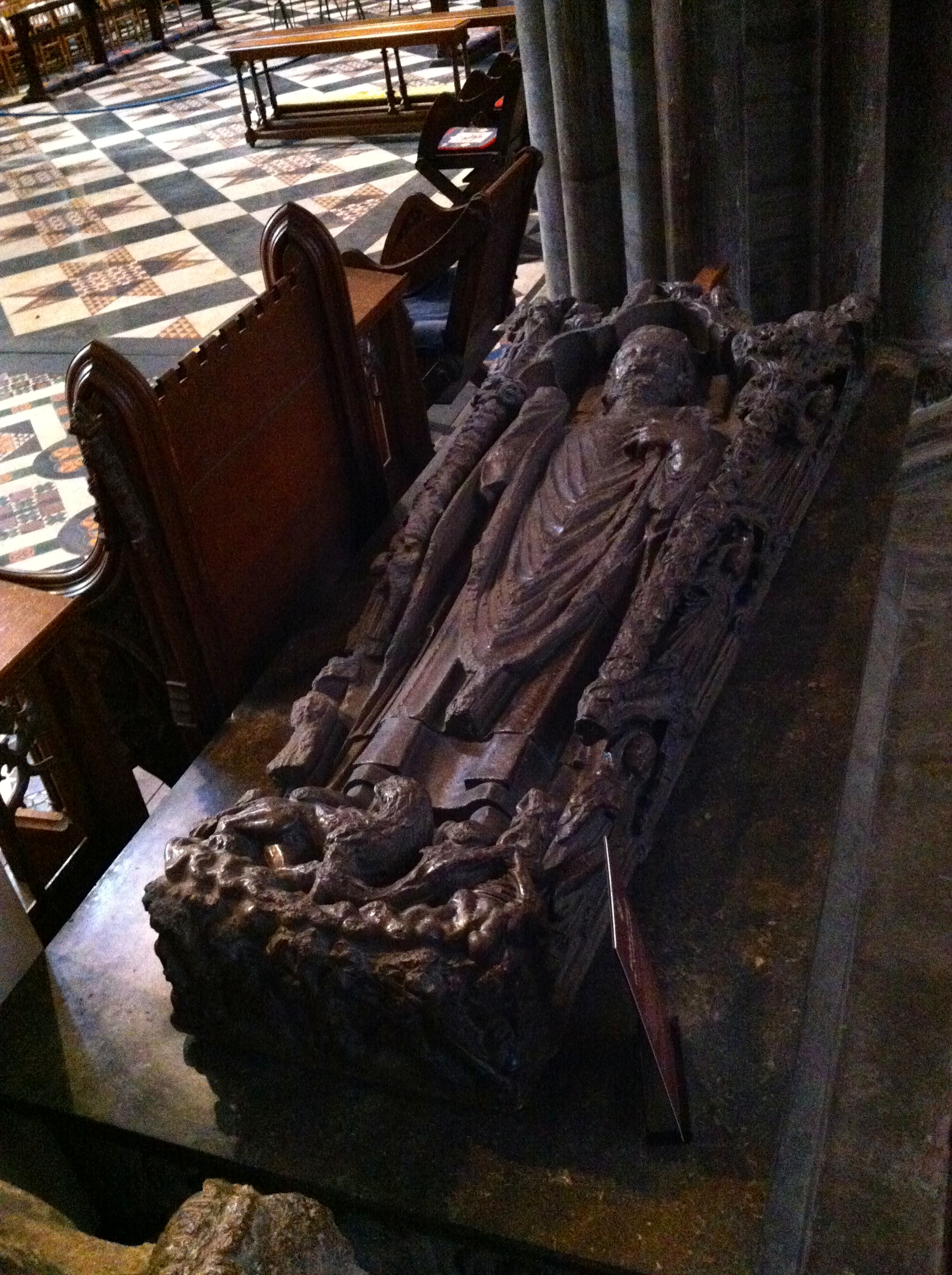
- Memorial to Bishop Hugh de Northwold in Ely Cathedral
- Elected: c. 3 February 1229
- Term ended: 6 August 1254
- Predecessor: Geoffrey de Burgo
- Successor: William of Kilkenny
- Other post: Abbot of Bury St Edmunds

Orders
- Consecration: 19 June 1229

Personal details
- Died: 6 August 1254 Downham Market
- Buried: Ely Cathedral
- Denomination: Catholic

Hugh of Northwold (died 1254) was a medieval Bishop of Ely.

== Life ==
Hugh was born in the parish of Northwold in Norfolk, the son of Peter and Emma. He became a monk at Abbey of Bury St Edmunds in 1202.

Hugh was elected Abbot of Bury St. Edmunds on 7 August 1213. King John of England, however, contested the election until 10 June 1215, when he finally accepted it.

Hugh was elected to the see of Ely about 3 February 1229. He was consecrated on 19 June 1229 at Canterbury. While bishop, he built extensively, was sent on diplomatic missions for King Henry III of England, and escorted Eleanor of Provence to England for her marriage to King Henry. He was also a good friend of Robert Grosseteste. His greatest work as bishop was his increase in the estates of the bishoprics, through buying new lands and increasing the rents on extant manors. He also worked with Thorney Abbey on reclamation of the fenlands surrounding Ely.

The presbytery of Ely Cathedral was built while Hugh was bishop. This was an example of Early English Gothic, and earned praise from the medieval chronicler Matthew Paris. However, much of the work done during Northwold's episcopate was later reworked during the 14th century, with the buttresses and some of the exterior and interior walls still remaining. The presbytery was built in order house a shrine to St. Etheldreda.

Hugh died on 6 August 1254 at Downham Market and was buried in his presbytery in Ely Cathedral. The tomb is still extant. He was buried at the feet of the shrine to Etheldreda, but whether he was buried where the tomb now stands is unclear. The tomb is now located near the high altar in the north choir aisle of Ely Cathedral.

== Citations ==
Catholic Church titles
Preceded by Geoffrey de Burgo	Bishop of Ely; 1229–1254	Succeeded by William of Kilkenny
