= Adam Osgodby =

English lawyer and administrator (died 1316)

Adam Osgodby (died 1316) was an English lawyer and administrator. He was born in Osgodby, North Riding of Yorkshire, and although his early life and career are fairly unknown it is known that he acted as a lawyer for William Hamilton among others. Between 1295 and 1316 he served as keeper of the rolls of chancery, and from 1307 he was the master of the Domus Conversorum. Osgodby also held several ecclesiastical positions—he was Canon of York from 1289, Parson of Gargrave from 1293 and Prebend of Ulfshelf. He died in 1316.

Legal offices
| Preceded by John Langton | Master of the Rolls; 1295–1316 | Succeeded by William Airmyn |
