= William of Louth =

13th-century Bishop of Ely

- Bishop of Ely
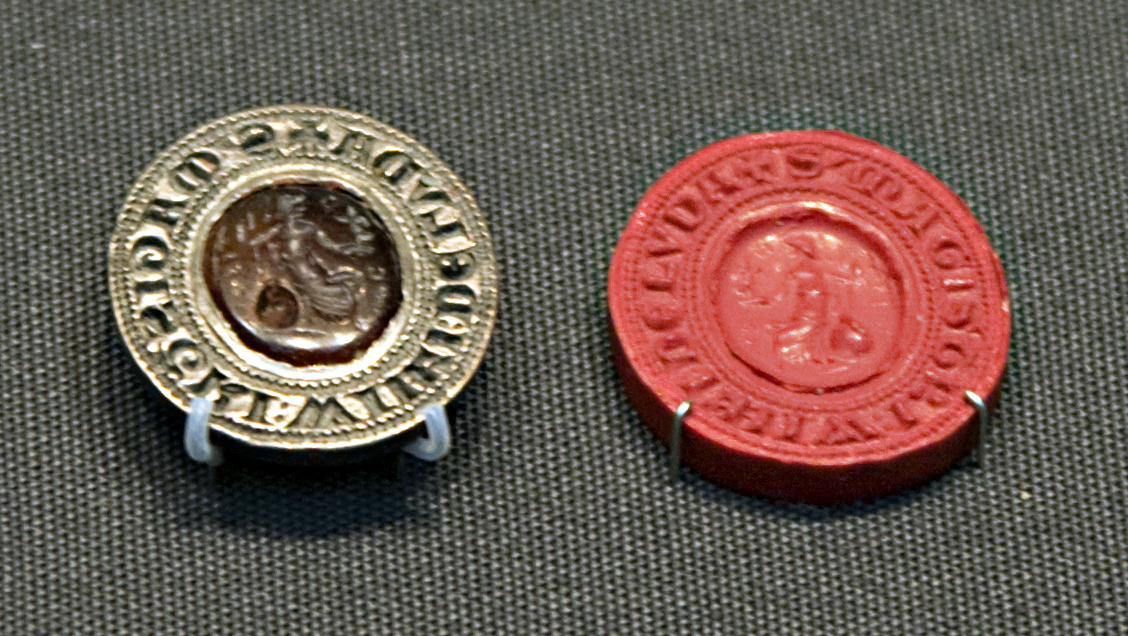
- William of Louth's seal, now in the British Museum
- Elected: 12 May 1290
- Term ended: 25 or 27 March 1298
- Predecessor: John Kirkby
- Successor: John Salmon
- Other post: Archdeacon of Durham

Orders
- Ordination: 23 September 1290
- Consecration: 1 October 1290 by Archbishop John Peckham, O.F.M. with co-consecrators Robert Burnell, John of Pontoise, Oliver Sutton, Ralph Walpole, William de La Corner, Peter Wyvill, and Anian Schonaw, O.P.

Personal details
- Died: 25 or 27 March 1298
- Buried: Ely Cathedral
- Denomination: Catholic

William of Louth, also known as William de Luda (died 1298) was a medieval Bishop of Ely.

== Life ==
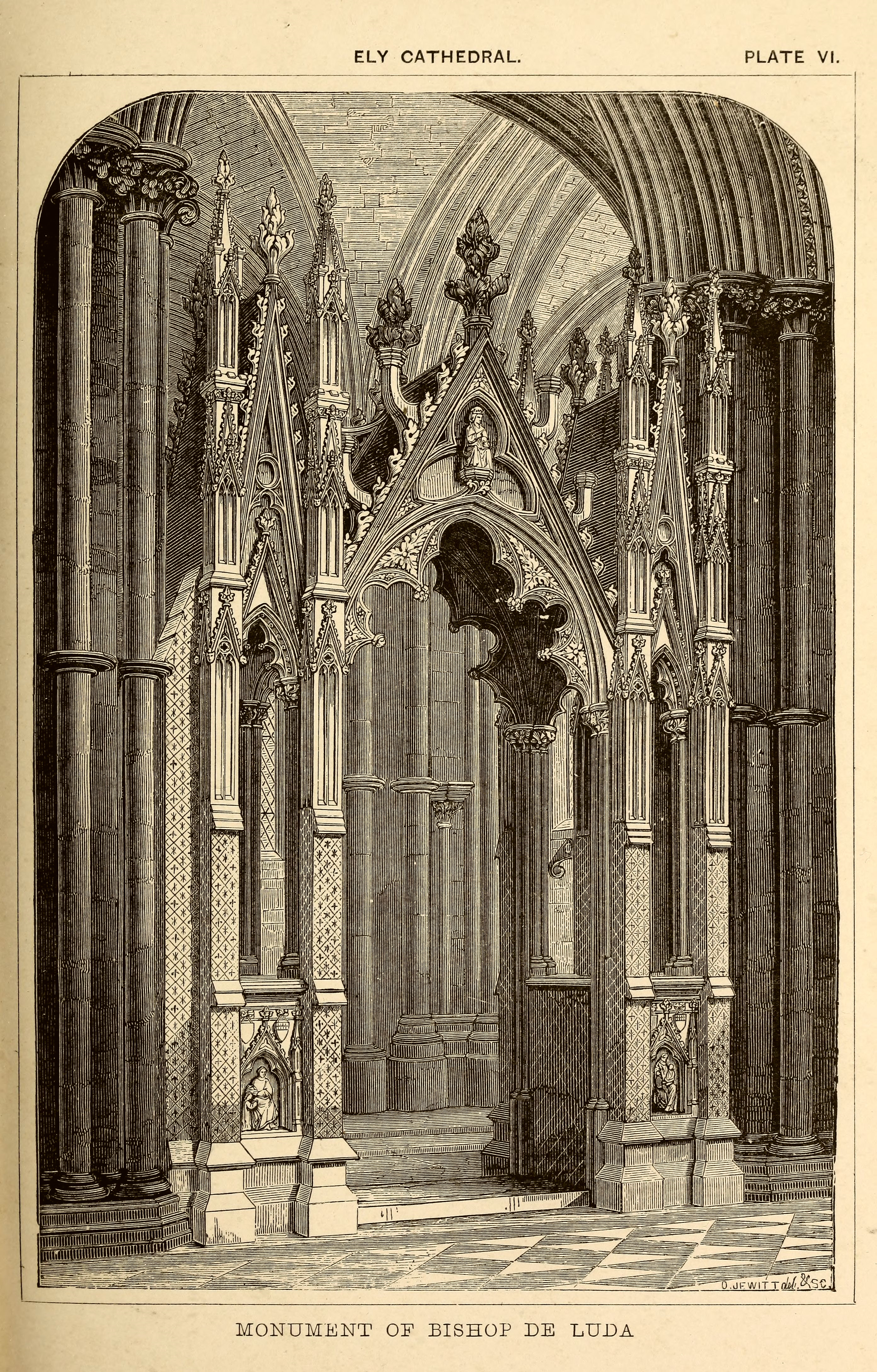
Monument to Bishop de Luda in Ely Cathedral

William probably was born in Louth, Lincolnshire but his parentage is unknown. William attended a university and held a university degree. He probably held an office in the chancery under King Henry III of England. Soon after the coronation of King Edward I of England, Edward appointed William cofferer of the wardrobe, on 18 October 1274. The cofferer was in charge of the money of that department of the administration. In 1278 through 1280, William was put in charge of the construction of the town and castle at Rhuddlan by the king.

William held prebends in the dioceses of Lincoln, London, Wells, and York as well as the deanery of St Martin le Grand in London before being named Archdeacon of Durham by 22 August 1284. In 1286 he was sent on a diplomatic mission to France by the king.

William was elected to the see of Ely on 12 May 1290 and consecrated on 1 October 1290. He died on 25 March 1298 or 27 March. He was buried in Ely Cathedral. His only known relative was a nephew William Tuchet, who was his heir. His tomb, with an elaborate canopy, still is located close to where it was originally placed near the high altar in the south choir aisle near the entrance to the Lady Chapel of Ely Cathedral.

== Citations ==
Catholic Church titles
Preceded by John Kirkby	Bishop of Ely; 1290–1298	Succeeded by John Salmon
