= John Kirkby (bishop of Ely) =

Bishop of Ely and Treasurer of England (died 1290)

- Bishop of Ely
- Elected: 26 July 1286
- Installed: 24 December 1286
- Predecessor: Hugh de Balsham
- Successor: William of Louth
- Other post: Archdeacon of Coventry

Orders
- Ordination: 22 September 1286
- Consecration: 22 September 1286 by John Peckham

Personal details
- Died: 26 March 1290 Ely
- Buried: Ely Cathedral
- Denomination: Catholic

Treasurer
- In office January 1284 – 26 March 1290
- Monarch: Edward I of England
- Preceded by: Richard Ware
- Succeeded by: William of March

John Kirkby (died 26 March 1290) was an English ecclesiastic and statesman.

== Life ==
Kirkby first appears in the historical record in the chancery during the reign of King Henry III of England. When Henry's son Edward I came to the throne, Kirkby was given the title vice-chancellor, because he often had custody of the Great Seal when the Chancellor, Robert Burnell, was absent from England. Often considered Burnell's protégé, Edward used Kirkby in 1282 as a collector of moneys for the king's Welsh campaigns. Edward rewarded him with a number of benefices, although Kirkby had not yet been ordained a priest. One such benefice was Archdeacon of Coventry.

Kirkby was Lord Treasurer from January 1284 to his death. Kirkby was probably behind the reforms that took place in the treasury and exchequer. Book-keeping methods were updated, information on sources of income improved, and efforts to collect debts to the crown intensified. Kirkby's Quest is the name given to a survey of various English counties which was made under Kirkby's direction in 1285 as part of this effort. The inquest investigated debts owed to the king, the status of vills, and the holding of knight's fees. Also in 1285, Edward I appointed Kirkby to oversee a judicial commission investigating disorder in London. Kirkby summoned the lord mayor and the aldermen of London to the Tower of London to appear before the commission. When the lord mayor of London resigned in protest at Kirkby's summons, Kirkby occupied the city and no lord mayor took office until 1298.

In 1283 Kirkby was elected Bishop of Rochester, but the Archbishop of Canterbury, John Peckham, opposed the appointment and Kirkby did not become bishop there. Peckham objected to his being bishop of Rochester because Kirkby was a pluralist. On 26 July 1286 he was elected Bishop of Ely, and was ordained as a priest and then consecrated on 22 September 1286 by Peckham, who did not object on pluralism grounds this time. He was enthroned at Ely Cathedral on 24 December 1286.

Kirkby died at Ely on 26 March 1290, after a botched attempt to bleed him. He was buried in Ely Cathedral. When he died, he left a brother Sir William (died without issue 1302) as his heir and four married sisters (Margarite, Alice, Mabell and Maud). Kirkby was a benefactor to his see, to which he left some property in London, including Ely Place. A marble tomb slab, now located in the north choir aisle, may possibly be from his tomb.

== Citations ==
Political offices
Preceded by Richard Ware	Lord Treasurer; 1284–1290	Succeeded by William of March
Catholic Church titles
Preceded by John Bradfield	Bishop of Rochester refused election 1283	Succeeded by Thomas Ingoldsthorpe
Preceded by Hugh de Balsham	Bishop of Ely; 1286–1290	Succeeded by William of Louth
