= John Hotham (bishop) =

Bishop, Chancellor and Treasurer of England (died 1337)

- Bishop of Ely
- Elected: about 20 June 1316
- Term ended: about 14 January 1337
- Predecessor: John Ketton
- Successor: Simon Montacute

Orders
- Consecration: 3 October 1316

Personal details
- Died: about 14 January 1337
- Buried: Ely Cathedral
- Denomination: Catholic

John Hotham (died 1337) was a medieval Chancellor of the Exchequer, Lord High Treasurer, Lord Chancellor and Bishop of Ely. He was also the effective Governor of Ireland for a time.

Hotham was the son of Alan and Matilda Hotham of Hotham and nephew of William Hotham, Archbishop of Dublin. His early career was spent in Ireland, where he became Chancellor of the Exchequer of Ireland until 1310. He was then appointed, on 13 December 1312, Chancellor of the Exchequer in England, a post he held until June 1316. Due to his knowledge of Irish affairs, he spent a good part of the Bruce Campaign in Ireland in that country, overseeing the Irish defences and exercising temporary powers of government. His firm action is generally credited with helping to bring about the defeat of the Scots invasion.

Hotham was elected to Ely on about 20 June 1316 and consecrated on 3 October 1316. Later that year he went to meet the pope in Avignon with the earl of Pembroke, partly to plead the case for the promotion of Alexander Bicknor as Archbishop of Dublin. After returning from Avignon, he was appointed Lord High Treasurer of England on 27 May 1317 but left that office in June 1318. when he was promoted as Lord Chancellor of England on 11 June 1318, an office he held until 26 January 1320.

Although close to King Edward II, Hotham switched allegiance to Queen Isabella when she successfully invaded to depose the king in September 1326. He was consequently appointed chancellor for the second time by her on behalf of the young King Edward III on 28 January 1327. He retired from government in 1328.

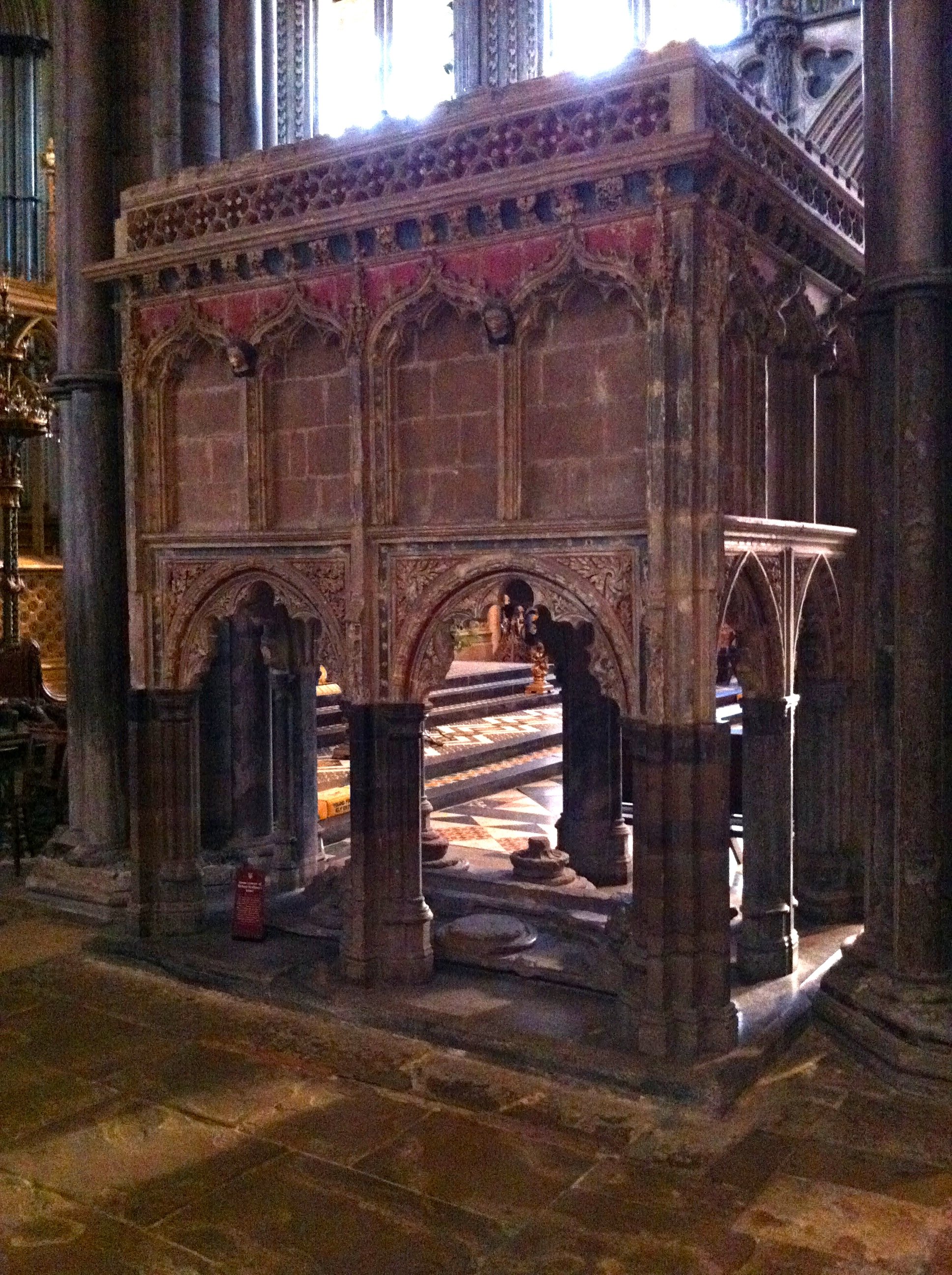
Memorial to Bishop Hotham in Ely Cathedral

Hotham died about 14 January 1337 after two years of paralysis and was buried in Ely Cathedral.

== Citations ==
Political offices
Preceded by Walter Norwich	Lord High Treasurer; 1317–1318	Succeeded by John Walwayn
Preceded by John Sandale	Lord Chancellor; 1318–1320	Succeeded by John Salmon
Preceded by Robert Baldock	Lord Chancellor; 1327–1328	Succeeded by Henry Burghersh
Catholic Church titles
Preceded by John Ketton	Bishop of Ely; 1316–1337	Succeeded by Simon Montacute
