= Ralph Baldock =

14th-century Bishop of London and Chancellor of England

- Bishop of London
- Elected: 24 February 1304
- Term ended: 24 July 1313
- Predecessor: Richard Gravesend
- Successor: Gilbert Segrave

Orders
- Consecration: 30 January 1306

Personal details
- Died: 24 July 1313
- Denomination: Catholic

Ralph Baldock (or Ralph de Baldoc) was a medieval Bishop of London.

Baldock was elected on 24 February 1304, confirmed 10 May, and consecrated on 30 January 1306.

Baldock served as Lord Chancellor of England from 21 April 1307 to 2 August 1307. He licensed Bow Church on 17 November 1311 as a chapel of ease. He died on 24 July 1313.

== See also ==
- List of lord chancellors and lord keepers

== Citations ==
Political offices
Preceded by William Hamilton	Lord Chancellor; 1307	Succeeded by John Langton
Catholic Church titles
Preceded by Richard Gravesend	Bishop of London; 1304–1313	Succeeded by Gilbert Segrave
