= Robert Baldock =

14th-century Bishop of Norwich-elect and Chancellor of England

Robert Baldock D.C.L.

Lord Chancellor of England
- In office 1323–1326
- Monarch: Edward II
- Preceded by: John Salmon
- Succeeded by: John Hotham

Lord Privy Seal of England
- In office 1320–1323
- Monarch: Edward II
- Preceded by: Thomas Charlton
- Succeeded by: Robert Wodehouse

Archdeacon of Middlesex
- In office 1315–1326
- Monarch: Edward II
- Preceded by: Richard Newport
- Succeeded by: Roger de Hales

Personal details
- Died: 28 May 1327 Newgate Prison

Robert Baldock (or de Baldock; died 28 May 1327) was the Lord Privy Seal and Lord Chancellor of England, during the reign of King Edward II of England.

== Career ==
Baldock was archdeacon of Middlesex when he was named Controller of the Wardrobe and Lord Privy Seal on 27 January 1320 and then Prebend of Aylesbury in August 1320. He remained Lord Privy Seal until 8 July 1323, before being named Lord Chancellor of England on 20 August 1323.

Baldock was elected Bishop of Norwich on 23 July 1325, but before consecration resigned the office on 3 September 1325 to avoid a collision between the pope and the King.

In October 1326, Baldock was one of the small number of supporters who fled the London Uprising with King Edward when Queen Isabella and Roger Mortimer invaded. He remained with the King and the Despensers, the King's particular favorites, in their flight across England to the Despensers' lands in Wales, and was one of the last handful who attempted to cross to Ireland and failed. He and the King remained fugitives until their hiding place was revealed. Baldock lost his offices and was imprisoned in November 1326.

== Death ==
Unlike the Despensers, who suffered quick trials and executions, Baldock was a clergyman, and so in February 1327 was sent to London for trial by fellow clergy. He was placed under house arrest at Hereford Palace (the Bishop of Hereford's London residence). A mob broke into the house, severely beat him, and threw him into Newgate Prison, where he was murdered by some of the inmates.

== Citations ==
Political offices
Preceded by Thomas Charlton	Lord Privy Seal of England; 1320–1323	Succeeded by Robert Wodehouse
Preceded by John Salmon	Lord Chancellor of England; 1323–1326	Succeeded by John Hotham
Religious titles
Preceded by Richard Newport	Archdeacon of Middlesex; 1315–1326	Succeeded by Roger de Hales
Preceded by John Salmon as Bishop of Norwich	Bishop-elect of Norwich; 1325	Succeeded by William Ayermin as Bishop of Norwich
