= John Salmon (bishop) =

13th and 14th-century Bishop of Ely-elect, Bishop of Norwich, and Chancellor of England

- Bishop of Norwich
- Province: Canterbury
- Appointed: June 1298
- Term ended: 6 July 1325
- Predecessor: Ralph Walpole
- Successor: Robert Baldock
- Other post: Lord Chancellor
- Previous post: Bishop-elect of Ely

Orders
- Consecration: 15 November 1299

Personal details
- Died: 6 July 1325 Folkestone
- Buried: Norwich Cathedral
- Denomination: Roman Catholic Church
- Parents: Salomon & Alice

John Salmon (died 1325) was a medieval Bishop of Norwich.

== Life ==
Salmon's family was hereditary goldsmiths to the diocese of Ely. His parents were Salomon and Alice, and he was the eldest of three brothers. He entered the Benedictine priory of Ely sometime before 1291. He was subprior of Ely Cathedral before his election to be Prior of Ely in 1292.

Salmon was elected to the see of Ely in 1298 but King Edward I of England objected, wanting the monks to elect his chancellor John Langton instead. Each side appealed to Rome, and both elections were quashed by Pope Boniface VIII on 5 June 1299. As a consolation, he was provided to the see of Norwich between 5 and 18 June 1299 as he was still prior on 5 June. He was consecrated on 15 November 1299.

In 1307 Salmon helped arrange the marriage of the new king, Edward II, and in 1309 he was sent by the king to Rome to obtain the return from exile of Piers Gaveston. On 20 March 1311 he was elected one of the Lords Ordainers to help King Edward II govern. Over the next few years he was often in the king's service, being sent on diplomatic missions and negotiating with the earl of Lancaster for the king.

Salmon occupied the office of Lord Chancellor of England from 1320 to 1323. He accompanied the king on his travels, and helped negotiate with France and Scotland. He resigned the office in 1323 due to ill health, but continued to work on the king's behalf.

Salmon died on 6 July 1325 at Folkestone while returning from a diplomatic mission in France. He was buried in Norwich Cathedral.

== Citations ==
Political offices
Preceded by John Hotham	Lord Chancellor; 1320–1323	Succeeded by Robert Baldock
Catholic Church titles
Preceded by William of Louth as consecrated bishop	— DISPUTED — Bishop-elect of Ely; 1298–1299; Disputed by John Langton	Succeeded by Ralph Walpole as consecrated bishop
Preceded by Ralph Walpole	Bishop of Norwich; 1299–1325	Succeeded by Robert Baldock
