= William Baldock (Hampshire cricketer) =

English cricketer

Personal information
- Full name: William Stanford Baldock
- Born: 20 January 1847; Chilworth, Hampshire, England
- Died: 30 August 1923 (aged 76); Wellington, Somerset, England
- Batting: Right-handed
- Relatives: William Baldock senior (father); William Baldock junior (son)

Domestic team information
- Years: Team
- 1877–1882: Hampshire

Career statistics
Competition	First-class
Matches	7
Runs scored	155
Batting average	12.91
100s/50s	–/–
Top score	40
Balls bowled	108
Wickets	2
Bowling average	24.00
5 wickets in innings	–
10 wickets in match	–
Best bowling	1/10
Catches/stumpings	4/–
- Source: Cricinfo, 2 March 2010

William Stanford Baldock JP (20 January 1847 – 30 August 1923) was an English first-class cricketer and British Army officer.

The son of the cricketer William Baldock senior, he was born in January 1847 at Chilworth, Hampshire. He was educated at Winchester College, before attending the Royal Military Academy, Woolwich. He graduated from there into the Royal Artillery (RA) as a lieutenant in January 1868. Baldock made his debut in first-class cricket for Hampshire against Derbyshire at Southampton in 1877, with him making a further two appearances in that season, followed up by two more appearances in 1878. In the RA, he was promoted to captain in July 1879. He would make two further appearances in first-class cricket for Hampshire, in 1880 against Sussex and 1882 against the Marylebone Cricket Club. In his seven matches for Hampshire, Baldock scored 155 runs at an average of 12.91, with a highest score of 41. He was promoted to major in the RA in January 1885, before being promoted to lieutenant colonel in January 1892. Shortly thereafter, he retired from active service.

In later life, Baldock was a justice of the peace for Somerset. He died on 30 August 1923 at his residence in Wellington, Somerset. He was married in 1898 to Mary Elworthy, daughter of Frederick Thomas Elworthy, with their son William Baldock junior playing first-class cricket for Somerset. There were two other sons, Frank and Thomas Arthur.
