= William Baldock (Somerset cricketer) =

English cricketer

Personal information
- Full name: William Frederick Baldock
- Born: 1 August 1900; Wellington, Somerset, England
- Died: 30 December 1941 (aged 41); Terengganu, British Malaya
- Batting: Right-handed

Domestic team information
- Years: Team
- 1920–1936: Somerset
- First-class debut: 2 June 1920 Somerset v Oxford University
- Last First-class: 1 July 1936 Somerset v Surrey

Career statistics
Competition	First-class
Matches	10
Runs scored	238
Batting average	17.00
100s/50s	0/1
Top score	63*
Catches/stumpings	2/–
- Source: CricketArchive, 20 December 2009

William Frederick Baldock (1 August 1900 – 30 December 1941) was an English cricketer who played ten first-class matches for Somerset County Cricket Club from 1920 to 1936. A right-handed batsman, his top-score for Somerset was 63 not out, made against the Indians in 1936.

William Baldock was the son of Colonel William Stanford Baldock and Mary. Baldock was working in Malaya as a Conservator of Forests and was serving as a Private with the 2nd (Selangor) Battalion, Federated Malay States Volunteer Force when he died on 30 December 1941, aged 41.
