= Ely Cathedral =

Anglican cathedral in Ely, Cambridgeshire, England

- Cathedral Church of the Holy and Undivided Trinity of Ely
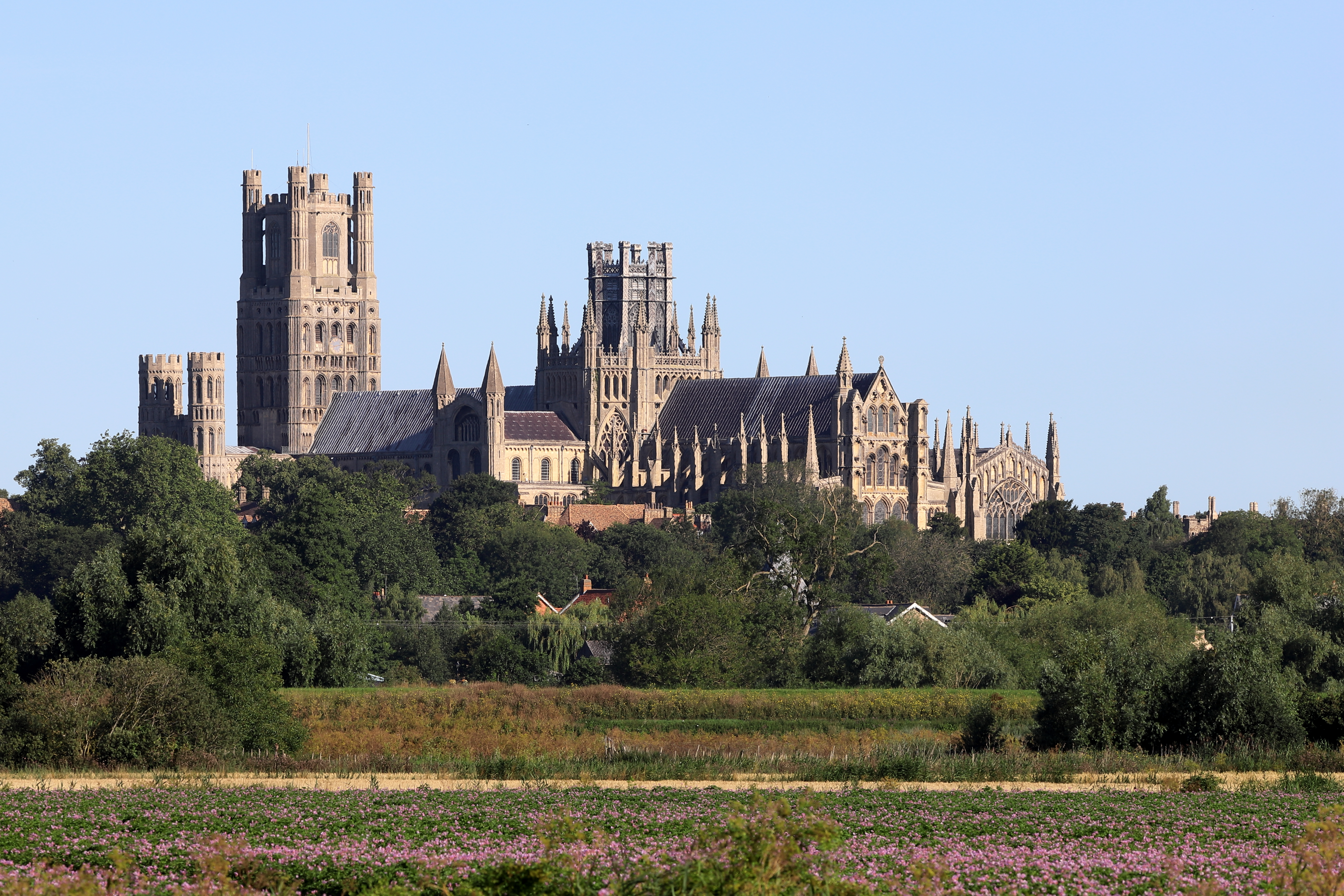
- Ely Cathedral from the southeast

- Location of Ely Cathedral in Cambridgeshire
- 52°23′55″N 0°15′50″E
- OS grid reference: TL 54046 80281
- Location: Ely, Cambridgeshire
- Country: England
- Denomination: Church of England
- Previous denomination: Roman Catholic
- Tradition: Broad church
- Website: www.elycathedral.org

History
- Dedication: Holy Trinity

Architecture
- Style: Romanesque, English Gothic
- Years built: 1083–1375

Specifications
- Length: 163.7 m (537 ft)
- Height: 66 m (217 ft)

Administration
- Province: Canterbury
- Diocese: Ely

Clergy
- Bishop(s): Sarah Clark; Dagmar Winter (Suffragan Bishop)
- Dean: Mark Bonney

Ely Cathedral, formally the Cathedral Church of the Holy and Undivided Trinity of Ely, is an Anglican cathedral in the city of Ely, Cambridgeshire, England.

The cathedral can trace its origin to the abbey founded in Ely in 672 by St Æthelthryth (also called Etheldreda). The earliest parts of the present building date to 1083, and it was granted cathedral status in 1109. Until the Reformation, the cathedral was dedicated to St Etheldreda and St Peter, at which point it was refounded as the Cathedral Church of the Holy and Undivided Trinity of Ely. It is the cathedral of the Diocese of Ely, which covers most of Cambridgeshire and western Norfolk, and Huntingdonshire. It is the seat of the Bishop of Ely and a suffragan bishop, the Bishop of Huntingdon.

Architecturally, Ely Cathedral is outstanding both for its scale and stylistic details. Having been built in a monumental Romanesque style, the galilee porch, lady chapel and choir were rebuilt in an exuberant Decorated Gothic. Its most notable feature is the central octagonal tower, with lantern above, which provides a unique internal space and, along with the West Tower, dominates the surrounding landscape.

The cathedral is a major tourist destination, receiving around 250,000 visitors per year, and sustains a daily pattern of morning and evening services.

== Anglo-Saxon abbey ==
Ely Abbey was founded in 672, by Æthelthryth (St Etheldreda also known as St Audrey), a daughter of Anna, King of East Anglia. It was a mixed community of men and women. Later accounts suggest her three successor abbesses were also members of the East Anglian Royal family. In later centuries, the depredations of Viking raids may have resulted in its destruction, or at least the loss of all records. It is possible that some monks provided a continuity through to its refoundation in 970, under the Rule of St Benedict. The precise siting of Æthelthryth's original monastery is not known. The presence of her relics, bolstered by the growing body of literature on her life and miracles, was a major driving force in the success of the refounded abbey. The church building of 970 was within or near the nave of the present building, and was progressively demolished from 1102 alongside the construction of the Norman church. The obscure Ermenilda of Ely also became an abbess sometime after her husband, Wulfhere of Mercia, died in 675.

== Present-day church ==
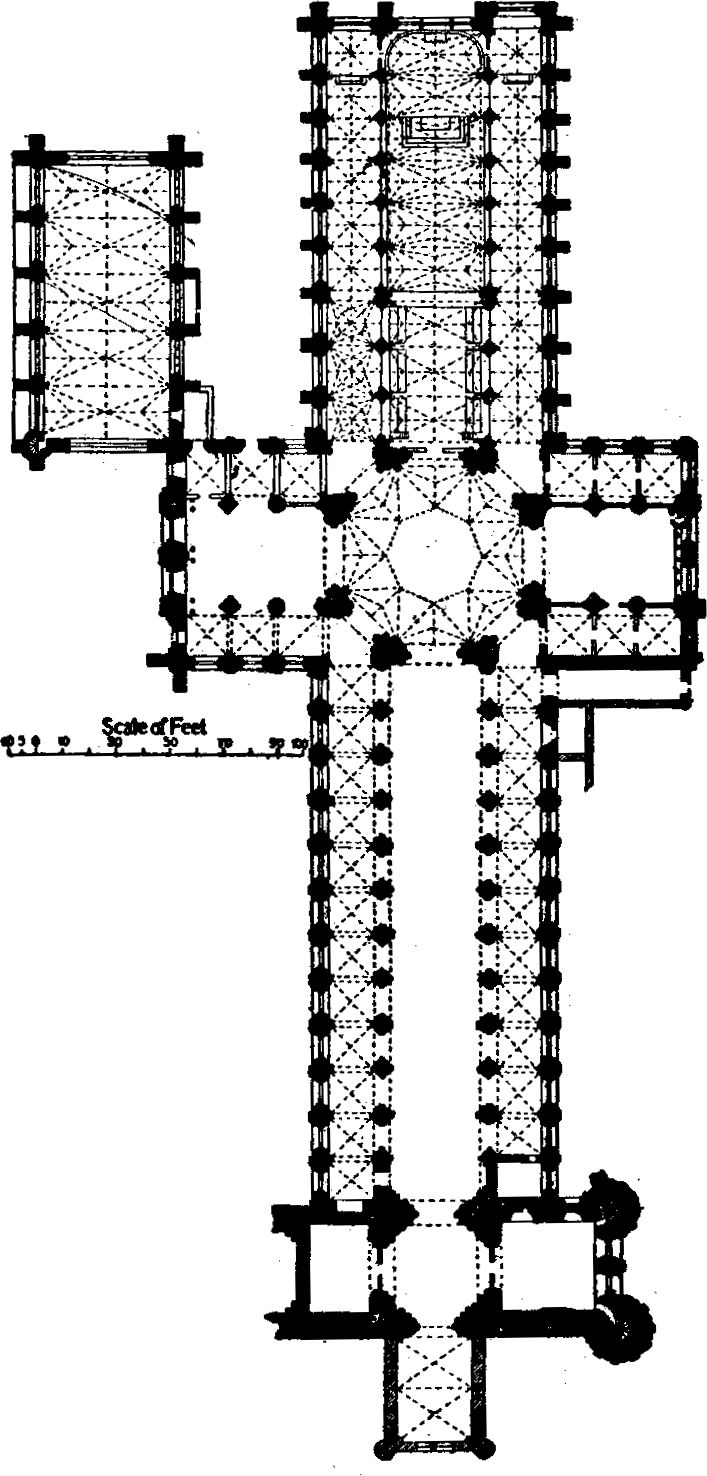
Ground plan following G.G. Scott's works of 1848, the last major internal re-ordering.

The cathedral is built from stone quarried from Barnack in Northamptonshire (bought from Peterborough Abbey, whose lands included the quarries, for 8,000 eels a year), with decorative elements carved from Purbeck Marble and local clunch. The plan of the building is cruciform (cross-shaped), with an additional transept at the western end. The total length is 164 metres (537 ft), and the nave at over 75 m (246 ft) long remains one of the longest in Britain. The west tower is 66 m (217 ft) high. The unique Octagon 'Lantern Tower' is 23 m (75 ft) wide and is 52 m (171 ft) high. Internally, from the floor to the central roof boss the lantern is 43 m (141 ft) high. The cathedral is known locally as "the ship of the Fens", because of its prominent position above the surrounding flat landscape.

=== Norman abbey church ===
Having a pre-Norman history spanning 400 years and a re-foundation in 970, Ely over the course of the next hundred years had become one of England's most successful Benedictine abbeys, with a famous saint, treasures, library, book production of the highest order and lands exceeded only by Glastonbury. However the imposition of Norman rule was particularly problematic at Ely. Newly arrived Normans such as Picot of Cambridge were taking possession of abbey lands, there was appropriation of daughter monasteries such as Eynesbury by French monks, and interference by the Bishop of Lincoln was undermining its status. All this was exacerbated when, in 1071, Ely became a focus of English resistance, through such people as Hereward the Wake, culminating in the Siege of Ely, for which the abbey suffered substantial fines.

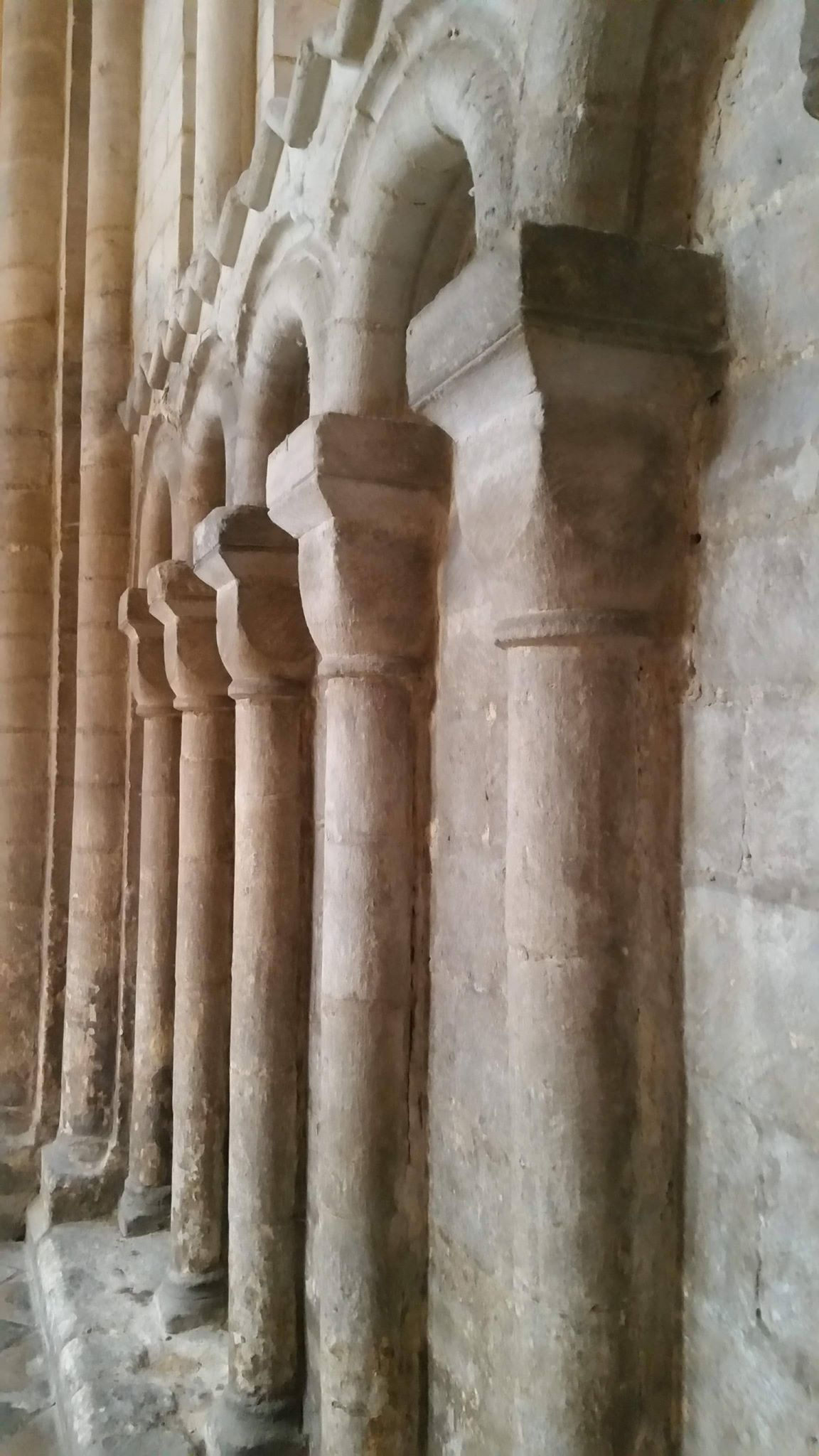
Norman Arcade in the nave

Under the Normans almost every English cathedral and major abbey was rebuilt from the 1070s onwards. If Ely was to maintain its status then it had to initiate its own building work, and the task fell to Abbot Simeon. He was the brother of Walkelin, the then Bishop of Winchester, and had himself been the prior at Winchester Cathedral when the rebuilding began there in 1079. In 1083, a year after Simeon's appointment as abbot of Ely, and when he was 90 years old, building work began. The years since the conquest had been turbulent for the Abbey, but the unlikely person of an aged Norman outsider effectively took sides with the Ely monks, reversed the decline in the abbey's fortunes, and found the resources, administrative capacity, identity and purpose to begin a mighty new building.

The design had many similarities to Winchester, a cruciform plan with central crossing tower, aisled transepts, a three-storey elevation and a semi-circular apse at the east end. It was one of the largest buildings under construction north of the Alps at the time. The first phase of construction took in the eastern arm of the church, and the north and south transepts. However, a significant break in the way the masonry is laid indicates that, with the transepts still unfinished, there was an unplanned halt to construction that lasted several years. It would appear that when Abbott Simeon died in 1093, an extended interregnum caused all work to cease. The administration of Ranulf Flambard may have been to blame. He illegally kept various posts unfilled, including that of Abbot of Ely, so he could appropriate the income. In 1099 he got himself appointed Bishop of Durham, in 1100 Abbot Richard was appointed to Ely and building work resumed. It is Abbot Richard who asserted Ely's independence from the Diocese of Lincoln, and pressed for it to be made a diocese in its own right, with the abbey church as its cathedral. Although Abbot Richard died in 1107, his successor Hervey le Breton was able to achieve this and become the first Bishop of Ely in 1109. This period at the start of the twelfth century was when Ely re-affirmed its link with its Anglo-Saxon past. The struggle for independence coincided with the period when resumption of building work required the removal of the shrines from the old building and the translation of the relics into the new church. This appears to have allowed, in the midst of a Norman-French hierarchy, an unexpectedly enthusiastic development of the cult of these pre-Norman saints and benefactors.

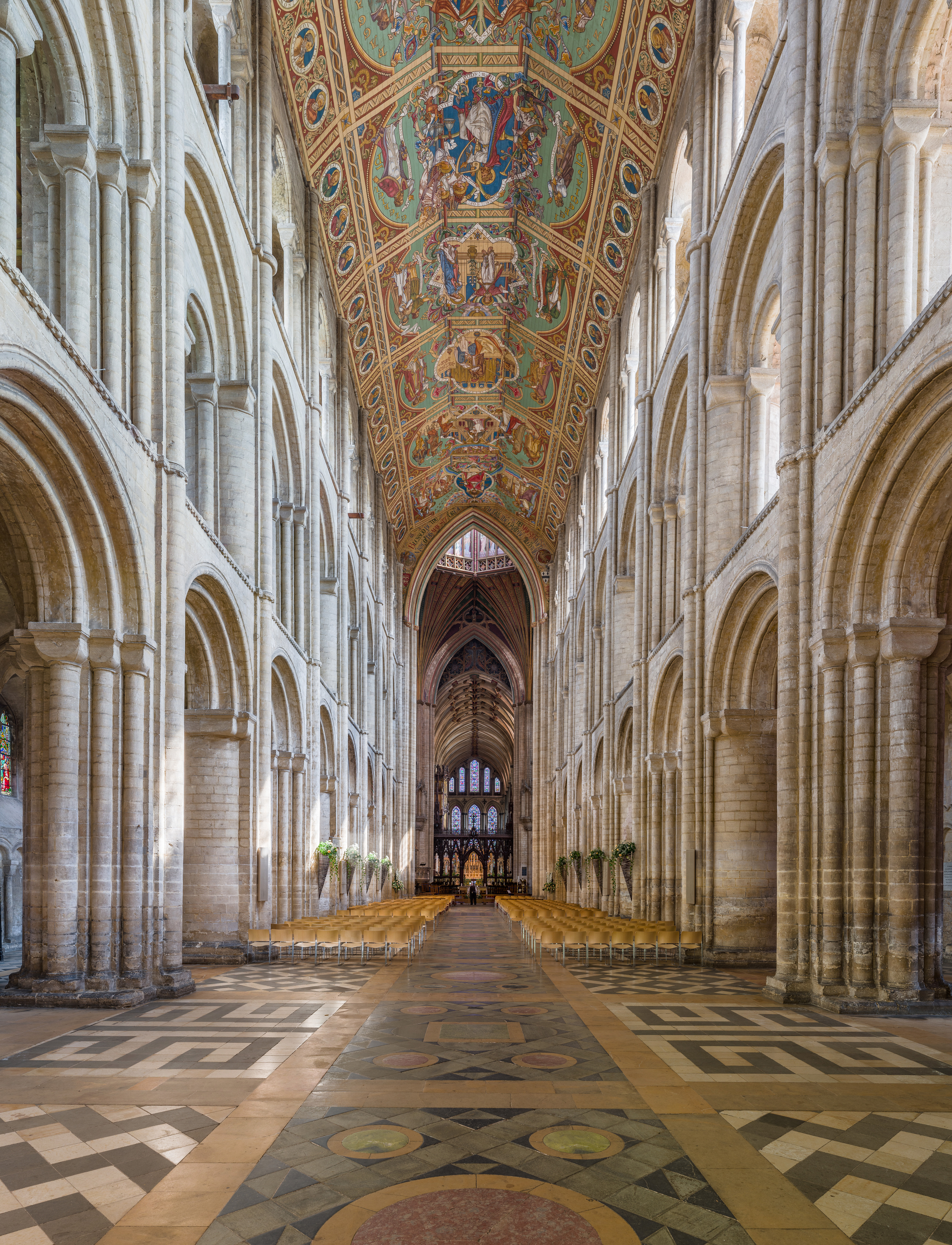
The nave with its painted ceiling

The Norman east end and the whole of the central area of the crossing are now entirely gone, but the architecture of the transepts survives in a virtually complete state, to give a good impression of how it would have looked. Massive walls pierced by Romanesque arches would have formed aisles running around all sides of the choir and transepts. Three tiers of archways rise from the arcaded aisles. Galleries with walkways could be used for liturgical processions, and above that is the Clerestory with a passage within the width of the wall.

Construction of the nave was underway from around 1115, and roof timbers dating to 1120 suggest that at least the eastern portion of the nave roof was in place by then. The great length of the nave required that it was tackled in phases and after completing four bays, sufficient to securely buttress the crossing tower and transepts, there was a planned pause in construction. By 1140 the nave had been completed together with the western transepts and west tower up to triforium level, in the fairly plain early Romanesque style of the earlier work. Another pause now occurred, for over 30 years, and when it resumed, the new mason found ways to integrate the earlier architectural elements with the new ideas and richer decorations of early Gothic.

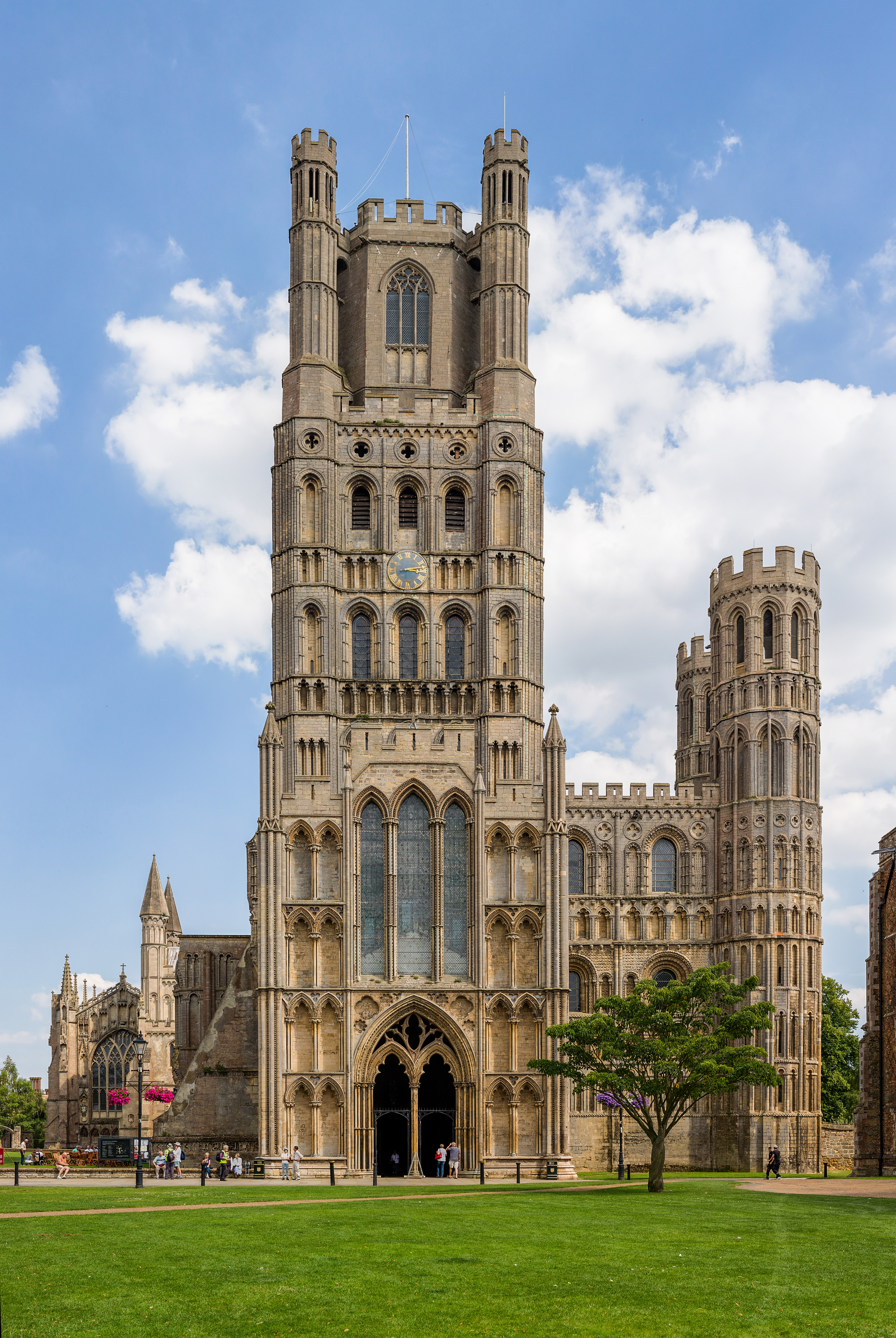
The west front and Galilee Porch

=== The West Tower ===
The half-built west tower and upper parts of the two western transepts were completed under Bishop Geoffrey Ridel (1174–89), to create an exuberant west front, richly decorated with intersecting arches and complex mouldings. The new architectural details were used systematically to the higher storeys of the tower and transepts. Rows of trefoil heads and use of pointed instead of semicircular arches, results in a west front with a high level of orderly uniformity.

Originally the west front had transepts running symmetrically either side of the west tower. Stonework details on the tower show that an octagonal tower was part of the original design, although the current western octagonal tower was installed in 1400. Numerous attempts were made, during all phases of its construction to correct problems from subsidence in areas of soft ground at the western end of the cathedral. In 1405–1407, to cope with the extra weight from the octagonal tower, four new arches were added at the west crossing to strengthen the tower. The extra weight of these works may have added to the problem, as at the end of the fifteenth century the north-west transept collapsed. A great sloping mass of masonry was built to buttress the remaining walls, which remain in their broken-off state on the north side of the tower.

=== Galilee Porch ===
The Galilee Porch is now the principal entrance into the cathedral for visitors. Its original liturgical functions are unclear, but its location at the west end meant it may have been used as a chapel for penitents, a place where liturgical processions could gather, or somewhere the monks could hold business meetings with women, who were not permitted into the abbey. It also has a structural role in buttressing the west tower. The walls stretch over two storeys, but the upper storey now has no roof, it having been removed early in the nineteenth century. Its construction dating is also uncertain. Records suggest it was initiated by Bishop Eustace (1197–1215), and it is a notable example of Early English Gothic style. But there are doubts about just how early, especially as Eustace had taken refuge in France in 1208, and had no access to his funds for the next 3 years. George Gilbert Scott argued that details of its decoration, particularly the 'syncopated arches' and the use of Purbeck marble shafts, bear comparison with St Hugh's Choir, Lincoln Cathedral, and the west porch at St Albans, which both predate Eustace, whereas the foliage carvings and other details offer a date after 1220, suggesting it could be a project taken up, or re-worked by Bishop Hugh of Northwold.

=== Presbytery and East end ===
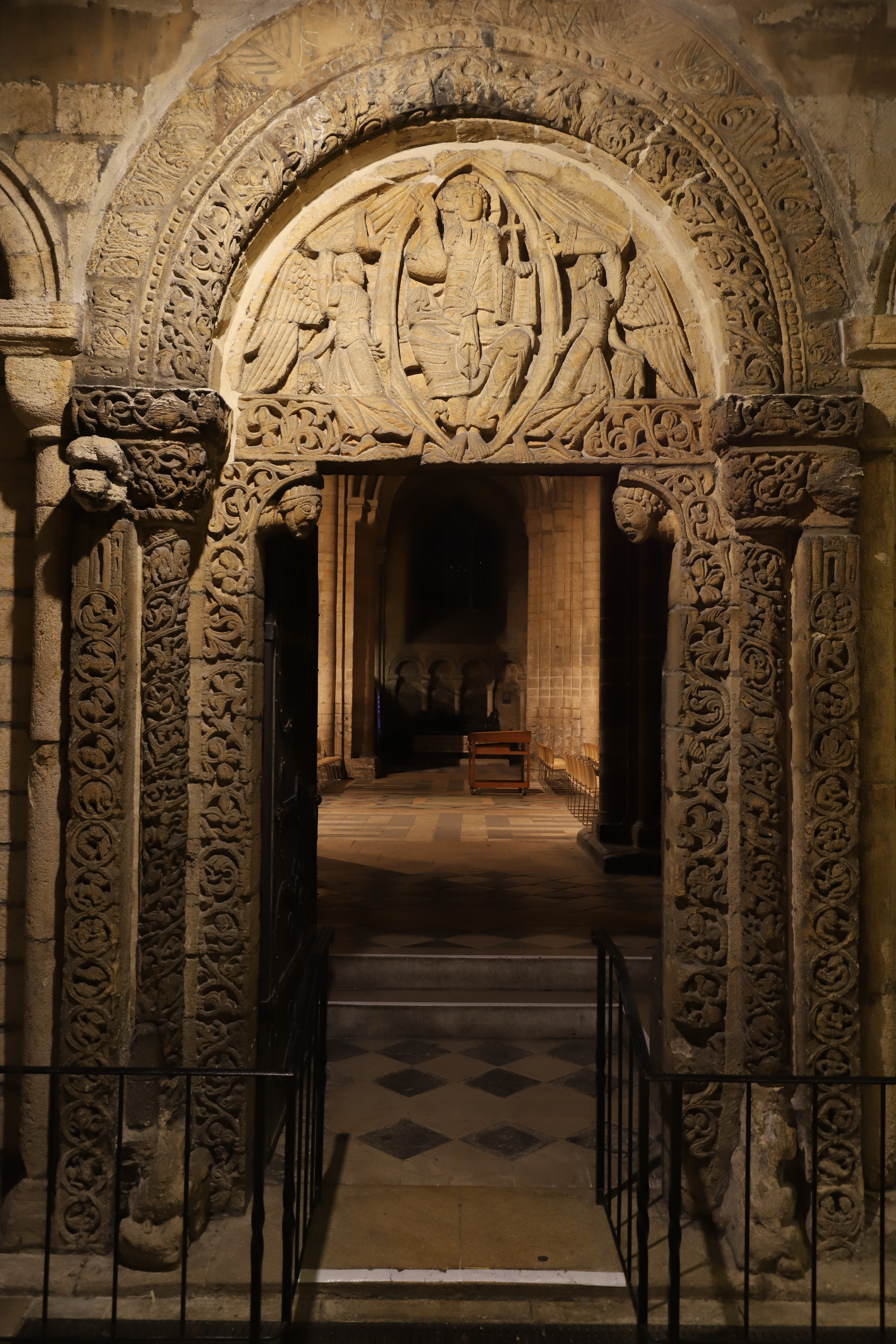
The Prior's Door in the south wall of the nave. The well-preserved tympanum carving is thought to date from 1135.

The first major reworking of an element of the Norman building was undertaken by Hugh of Northwold (bishop 1229–54). The eastern arm had been only four bays, running from the choir (then located at the crossing itself) to the high altar and the shrine to Etheldreda. In 1234 Northwold began an eastward addition of six further bays, which were built over 17 years, in a richly ornamented style with extensive use of Purbeck marble pillars and foliage carvings. It was built using the same bay dimensions, wall thicknesses and elevations as the Norman parts of the nave, but with an Early English Gothic style that makes it 'the most refined and richly decorated English building of its period'. St Etheldreda's remains were translated to a new shrine immediately east of the high altar within the new structure, and on completion of these works in 1252 the cathedral was reconsecrated in the presence of King Henry III and Prince Edward. As well as a greatly expanded presbytery, the new east end had the effect of inflating still further the significance of St Etheldreda's shrine. Surviving fragments of the shrine pedestal suggest its decoration was similar to the interior walls of the Galilee porch. The relics of the saints Wihtburh, Seaxburh (sisters of St Etheldreda) and Ermenilda (daughter of St Seaxburh of Ely) would also have been accommodated, and the new building provided much more space for pilgrims to visit the shrines, via a door in the North Transept. The presbytery has subsequently been used for the burials and memorials of over 100 individuals connected with the abbey and cathedral.

=== Lady Chapel ===
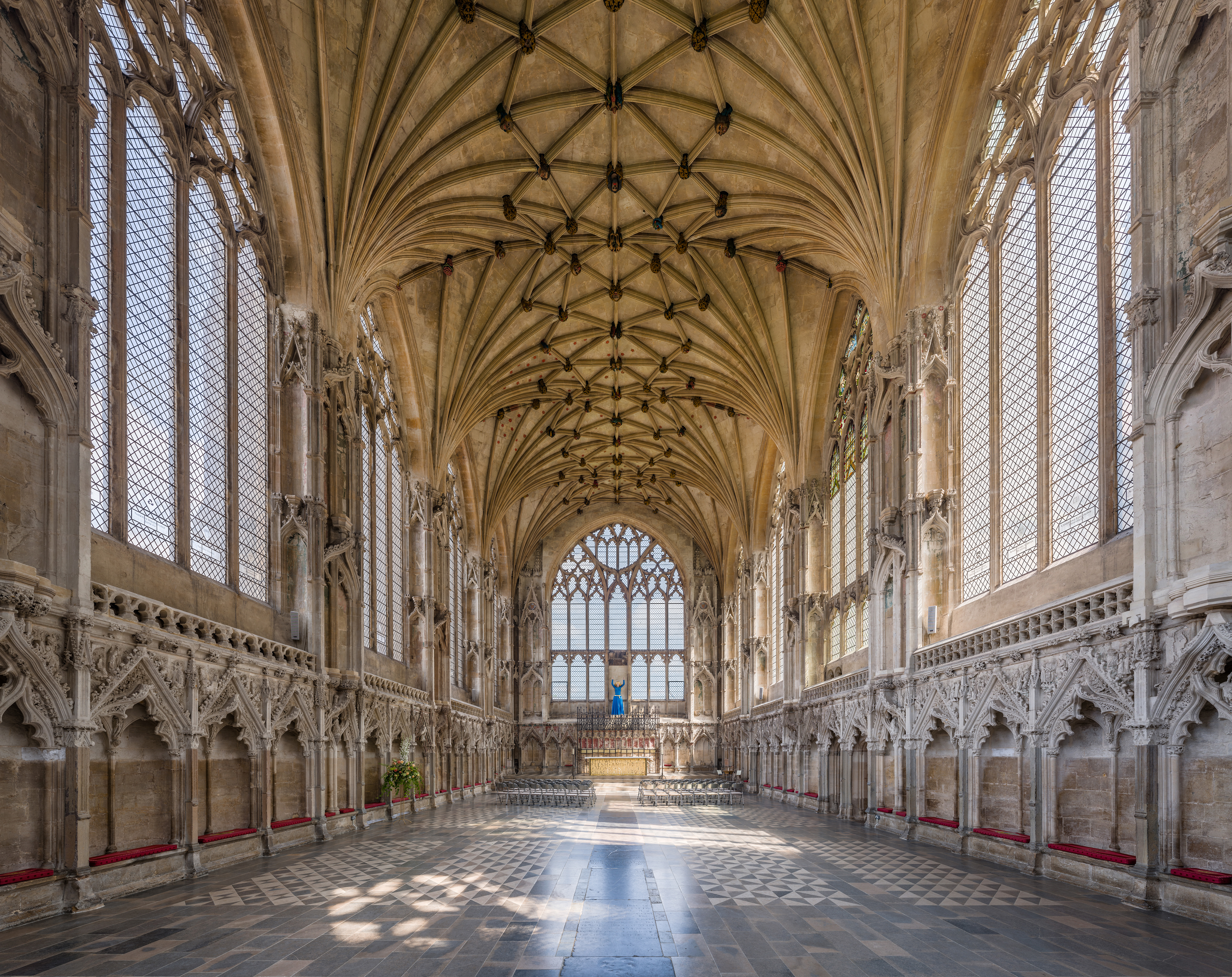
The Lady Chapel

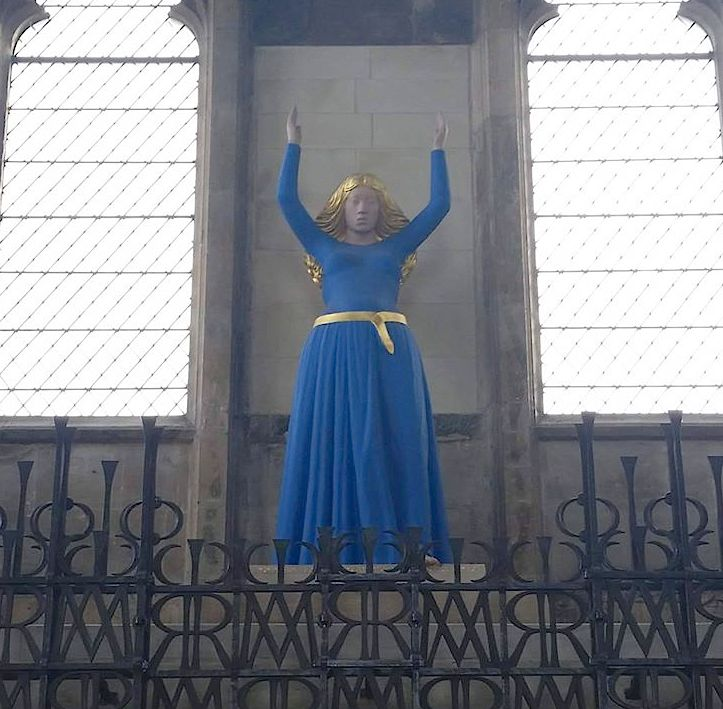
The Virgin Mary (2000) in the Lady Chapel, by David Wynne (1926–2014)

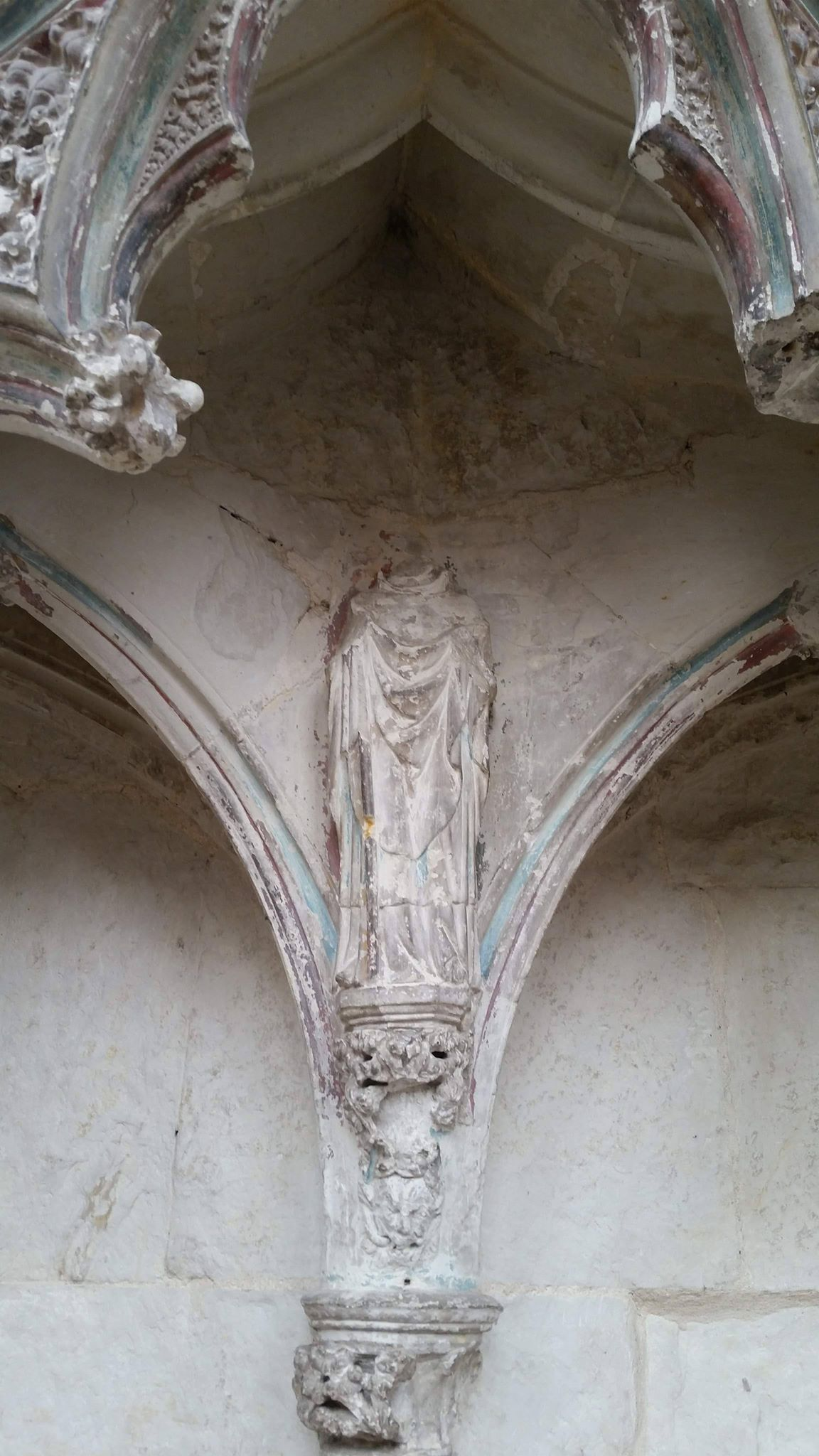
Headless statue in the Lady Chapel vandalised in the English Reformation; an example of iconoclasm

In 1321, under the sacrist Alan of Walsingham, work began on a large free-standing Lady Chapel, linked to the north aisle of the chancel by a covered walkway. The chapel is 100 feet (30 m) long and 46 feet (14 m) wide, and was built in an exuberant 'Decorated' Gothic style over the course of the next 30 years. Masons and finances were unexpectedly required for the main church from 1322, which must have slowed the progress of the chapel. The north and south wall each have five bays, comprising large traceried windows separated by pillars each of which has eight substantial niches and canopies which once held statues.

Below the window line, and running round three sides of the chapel is an arcade of richly decorated 'nodding ogees', with Purbeck marble pillars, creating scooped out seating booths. There are three arches per bay plus a grander one for each main pillar, each with a projecting pointed arch covering a subdividing column topped by a statue of a bishop or king. Above each arch is a pair of spandrels containing carved scenes which create a cycle of 93 carved relief sculptures of the life and miracles of the Virgin Mary. The carvings and sculptures would all have been painted. The window glass would all have been brightly coloured with major schemes perhaps of biblical narratives, of which a few small sections have survived. At the reformation, the edict to remove images from the cathedral was carried out very thoroughly by Bishop Thomas Goodrich. The larger statues have gone. The relief scenes were built into the wall, so each face or statue was individually hacked off, but leaving many finely carved details, and numerous puzzles as to what the original scenes showed. After the reformation it was redeployed as the parish church (Holy Trinity) for the town, a situation which continued up to 1938.

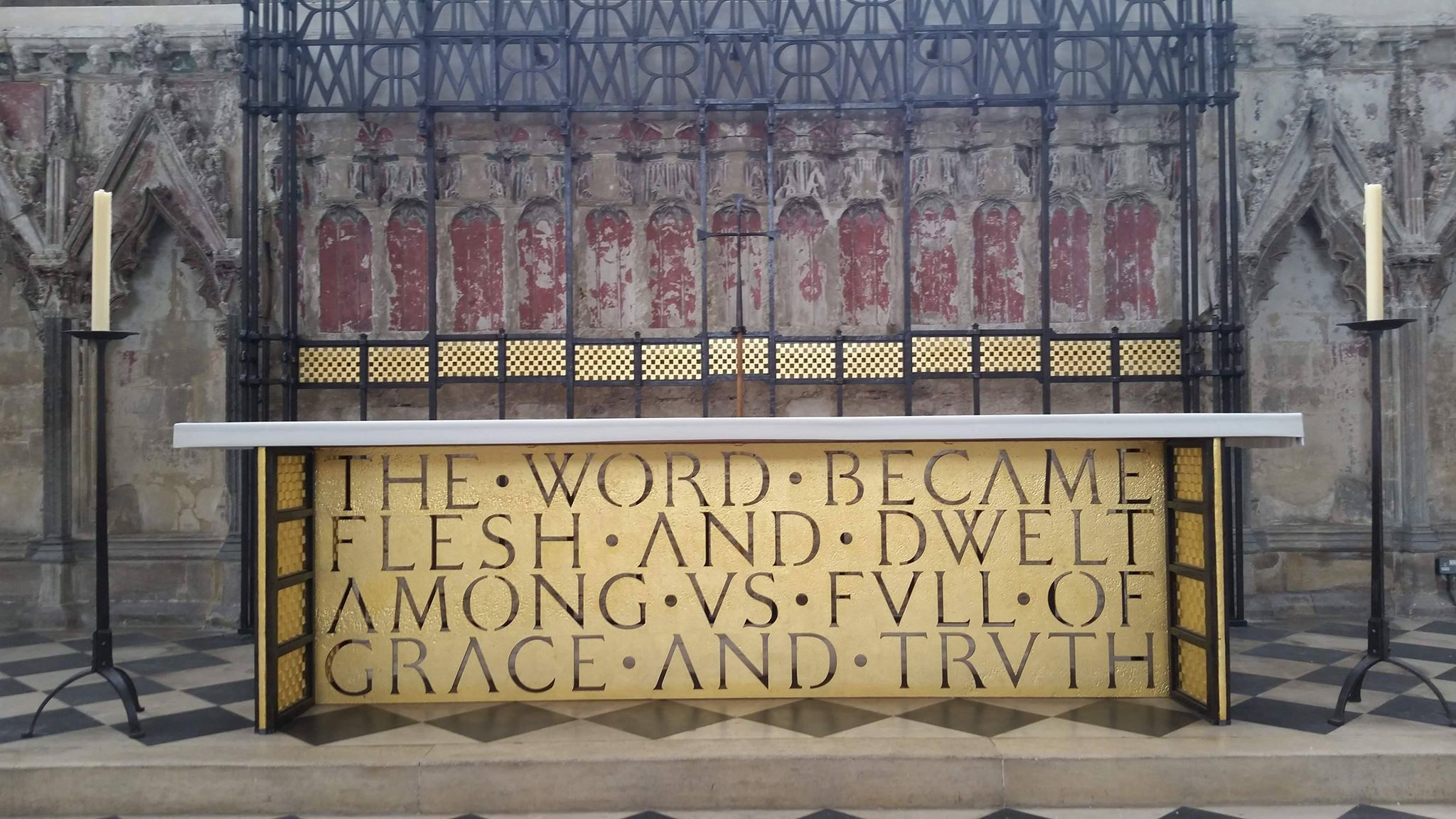
Altar of the Lady Chapel

In 2000 a life-size statue of the Virgin Mary by David Wynne was installed above the lady chapel altar. The statue was criticised by local people and the cathedral dean said he had been inundated with letters of complaint.

=== Octagon ===
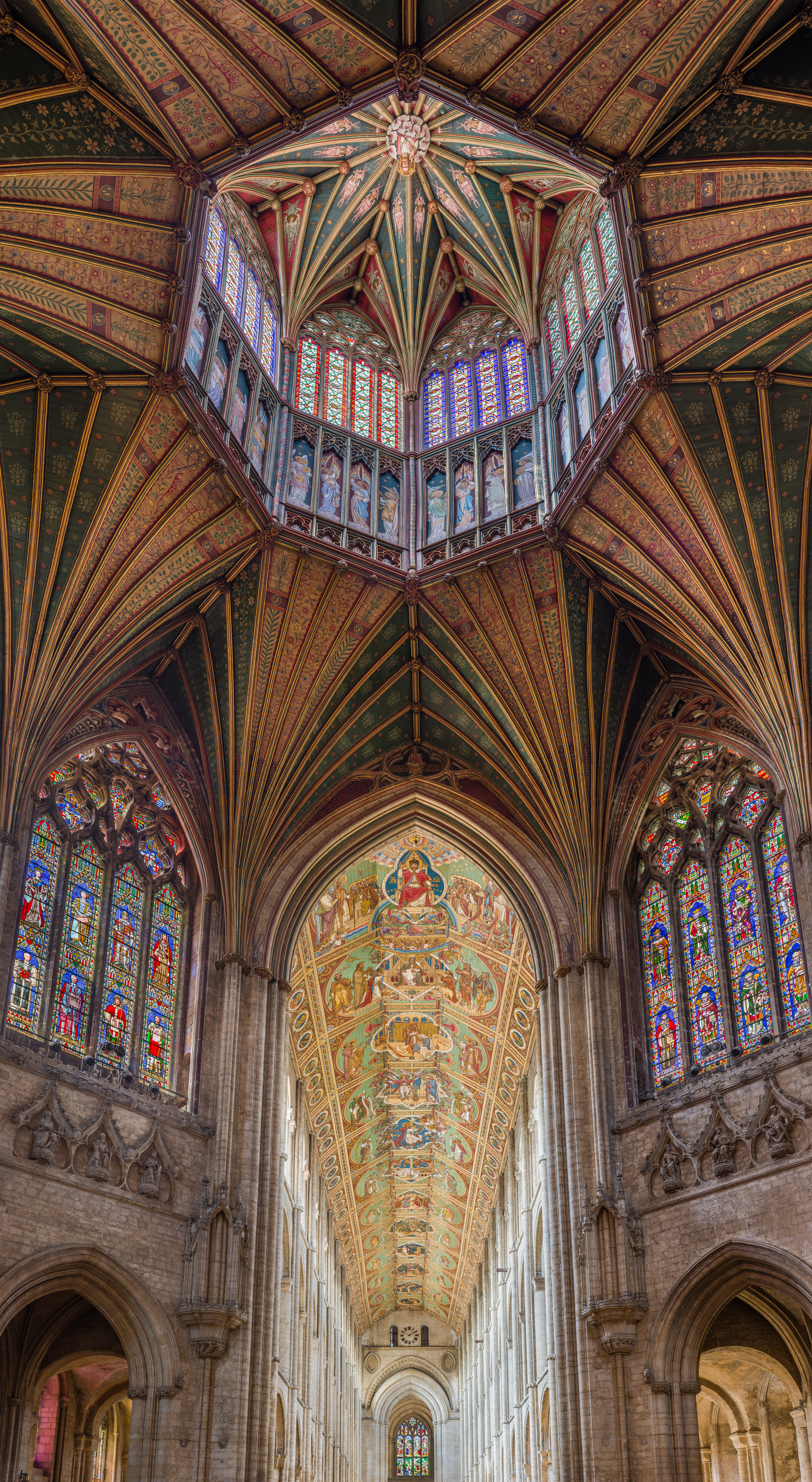
The ceiling of the nave and lantern, viewed from the Octagon looking west

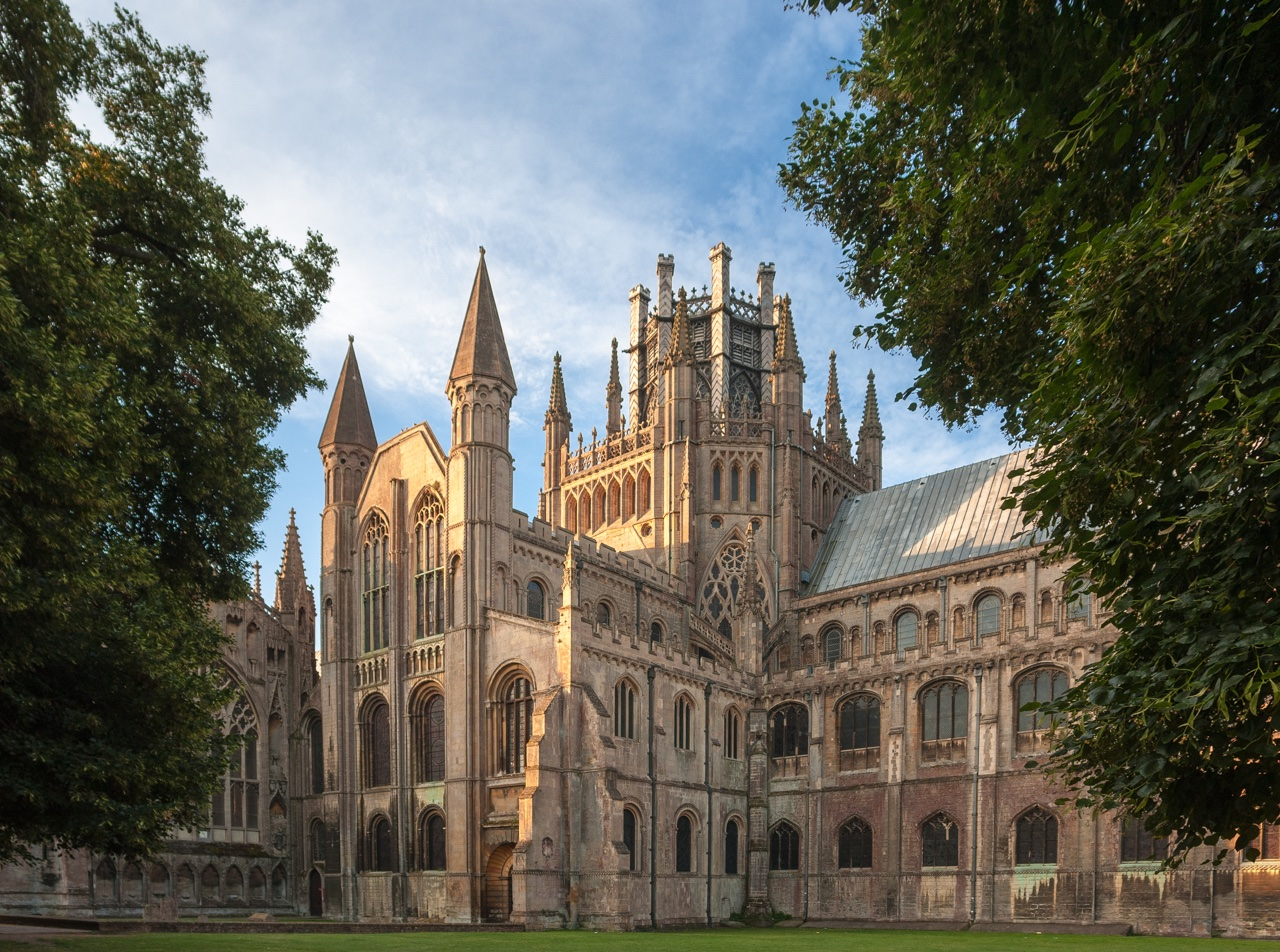
An external view of the octagon tower

The central octagonal tower, with its vast internal open space and its pinnacles and lantern above, forms the most distinctive and celebrated feature of the cathedral. However, what Pevsner describes as Ely's 'greatest individual achievement of architectural genius' came about through a disaster at the centre of the cathedral. On the night of 12–13 February 1322, possibly as a result of digging foundations for the Lady Chapel, the Norman central crossing tower collapsed. Work on the Lady Chapel was suspended as attention transferred to dealing with this disaster. Instead of being replaced by a new tower on the same ground plan, the crossing was enlarged to an octagon, removing all four of the original tower piers and absorbing the adjoining bays of the nave, chancel and transepts to define an open area far larger than the square base of the original tower. The construction of this unique and distinctive feature was overseen by Alan of Walsingham. The extent of his influence on the design continues to be a matter of debate, as are the reasons such a radical step was taken. Mistrust of the soft ground under the failed tower piers may have been a major factor in moving all the weight of the new tower further out.

The large stone octagonal tower, with its eight internal archways, leads up to timber vaulting that appears to allow the large glazed timber lantern to balance on their slender struts. The roof and lantern are actually held up by a complex timber structure above the vaulting which could not be built in this way today because there are no trees big enough. The central lantern, also octagonal in form, but with angles offset from the great Octagon, has panels showing pictures of musical angels, which can be opened, with access from the Octagon roof-space, so that real choristers can sing from on high. More wooden vaulting forms the lantern roof. At the centre is a wooden boss carved from a single piece of oak, showing Christ in Majesty. The elaborate joinery and timberwork was brought about by William Hurley, master carpenter in the royal service.

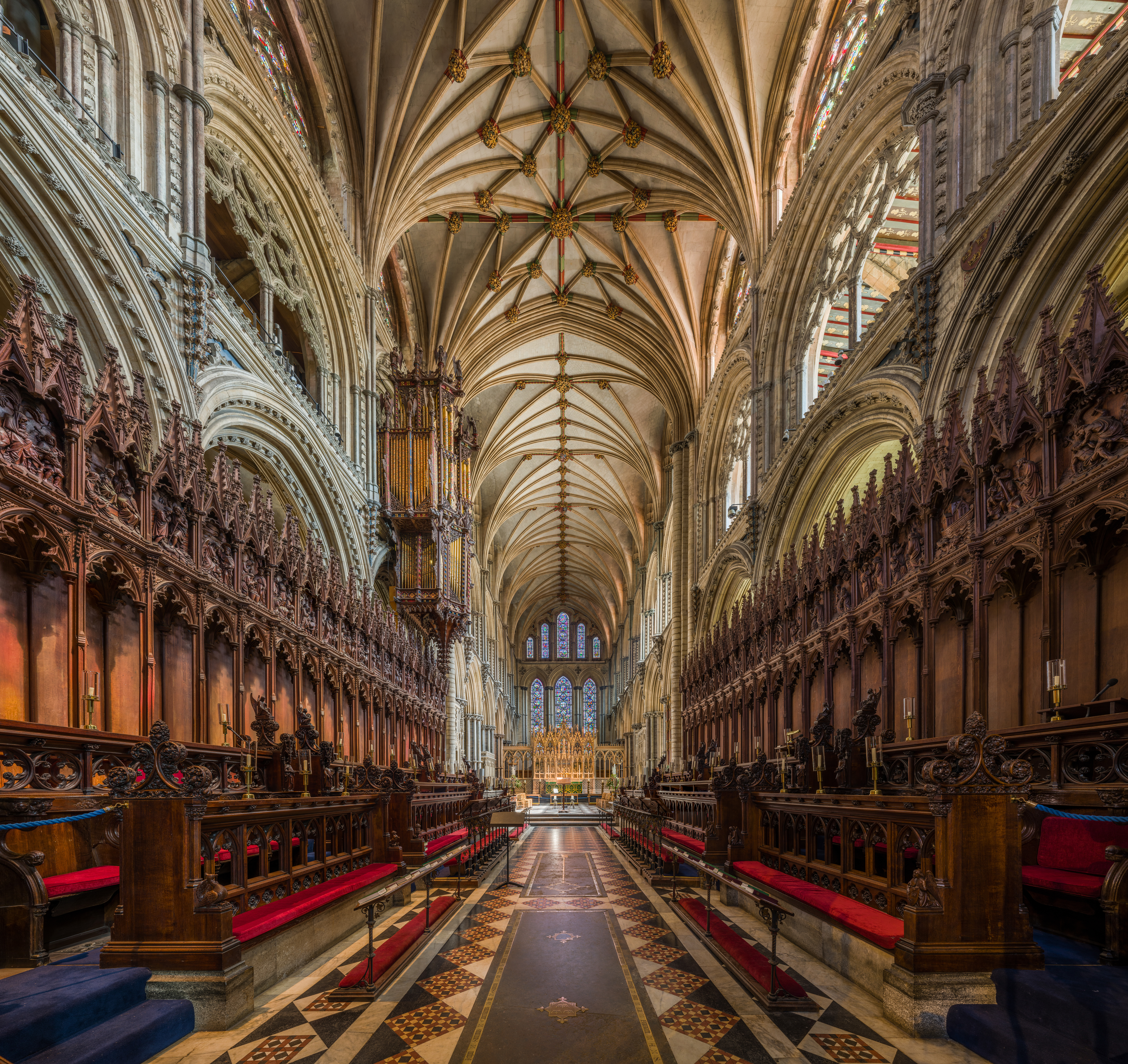
The choir

It is unclear what damage was caused to the Norman chancel by the fall of the tower, but the three remaining bays were reconstructed under Bishop John Hotham (1316–1337) in an ornate Decorated style with flowing tracery. Structural evidence shows that this work was a remodelling rather than a total rebuilding. New choirstalls with carved misericords and canopy work were installed beneath the octagon, in a similar position to their predecessors. Work was resumed on the Lady Chapel, and the two westernmost bays of Northwold's presbytery were adapted by unroofing the triforia so as to enhance the lighting of Etheldreda's shrine. Starting at about the same time the remaining lancet windows of the aisles and triforia of the presbytery were gradually replaced by broad windows with flowing tracery. At the same period extensive work took place on the monastic buildings, including the construction of the elegant chapel of Prior Crauden.

=== Chantry chapels ===
In the late fifteenth and early sixteenth centuries elaborate chantry chapels were inserted in the easternmost bays of the presbytery aisles, on the north for Bishop John Alcock (1486–1500) and on the south for Bishop Nicholas West (1515–33).

John Alcock was born in around 1430, the son of a Hull merchant, but achieved high office in both church and state. Amongst his many duties and posts he was given charge of Edward IV's sons, who became known as the Princes in the Tower. That Alcock faithfully served Edward IV and his sons as well Henry VII adds to the mystery of how their fate was kept secret. Appointed bishop of Rochester and then Worcester by Edward IV, he was also declared 'Lord President of Wales' in 1476. On Henry VII's victory over Richard III in 1485, Alcock became interim Lord Chancellor and in 1486 was appointed Bishop of Ely. As early as 1476 he had endowed a chantry for his parents at Hull, but the resources Ely put at his disposal allowed him to found Jesus College, Cambridge and build his own fabulous chantry chapel in an ornate style. The statue niches with their architectural canopies are crammed so chaotically together that some of the statues never got finished as they were so far out of sight. Others, although completed, were overlooked by the destructions of the reformation, and survived when all the others were destroyed. The extent that the chapel is squashed in, despite cutting back parts of the Norman walls, raises the possibility that the design, and perhaps even some of the stonework, was done with a more spacious bay at Worcester in mind. On his death in 1500 he was buried within his chapel.

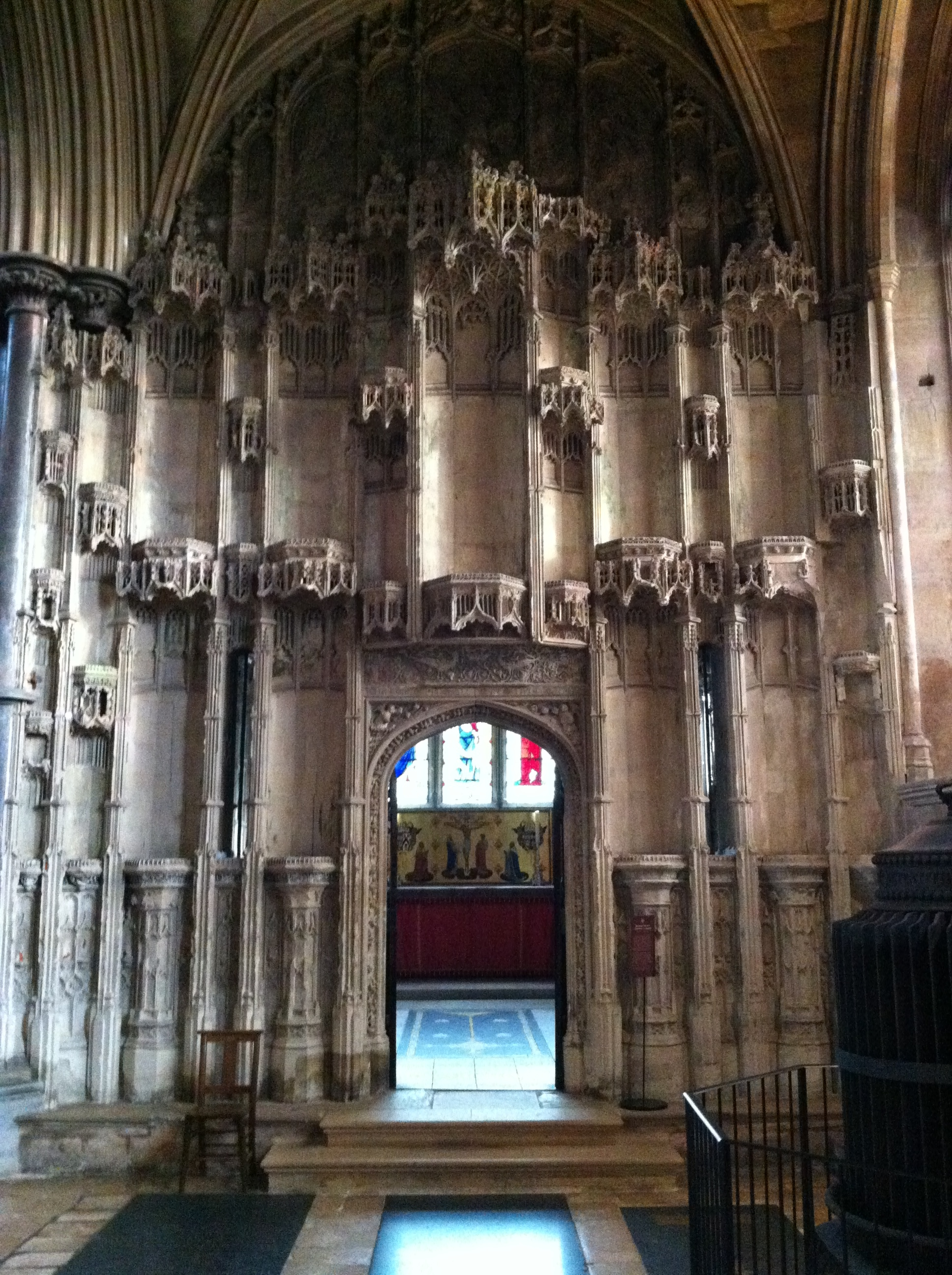
Bishop West's Chantry Chapel. The niche statues were destroyed by his successor, the reformer Bishop Goodrich.

Nicholas West had studied at Cambridge, Oxford and Bologna, had been a diplomat in the service of Henry VII and Henry VIII, and became Bishop of Ely in 1515. For the remaining 19 years of his life he 'lived in greater splendour than any other prelate of his time, having more than a hundred servants.' He was able to build the magnificent Chantry chapel at the south-east corner of the presbytery, panelled with niches for statues (which were destroyed or disfigured just a few years later at the reformation), and with fan tracery forming the ceiling, and West's tomb on the south side.

In 1771 the chapel was also used to house the bones of seven Saxon 'benefactors of the church'. These had been translated from the old Saxon Abbey into the Norman building, and had been placed in a wall of the choir when it stood in the Octagon. When the choir stalls were moved, their enclosing wall was demolished, and the bones of Wulfstan (died 1023), Osmund of Sweden, Athelstan of Elmham, Ælfwine of Elmham, Ælfgar of Elmham, Eadnoth of Dorchester and Byrhtnoth, ealdorman of Essex, were found, and relocated into West's chapel. Also sharing Nicholas West's chapel, against the east wall, is the tomb memorial to the bishop Bowyer Sparke, who died in 1836.

=== Dissolution and Reformation ===
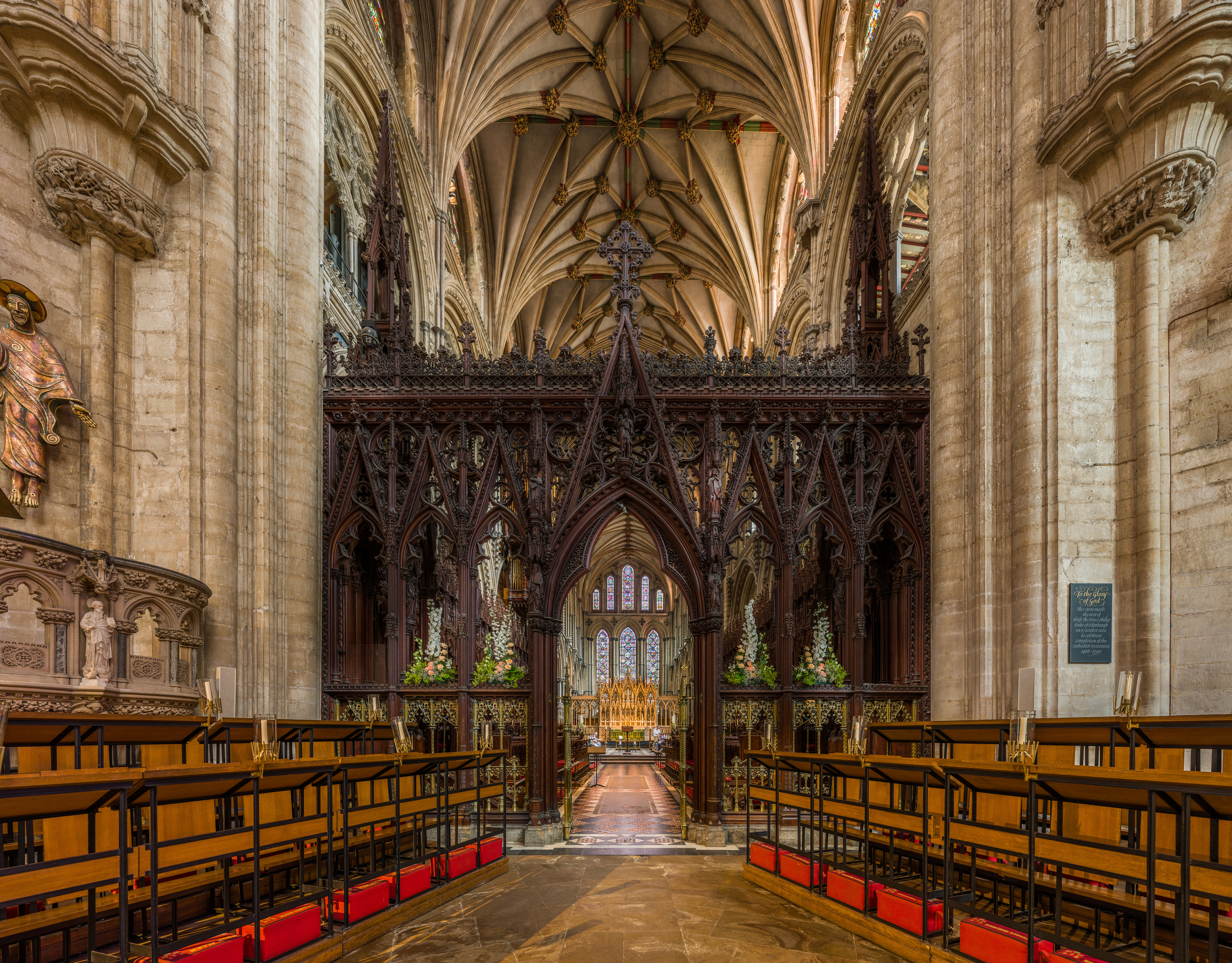
The rood screen viewed from the nave

On 18 November 1539 the royal commissioners took possession of the monastery and all its possessions, and for nearly two years its future hung in the balance as Henry VIII and his advisers considered what role, if any, Cathedrals might play in the emerging Protestant church. On 10 September 1541 a new charter was granted to Ely, at which point Robert Steward, the last prior, was re-appointed as the first dean, who, with eight prebendaries formed the dean and chapter, the new governing body of the cathedral. Under Bishop Thomas Goodrich's orders, first the shrines to the Anglo-Saxon saints were destroyed, and as iconoclasm increased, nearly all the stained glass and much of the sculpture in the cathedral was destroyed or defaced during the 1540s. In the Lady Chapel the free-standing statues were destroyed and all 147 carved figures in the frieze of St Mary were decapitated, as were the numerous sculptures on West's chapel. The Cathedrals were eventually spared on the basis of three useful functions: propagation of true worship of God, educational activity, and care of the poor. To this end, vicars choral, lay clerks and boy choristers were all appointed (many having previously been members of the monastic community), to assist in worship. A grammar school with 24 scholars was established in the monastic buildings, and in the 1550s plate and vestments were sold to buy books and establish a library. The passageway running to the Lady Chapel was turned into an almshouse for six bedemen. The Lady Chapel itself was handed over to the town as Holy Trinity Parish Church in 1566, replacing a very unsatisfactory lean-to structure that stood against the north wall of the nave. Many of the monastic buildings became the houses of the new Cathedral hierarchy, although others were demolished. Much of the Cathedral itself had little purpose. The whole East end was used simply as a place for burials and memorials. The cathedral was damaged in the Dover Straits Earthquake of 6 April 1580, where stones fell from the vaulting.

Difficult as the sixteenth century had been for the cathedral, it was the period of the Commonwealth that came nearest to destroying both the institution and the buildings. Throughout the 1640s, with Oliver Cromwell's army occupying the Isle of Ely, a puritanical regime of worship was imposed. Bishop Matthew Wren was arrested in 1642 and spent the next 18 years in the Tower of London. That no significant destruction of images occurred during the Civil War and the Commonwealth would appear to be because it had been done so thoroughly 100 years before. In 1648 parliament encouraged the demolition of the buildings, so that the materials could be sold to pay for 'relief of sick and maimed soldiers, widows and children'. That this did not happen, and that the building suffered nothing worse than neglect, may have been due to protection by Oliver Cromwell, although the uncertainty of the times, and apathy rather than hostility to the building may have been as big a factor.

== Restoration ==
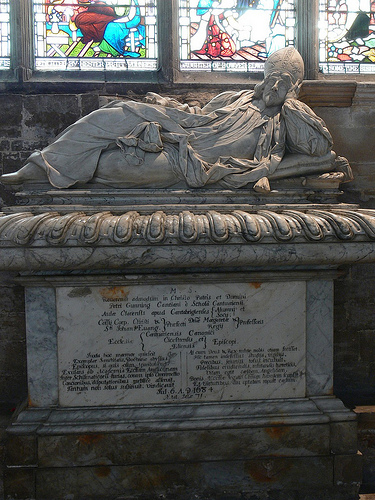
Peter Gunning Monument, Ely Cathedral

When Charles II was invited to return to Britain, alongside the political restoration there began a process of re-establishing the Church of England. Matthew Wren, whose high church views had kept him in prison throughout the period of the Commonwealth, was able to appoint a new cathedral chapter. The dean, by contrast was appointed by the crown. The three big challenges for the new hierarchy were to begin repairs on the neglected buildings, to re-establish Cathedral services, and to recover its lands, rights and incomes. The search for lost deeds and records to establish their rights took over 20 years but most of the rights to the dispersed assets appear to have been regained.

In the 1690s a number of very fine baroque furnishings were introduced, notably a marble font (for many years kept in St Peter's Church, Prickwillow,) and an organ case mounted on the Romanesque pulpitum (the stone screen dividing the nave from the liturgical choir) with trumpeting angels and other embellishments. In 1699 the north-west corner of the north transept collapsed and had to be rebuilt. The works included the insertion of a fine classical doorway in the north face. Christopher Wren has sometimes been associated with this feature, and he may have been consulted by Robert Grumbold, the mason in charge of the project. Grumbold had worked with Wren on Trinity College Library in Cambridge a few years earlier, and Wren would have been familiar with the Cathedral through his uncle Matthew Wren, bishop from 1638 to 1667. He was certainly among the people with whom the dean (John Lambe 1693–1708) discussed the proposed works during a visit to London. The damaged transept took from 1699 to 1702 to rebuild, and with the exception of the new doorway, the works faithfully re-instated the Romanesque walls, windows, and detailing. This was a landmark approach in the history of restoration.

=== Bentham and Essex ===
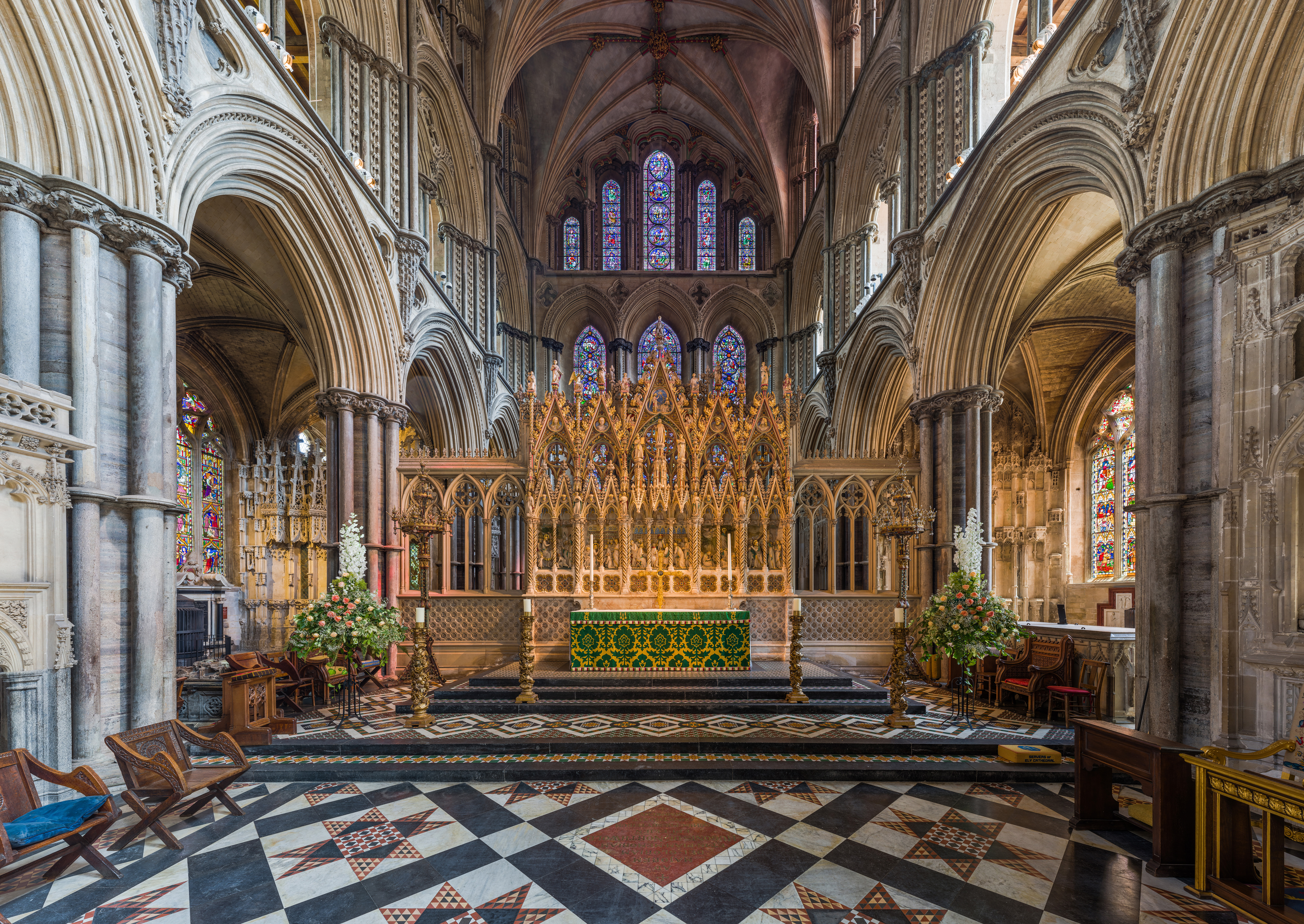
The high altar

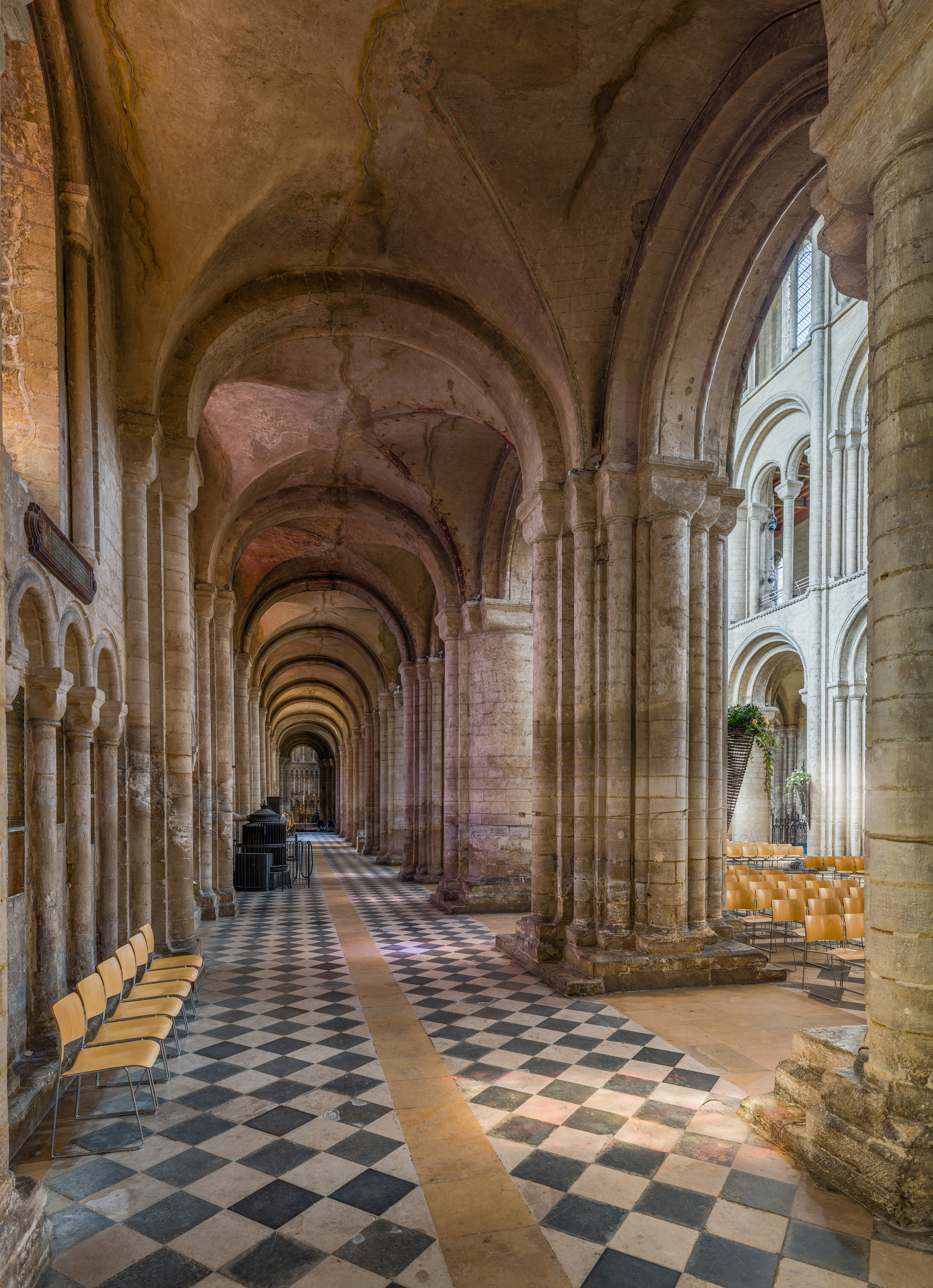
The south aisle of the nave looking west

Two people stand out in Ely Cathedral's eighteenth-century history, one a minor canon and the other an architectural contractor. James Bentham (1709–1794), building on the work of his father Samuel, studied the history of both the institution and architecture of the cathedral, culminating in 1771 with his publication of The History and Antiquities of the Conventual and Cathedral Church of Ely. He sought out original documents to provide definitive biographical lists of abbots, priors, deans and bishops, alongside a history of the abbey and cathedral, and was able to set out the architectural development of the building with detailed engravings and plans. These plans, elevations and sections had been surveyed by the architect James Essex (1722–1784), who by this means was able to both highlight the poor state of parts of the building, and understand its complex interdependencies.

The level of expertise that Bentham and Essex brought to the situation enabled a well-prioritised series of repairs and sensitive improvements to be proposed that occupied much of the later eighteenth century. Essex identified the decay of the octagon lantern as the starting point of a major series of repairs, and was appointed in 1757 to oversee the work. 400 years of weathering and decay may have removed many of the gothic features, and shortage of funds allied to a Georgian suspicion of ornament resulted in plain and pared down timber and leadwork on the lantern. He was then able to move on to re-roof the entire eastern arm and restore the eastern gable which had been pushed outwards some 2 feet (61 cm).

Bentham and Essex were both enthusiastic proponents of a longstanding plan to relocate the 14th-century choir stalls from under the octagon. With the octagon and east roof dealt with, the scheme was embarked on in 1769, with Bentham, still only a minor canon, appointed as clerk of works. By moving the choir stalls to the far east end of the cathedral, the octagon became a spacious public area for the first time, with vistas to east and west and views of the octagon vaulting. They also removed the Romanesque pulpitum and put in a new choir screen two bays east of the octagon, surmounted by the 1690s organ case. Despite their antiquarian interests, Bentham and Essex appear to have dismantled the choir stalls with alarming lack of care, and saw no problem in clearing away features at the east end, and removing the pulpitum and medieval walls surrounding the choir stalls. The north wall turned out to incorporate the bones of seven 'Saxon worthies' which would have featured on the pilgrim route into the pre-Reformation cathedral. The bones were rehoused in Bishop West's Chapel. The choir stalls, with their misericords were however retained, and the restoration as a whole was relatively sympathetic by the standards of the period.

=== The Victorians ===
The next major period of restoration began in the 1840s and much of the oversight was the responsibility of Dean George Peacock (1839–58). In conjunction with the Cambridge Professor Robert Willis, he undertook thorough investigations into the structure, archaeology and artistic elements of the building, and made a start on what became an extensive series of refurbishments by restoring the south-west transept. This had been used as a 'workshop', and by stripping out more recent material and restoring the Norman windows and arcading, they set a pattern that would be adopted in much of the Victorian period works. In 1845, by which time the cathedral had works underway in many areas, a visiting architect, George Basevi, who was inspecting the west tower, tripped, and fell 36 feet to his death. He was given a burial in the north choir aisle. Works at this time included cleaning back thick layers of limewash, polishing pillars of Purbeck marble, painting and gilding roof bosses and corbels in the choir, and a major opening up of the West tower. A plaster vault was removed that had been put in only 40 years before, and the clock and bells were moved higher. The addition of iron ties and supports allowed removal of vast amounts of infill that was supposed to strengthen the tower, but had simply added more weight and compounded the problems.

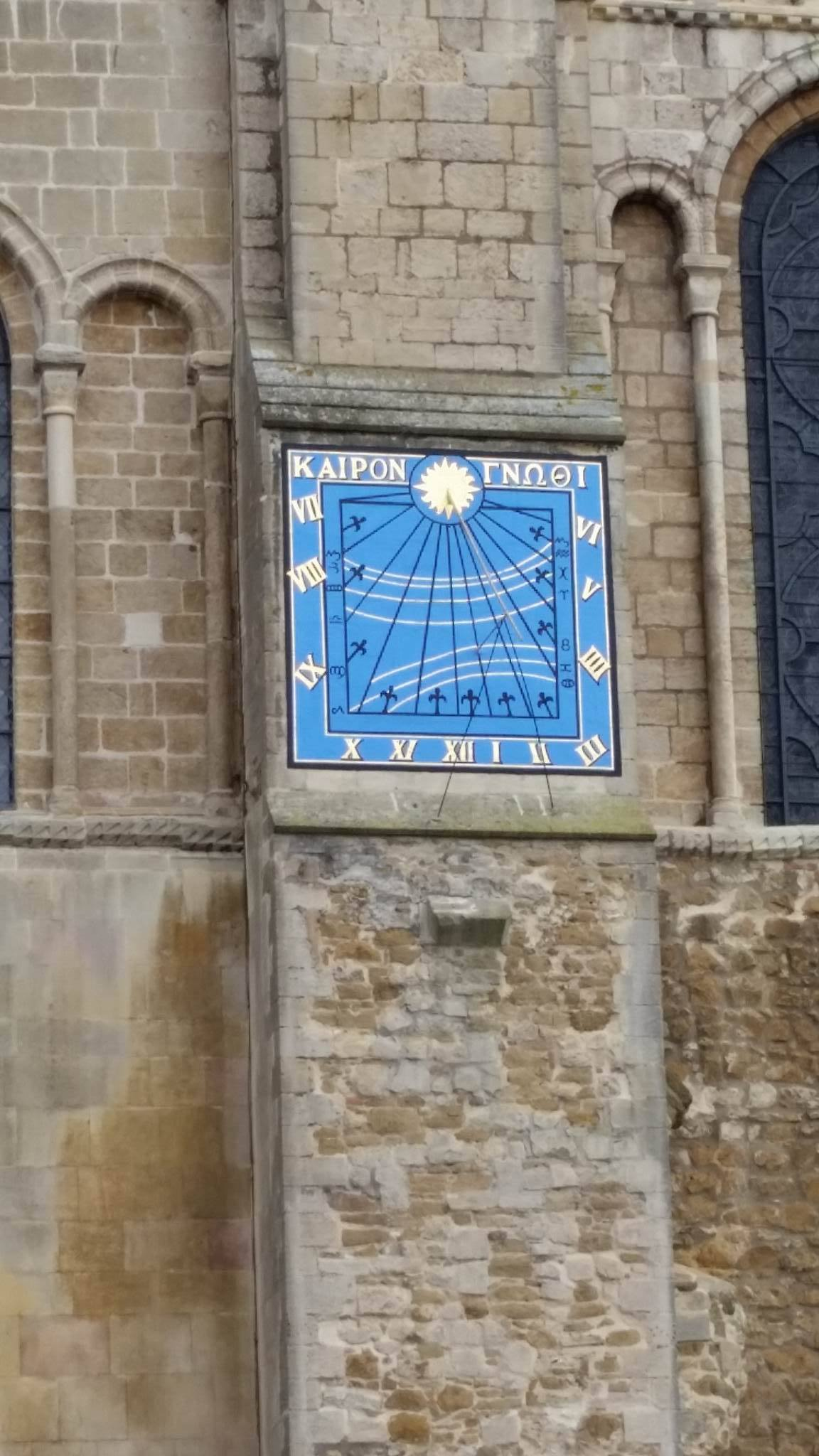
Vertical sundial on South Transept Wall

==== George Gilbert Scott ====
George Gilbert Scott was, by 1847, emerging as a successful architect and keen exponent of the Gothic Revival. He was brought in, as a professional architect to bolster the enthusiastic amateur partnership of Peacock and Willis, initially in the re-working of the fourteenth-century choir stalls. Having been at the East end for 80 years, Scott oversaw their move back towards the Octagon, but this time remaining within the eastern arm, keeping the open space of the Octagon clear. This was Scott's first cathedral commission. He went on to work on a new carved wooden screen and brass gates, moved the high altar two bays westwards, and installed a lavishly carved and ornamented alabaster reredos carved by Rattee and Kett, a new font for the south-west transept, a new Organ case and later a new pulpit, replacing the neo-Norman pulpit designed by John Groves in 1803. In 1876 Scott's designs for the octagon lantern parapet and pinnacles were implemented, returning it to a form which, to judge from pre-Essex depictions, seems to be genuinely close to the original. Various new furnishings replaced the baroque items installed in the 1690s.

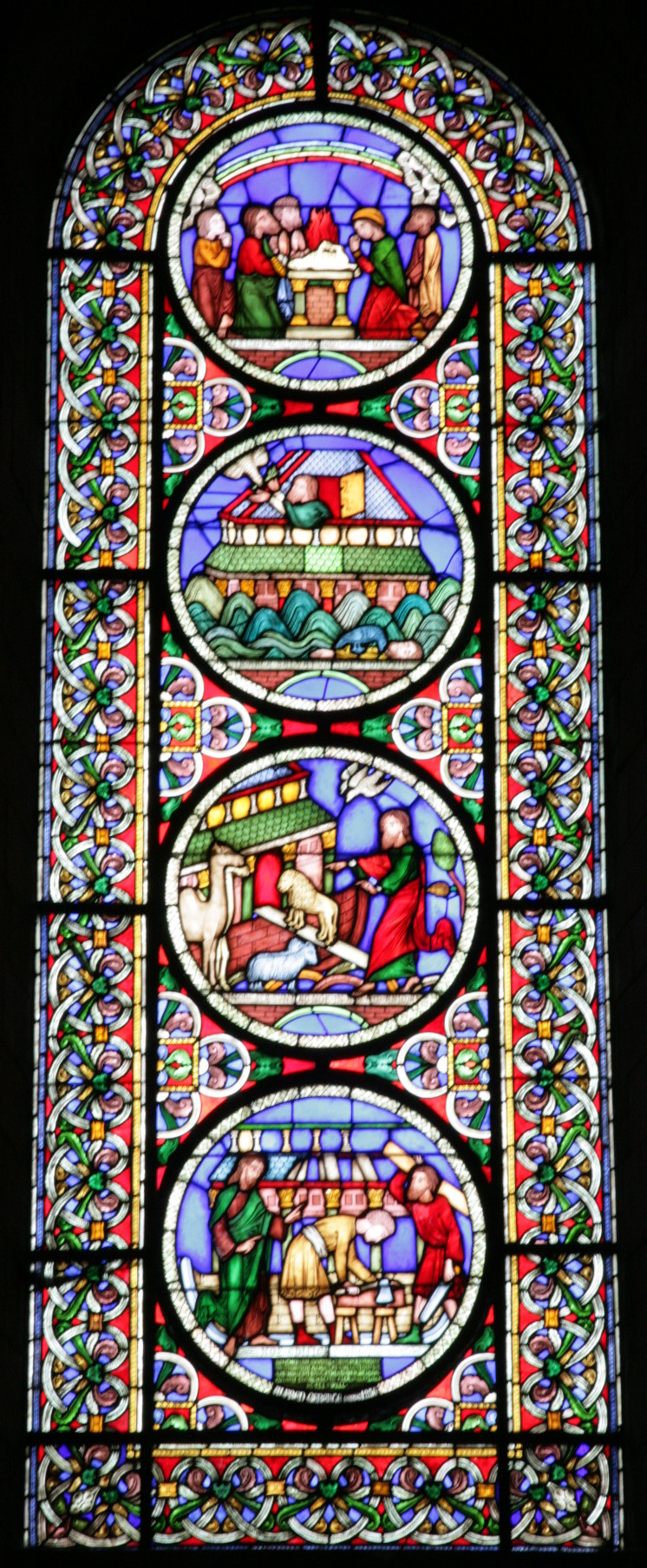
The Noah Window, by Alfred Gérente, in the nave south aisle

==== Stained glass ====
In 1845 Edward Sparke, son of the bishop Bowyer Sparke, and himself a canon, spearheaded a major campaign to re-glaze the cathedral with coloured glass. At that time there was hardly any medieval glass (mostly a few survivals in the Lady Chapel) and not much of post-reformation date. An eighteenth-century attempt to get James Pearson to produce a scheme of painted glass had produced only one window and some smaller fragments. With the rediscovery of staining techniques, and the renewed enthusiasm for stained glass that swept the country as the nineteenth century progressed, almost all areas of the cathedral received new glazing. Under Sparke's oversight, money was found from donors, groups, bequests, even gifts by the artists themselves, and by Edward Sparke himself. A wide variety of designers and manufacturers were deliberately used, to help find the right firm to fill the great lancets at the east end. In the event, it was William Wailes who undertook this in 1857, having already begun the four windows of the octagon, as well as contributions to the south west transept, south aisle and north transept. Other windows were by the Gérente brothers, William Warrington, Alexander Gibbs, Clayton and Bell, Ward and Nixon, Hardman & Co., and numerous other individuals and firms from England and France.

A timber boarded ceiling was installed in the nave and painted with scenes from the Old and New Testaments, first by Henry Styleman Le Strange and then, after Le Strange's death in 1862, completed by Thomas Gambier Parry, who also repainted the interior of the octagon.

A further major programme of structural restoration took place between 1986 and 2000 under Deans William Patterson (1984–90) and Michael Higgins (1991–2003), directed by successive Surveyors to the Fabric, initially Peter Miller and from 1994 Jane Kennedy. Much of this restoration work was carried out by Rattee and Kett. In 2000 a Processional Way was built, restoring the direct link between the north choir aisle and the Lady Chapel.

In 1972, the Stained Glass Museum was established to preserve windows from churches across the country that were being closed by redundancy. It opened to the public in 1979 in the north triforium of Ely Cathedral and following an appeal, an improved display space was created in the south triforium opening in 2000. Besides rescued pieces, the collection includes examples from Britain and abroad that have been donated or purchased through bequests, or are on loan from the Victoria and Albert Museum, the Royal Collection, and Friends of Friendless Churches.

== Religious community ==
Ely has been an important centre of Christian worship since the seventh century AD. Most of what is known about its history before the Norman Conquest comes from Bede's Historia ecclesiastica gentis Anglorum written early in the eighth century and from the Liber Eliensis, an anonymous chronicle written at Ely some time in the twelfth century, drawing on Bede for the very early years, and covering the history of the community until the twelfth century. According to these sources the first Christian community here was founded by Æthelthryth (romanised as "Etheldreda"), daughter of the Anglo-Saxon King Anna of East Anglia, who was born at Exning near Newmarket. She may have acquired land at Ely from her first husband Tondberht, described by Bede as a "prince" of the South Gyrwas. After the end of her second marriage to Ecgfrith, a prince of Northumbria, in 673 she set up and ruled as abbess a dual monastery at Ely for men and for women. When she died, a shrine was built there to her memory. This monastery is recorded as having been destroyed in about 870 in the course of Danish invasions. However, while the lay settlement of the time would have been a minor one, it is likely that a church survived there until its refoundation in the tenth century. The history of the religious community during that period is unclear, but accounts of the refoundation in the tenth century suggest that there had been an establishment of secular priests.

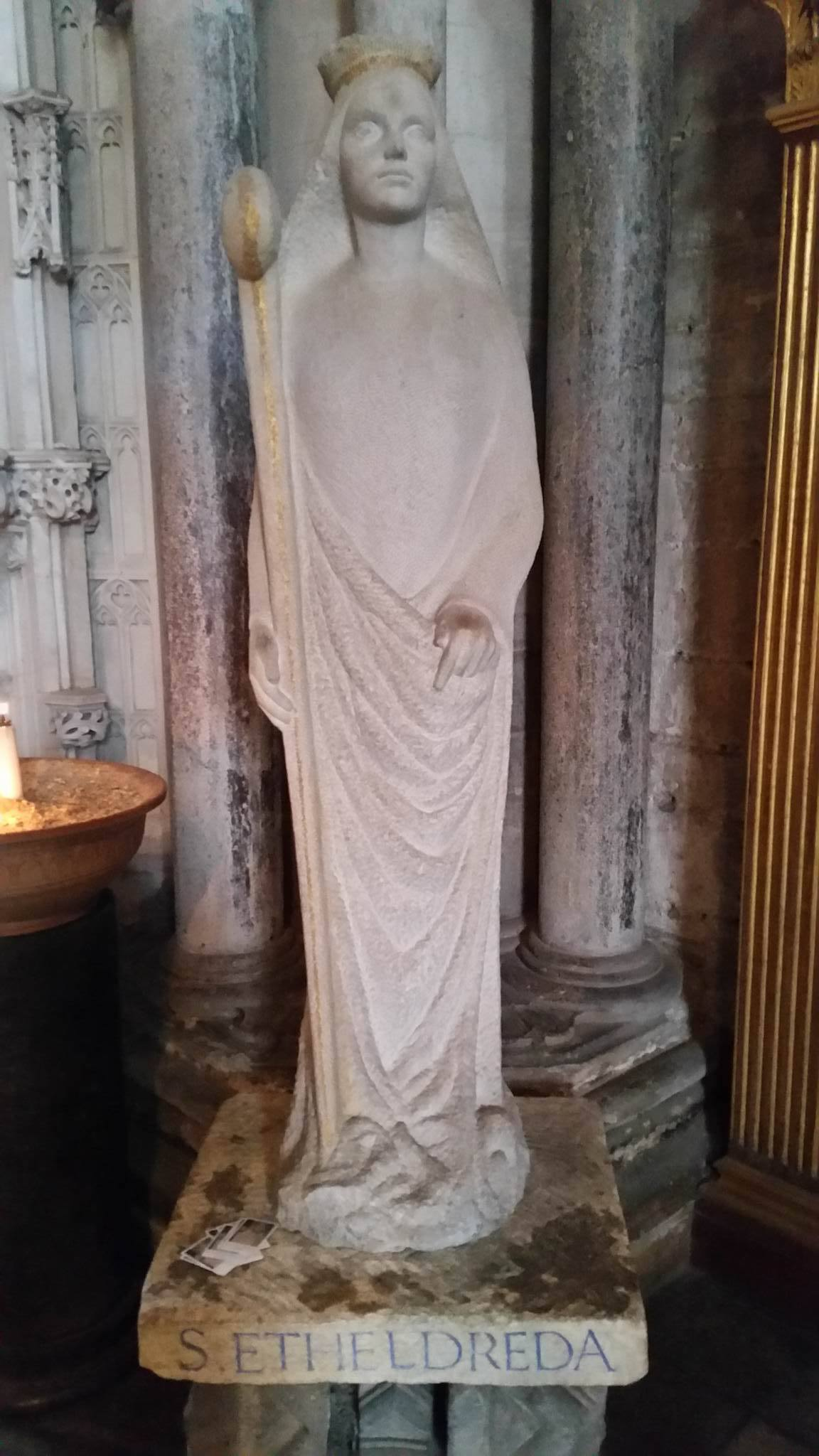
St Etheldreda (1961) by Philip Turner

In the course of the revival of the English church under Dunstan, Archbishop of Canterbury, and Aethelwold, Bishop of Winchester, Ely Abbey was reestablished in 970 as a community of Benedictine monks. This was one of a wave of monastic refoundations which locally included Peterborough and Ramsey (see English Benedictine Reform). Ely became one of the leading Benedictine houses in late Anglo-Saxon England. Following the Norman conquest of England in 1066 the abbey allied itself with the local resistance to Norman rule led by Hereward the Wake. The new regime having established control of the area, after the death of the abbot Thurstan, a Norman successor Theodwine was installed. In 1109 Ely attained cathedral status with the appointment of Hervey le Breton as bishop of the new diocese which was taken out of the very large diocese of Lincoln. This involved a division of the monastic property between the bishopric and the monastery, whose establishment was reduced from 70 to 40 monks, headed by a prior; the bishop being titular abbot. From 1216 the cathedral priory was part of the Canterbury Province of the English Benedictine Congregation, an umbrella chapter made up of the abbots and priors of the Benedictine houses of England, remaining so until the dissolution.

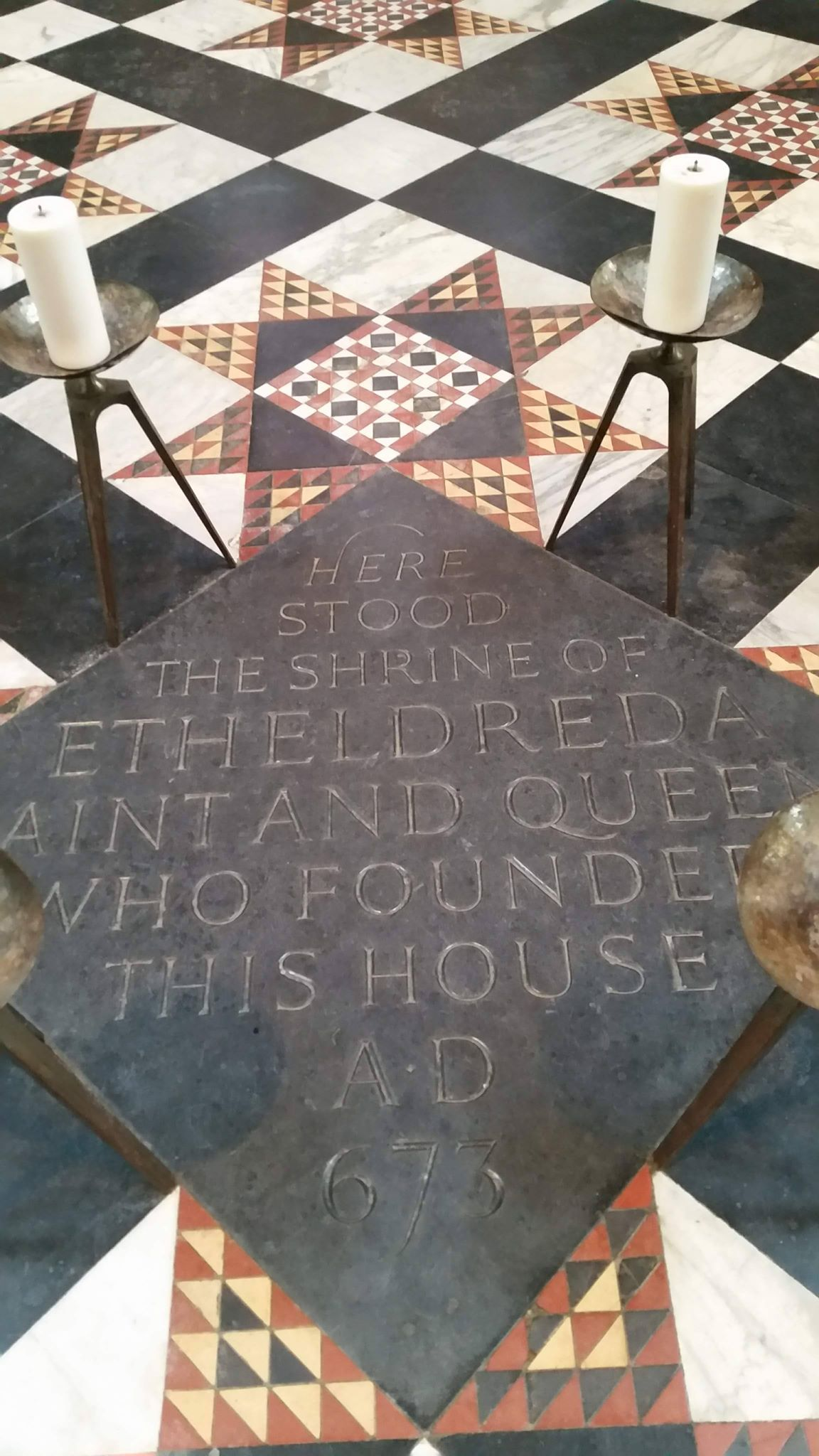
Former site of the shrine of St Etheldreda

In 1539, during the Dissolution of the Monasteries, Ely Cathedral Priory surrendered to Henry VIII's commissioners. The cathedral was refounded by royal charter in 1541 with the former prior Robert Steward as dean and the majority of the former monks as prebendaries and minor canons, supplemented by Matthew Parker, later Archbishop of Canterbury, and Richard Cox, later Bishop of Ely. With a brief interruption from 1649 to 1660 during the Commonwealth, when all cathedrals were abolished, this foundation has continued in its essentials to the twenty-first century, with a reduced number of residentiary canons now supplemented by a number of lay canons appointed under a Church Measure of 1999.

As with other cathedrals, Ely's pattern of worship centres around the Opus Dei, the daily programme of services drawing significantly on the Benedictine tradition. It also serves as the mother church of the diocese and ministers to a substantial local congregation. At the Dissolution the veneration of St Etheldreda was suppressed, her shrine in the cathedral was destroyed, and the dedication of the cathedral to her and St Peter was replaced by the present dedication to the Holy and Undivided Trinity. Since 1873 the practice of honouring her memory has been revived, and annual festivals are celebrated, commemorating events in her life and the successive "translations" – removals of her remains to new shrines – which took place in subsequent centuries.

== Dean and chapter ==
As of June 2026:

- Dean – Mark Bonney (since 22 September 2012 installation, retires 31 July 2026)
- Precentor – James Reveley (previously Canon Residentiary) - also Interim Dean from 1 August 2026
- Canon Theologian – Jenny Wright
- Canon Pastor - vacant - Robert Mackley to be installed 20 September 2026

== Burials ==
The burials below are listed in date order

- Æthelthryth – Abbess of Ely in 679. The shrine was destroyed in 1541, her relics are alleged to be in St Etheldreda's Church, Ely Place, London and St Etheldreda's Roman Catholic Church, Ely
- Seaxburh – Abbess of Ely in about 699
- Wihtburh – possible sister of Æthelthryth, founder and abbess of convent in Dereham. Died 743 and buried in the cemetery of Ely Abbey, reinterred in her church in Dereham 798, remains stolen in 974 and buried in Ely Abbey
- Byrhtnoth – patron of Ely Abbey, died leading Anglo-Saxon forces at the Battle of Maldon in 991
- Eadnoth the Younger – Abbot of Ramsey, Bishop of Dorchester, killed in 1016 fighting against Cnut, his body was seized and hidden by Ely monks and subsequently venerated as Saint Eadnoth the Martyr
- Wulfstan II – Archbishop of York (1002–1023), he died in York but according to his wishes he was buried in the monastery of Ely. Miracles are ascribed to his tomb by the Liber Eliensis
- Alfred Aetheling – son of the English king Æthelred the Unready (1012–1037)
- Hervey le Breton – First Bishop of Ely (1109–1131)
- Nigel – Bishop of Ely (1133–1169), may have been buried here
- Geoffrey Ridel – the nineteenth Lord Chancellor of England and Bishop of Ely (1173–1189)
- Eustace – Bishop of Ely (1197–1215), also the twenty-third Lord Chancellor of England and Lord Keeper of the Great Seal. Buried near the altar of St Mary
- John of Fountains – Bishop of Ely (1220–1225), "in the pavement" near the high altar
- Geoffrey de Burgo – Bishop of Ely (1225–1228), buried in north choir but no surviving tomb or monument has been identified as his
- Hugh of Northwold – Bishop of Ely (1229–1254), buried next to a shrine to St Etheldreda in the presbytery that he built, his tomb was moved to the north choir aisle but the location of his remains is unclear
- William of Kilkenny – Lord Chancellor of England and Bishop of Ely (1254–1256), his heart was buried here, having died in Spain on a diplomatic mission for the king
- Hugh de Balsham – Bishop of Ely (1256–1286), founder of Peterhouse, his tomb has not been firmly identified
- John Kirkby – Lord High Treasurer of England and Bishop of Ely (1286–1290), a marble tomb slab located in the north choir aisle may possibly be from his tomb
- William of Louth – Bishop of Ely (1290–1298), his elaborate tomb is near the entrance to the Lady Chapel in the south choir aisle
- John Hotham – Chancellor of the Exchequer, Lord High Treasurer, Lord Chancellor and Bishop of Ely (1316–1337), died after two years of paralysis
- John Barnet – Bishop of Ely (1366–1373)
- Louis II de Luxembourg – Cardinal, Archbishop of Rouen and Bishop of Ely (1437–1443). He is not known to have ever visited the cathedral; after his death at Hatfield his bowels were interred in the church there, his heart at Rouen and his body at Ely on the south side of the Presbytery
- John Tiptoft – 1st Earl of Worcester ('The Butcher of England') (1427–1470), in a large tomb in the South Choir Aisle
- William Grey – Lord High Treasurer of England and Bishop of Ely (1454–1478)
- John Alcock – Lord Chancellor of England and Bishop of Ely (1486–1500), in the Alcock Chantry
- Richard Redman – Bishop of Ely (1501–1505)
- Nicholas West – Bishop of Ely (1515–1534), buried in the Bishop West Chantry Chapel, which he built, at the eastern end of the South Choir Aisle
- Thomas Goodrich – Bishop of Ely (1534–1554), buried in the South Choir
- Robert Steward – First Dean of Ely (1541–1557)
- Richard Cox – Bishop of Ely (1559–1581), buried in a tomb over which the choir box was built
- Martin Heton – Bishop of Ely (1599–1609)
- Humphrey Tyndall – Dean of Ely (1591–1614)
- Henry Caesar – Dean of Ely (1614–1636)
- Benjamin Lany – Bishop of Ely (1667–1675)
- Peter Gunning – Bishop of Ely (1675–1684)
- Simon Patrick – Bishop of Ely (1691–1707)
- William Marsh – Gentleman of Ely (1642–1708), Marble mural erected above the entrance to the Lady Chapel.
- John Moore – Bishop of Ely (1707–1714)
- William Fleetwood – Bishop of Ely (1714–1723), in the north chancel aisle
- Robert Moss – Dean of Ely (1713–1729)
- Thomas Green – Bishop of Ely (1723–1738)
- Robert Butts – Bishop of Ely (1738–1748)
- Matthias Mawson – Bishop of Ely (1754–1771)
- Edmund Keene – Bishop of Ely (1771–1781), in the Bishop West Chantry Chapel (his wife, Mary, was buried in the south side of the choir)
- Bowyer Sparke – Bishop of Ely (1812–1836), in the Bishop West Chantry Chapel
- George Basevi – Architect. Died 1845, aged 51, after falling through an opening in the floor of the old bell chamber of the west tower of Ely Cathedral while inspecting repairs. Buried in North Choir Aisle under a monumental brass
- Joseph Allen – Bishop of Ely (1836–1845)
- William Hodge Mill (1792–1853) – the first principal of Bishop's College, Calcutta, and later Regius Professor of Hebrew at Cambridge and Canon at Ely Cathedral
- James Woodford – Bishop of Ely (1873–1885), in Matthew Wren's chapel on the south side of the choir
- Harry Legge-Bourke – died 1973 while Member of Parliament for the Isle of Ely

== Music ==
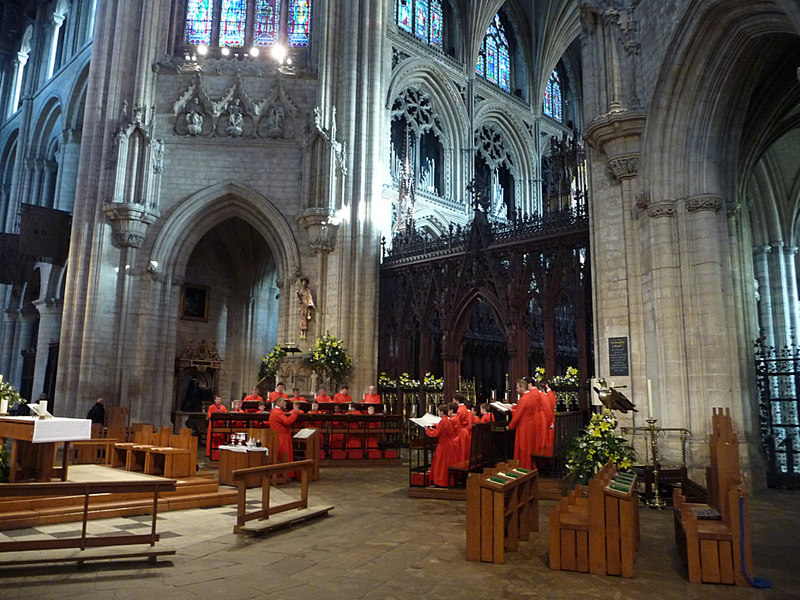
Choir practice

The cathedral retains six professional adult lay clerks who sing in the Cathedral Choir along with boy and girl choristers aged 7 to 13 who receive choristerships funded by the cathedral to attend the King's Ely school as day or boarding pupils. From 2021, boy and girl choristers sing an equal number of services, and receive an equal scholarship off of school fees at King's Ely. The director of music leads the boy choristers, and the girl choristers are led by Sarah MacDonald.

The Octagon Singers and Ely Imps are voluntary choirs of local adults and children respectively.

=== Organ ===
Details of the organ from the National Pipe Organ Register

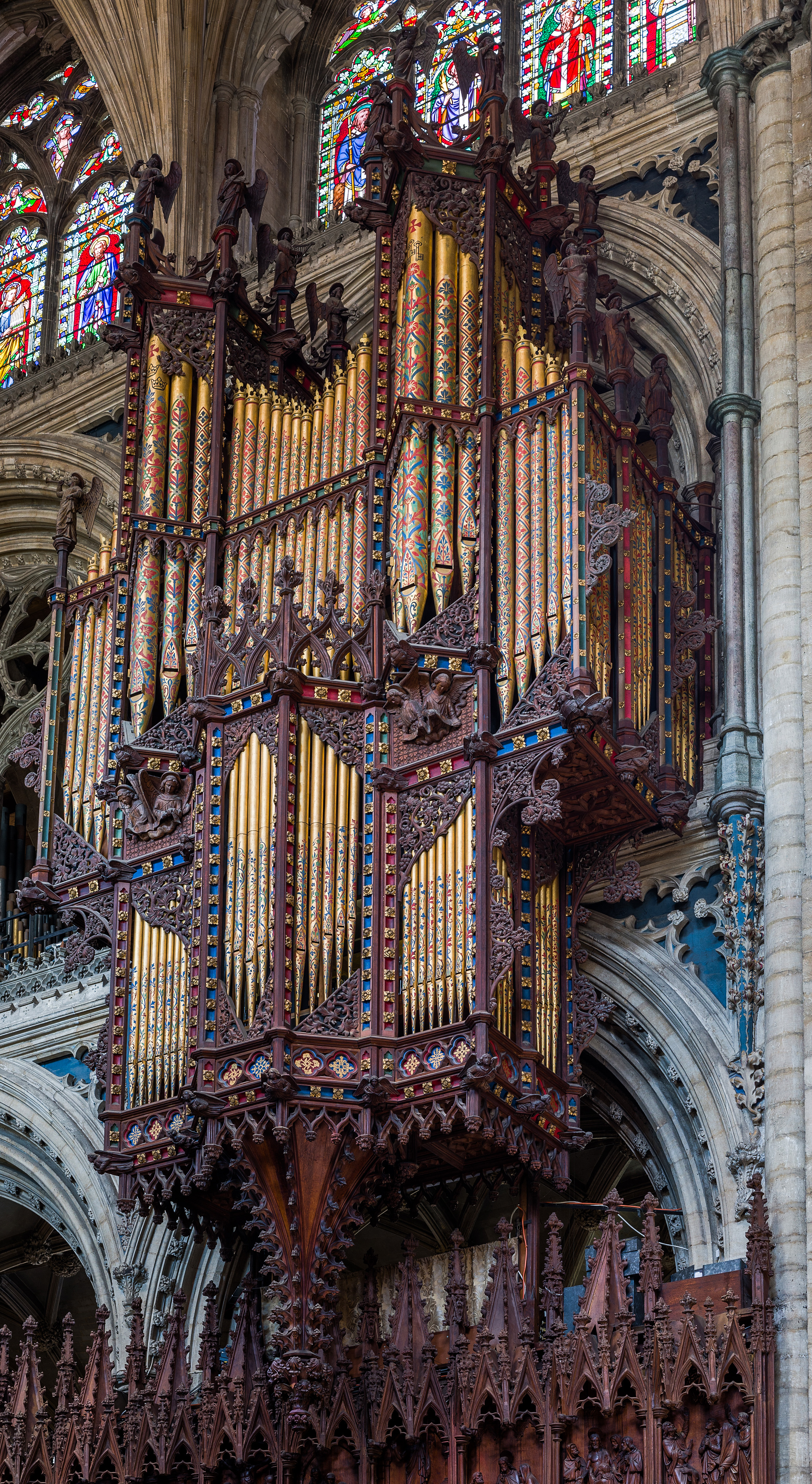
Organ pipes

=== Organists ===
The following is a list of organists recorded since the cathedral was refounded in 1541 following the Second Act of Dissolution. Where not directly appointed as organist, the position is inferred by virtue of their appointment as master of the choristers, or most recently as director of music.

- William Smith 1541–1542
- Christopher Tye 1542–1561
- Robert Whyte c. 1561−1566
- John Farrant 1566–1570
- William Fox 1571–1579
- George Barcroft 1580–1610
- John Amner 1610–1641
- Robert Claxton 1641–1662
- John Ferrabosco 1663–1682
- James Hawkins 1682–1729
- Thomas Kempton 1729–1762
- John Elbonn 1762–1768
- David Wood 1768–1774
- James Rodgers 1774–1777
- Richard Langdon 1777–1778
- Highmore Skeats 1778–1803
- Highmore Skeats 1803–1830
- Robert Janes 1830–1866
- Edmund Chipp 1866–1886
- Basil Harwood 1887–1892
- T. Tertius Noble 1892–1898
- Hugh Allen 1898–1900
- Archibald Wayett Wilson 1901–1919
- Noel Edmund Ponsonby 1919–1926
- Hubert Stanley Middleton 1926–1931
- Marmaduke Conway 1931–1949
- Sidney Campbell 1949–1953
- Michael Howard 1953–1958
- Arthur Wills 1958–1990
- Paul Trepte 1990–2019
- Edmund Aldhouse 2019−incumbent

== Stained Glass Museum ==
The south triforium is home to the Stained Glass Museum, a designated collection of stained glass from the thirteenth century to the present day that is of national importance and includes works from notable contemporary artists including Ervin Bossanyi.

== In popular culture ==
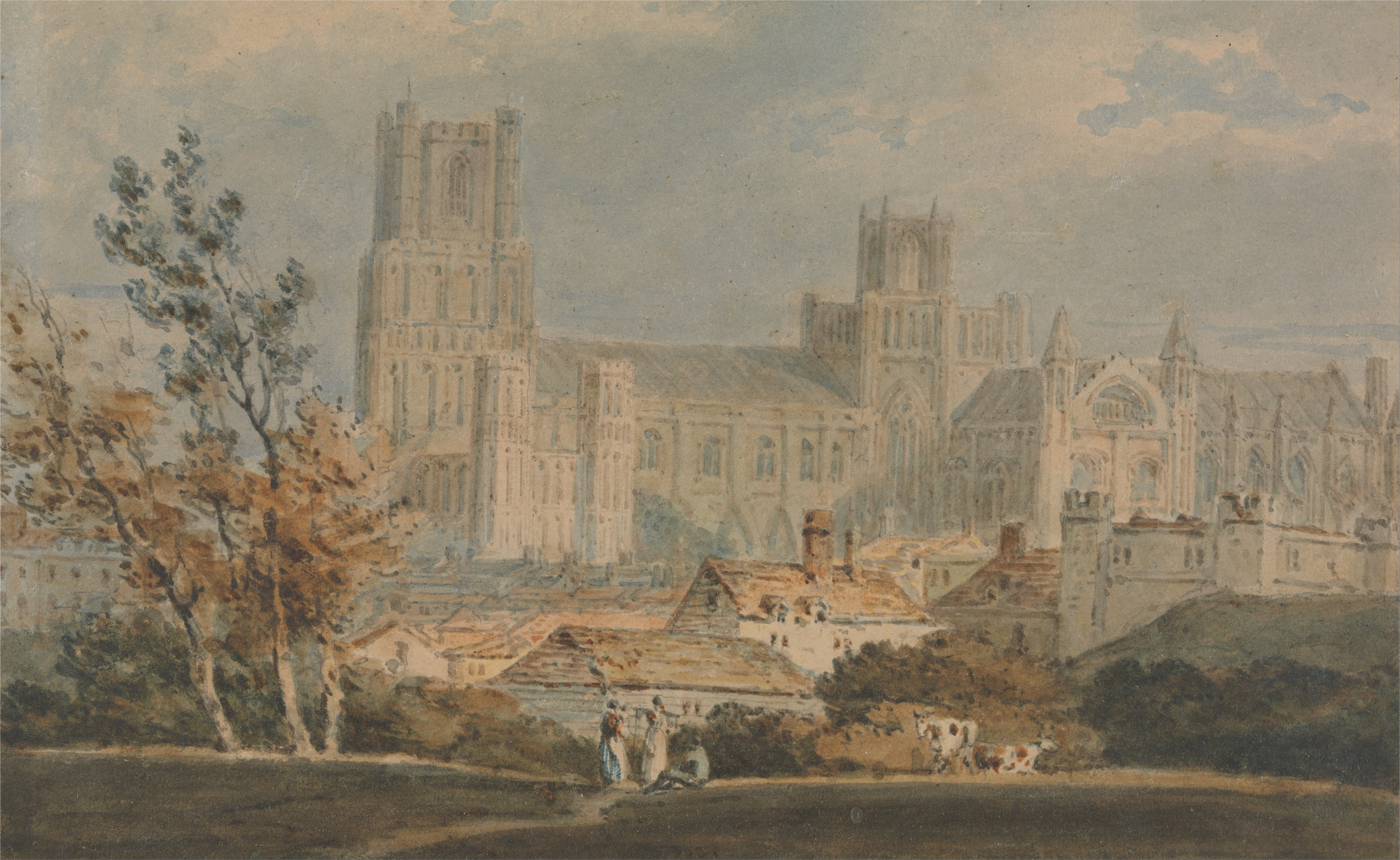
View of Ely Cathedral, J. M. W. Turner (circa 1796), Yale Center for British Art

- The cathedral was the subject of a watercolour by J. M. W. Turner, in about 1796.
- The cathedral appears on the horizon in the cover photo of Pink Floyd's 1994 album The Division Bell, and in the music video of a single from that album, "High Hopes".
  - Pink Floyd's David Gilmour recorded orchestral and choral parts for his 2024 album Luck and Strange at the cathedral.
- In 1973 Leonard Bernstein and the London Symphony Orchestra filmed and recorded a performance of the Symphony No. 2 'Resurrection' by Gustav Mahler in Ely Cathedral. The vocal parts were sung by Sheila Armstrong, Dame Janet Baker and the Edinburgh Festival Chorus.
- The covers of a number of John Rutter's choral albums feature an image of the cathedral, a reference to early recordings of his music being performed and recorded in the Lady chapel.
- Direct references to the cathedral appear in the children's book Tom's Midnight Garden by Philippa Pearce. A full-length movie with the same title was released in 1999.
- A section of the film Elizabeth: The Golden Age was filmed at the cathedral in June 2006.
- Filming for The Other Boleyn Girl took place at the cathedral in August 2007.
- Parts of Marcus Sedgwick's 2000 novel Floodland take place at the cathedral after the sea has consumed the land around it, turning Ely into an island.
- Direct references to Ely Cathedral are made in Jill Dawson's 2006 novel Watch Me Disappear.
- A week's filming took place in November 2009 at the cathedral, when it substituted for Westminster Abbey in The King's Speech.
- In April 2013 Mila Kunis was at the cathedral filming Jupiter Ascending.
- In 2013, in the movie Snowpiercer, the west tower appeared in a collection of frozen ruined man-made structures in the dystopian future when a view of the outside world was briefly shown as the train Snowpiercer was encircling the globe.
- The film Assassin's Creed shot scenes in Ely Cathedral in July 2013.
- The film Macbeth used the cathedral for filming in February and March 2014.
- In 2016 the cathedral was substituted for Westminster Abbey again in the Netflix original series The Crown.
- Shooting for the 2023 film Maestro took place at the cathedral between October 20 and 22, 2022
- It features in the L. P. Hartley novel Facial Justice as one of the few structure that remain standing after World War 3.

== See also ==
- List of cathedrals in the United Kingdom
- Architecture of the medieval cathedrals of England
- English Gothic architecture
- Ely Eel Day
- Ely Inquiry
- William Selwyn — canon and astronomer
- Hennepin Avenue United Methodist Church — a 1916 church in Minneapolis, Minnesota, USA, modeled after Ely Cathedral
- Walter Frye
- Late medieval domes
- List of Gothic Cathedrals in Europe
- List of tallest structures built before the 20th century
- Lands and Liberties of the Church at Ely
- Sextry Barn, Ely
