= William Hurley (carpenter) =

14th century English carpenter

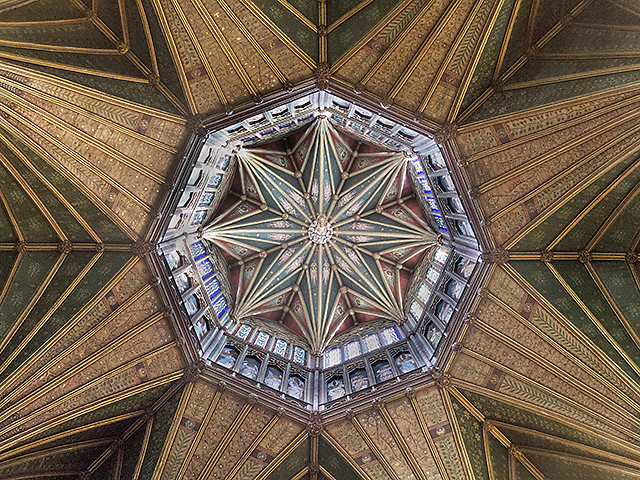
The interior of the octagon at Ely Cathedral

William Hurley (known works 1319–1354) held the title of king's master carpenter for King Edward III of England.

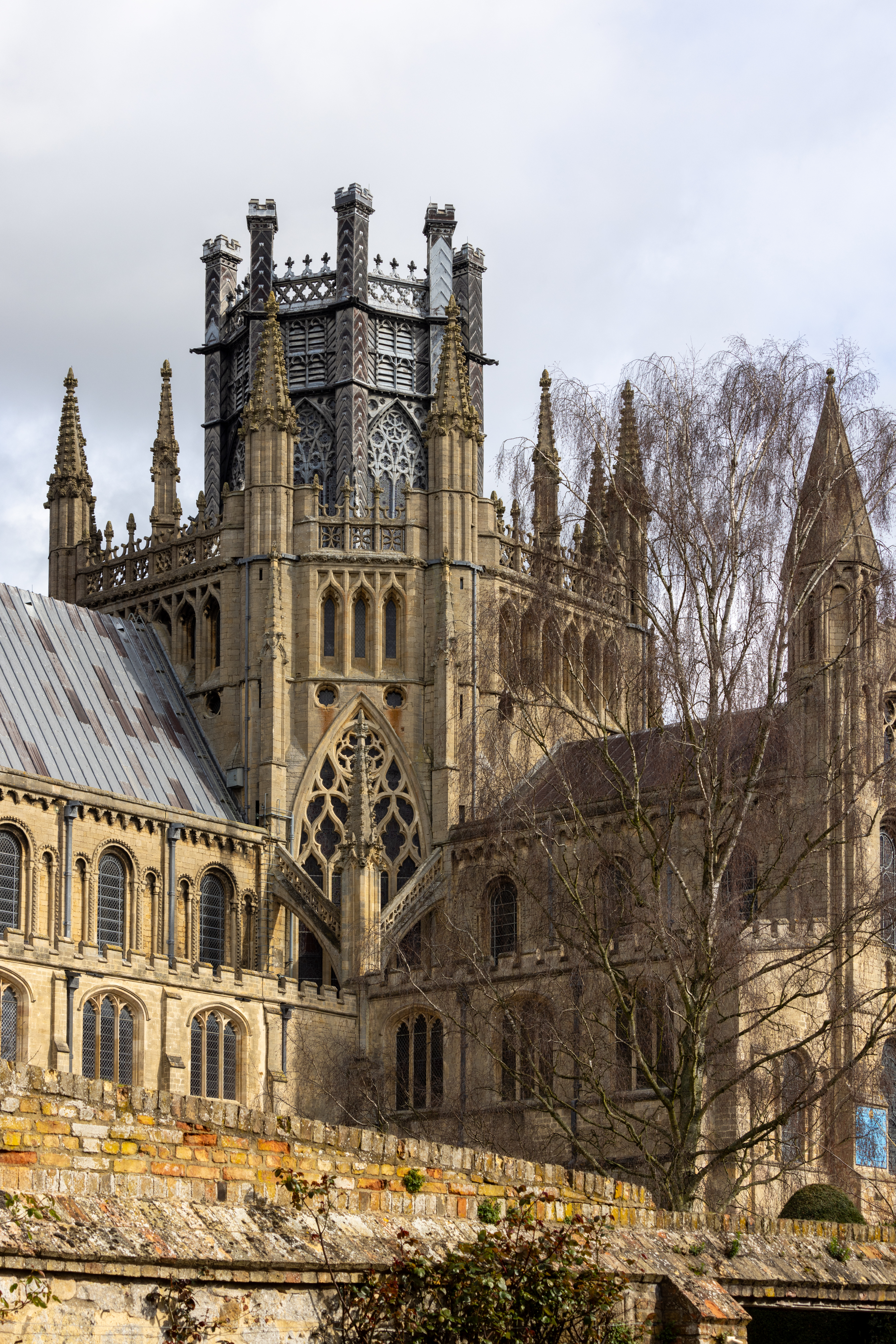
The exterior of the octagon at Ely

Hurley came from Hurley in Berkshire. He was in charge of timber works for all royal buildings, including the Tower of London, Windsor Castle, the Palace of Westminster and St Stephen's Chapel. He is best known for the lantern tower on top of the octagon at Ely Cathedral, following the collapse of the Norman central tower in 1322. Hurley was first documented in connection with this work in 1334, and continued to appear in the Ely records until his death in 1354. Hurley worked with the Sacrist, Alan of Walsingham (who appears to have had the general conception of the building) and a mason known as 'John Cementarius', whose identity is unclear. The tower has two timber tierceron vaults, possibly inspired by that over the chapter house of York Minster. The timber lantern is rotated above the masonry octagon (such that each vertex of the lantern sits above a midpoint of the octagon) and is carried by a concealed timber structure incorporating hammerbeams, possibly the first used at a large scale.
