= Robert Janes =

English organist

Robert Janes (1806–1866) was the organist of Ely Cathedral from 1830 until his death in 1866 (aged 59).

Janes attended Dulwich College studying as a chorister, then at the age of 14, he was articled to the renowned choir trainer and organist of Norwich Cathedral Zechariah Buck, becoming his first pupil.

Shortly after his appointment to Ely, he oversaw the replacement of the cathedral's greatly deficient organ with a new one by Elliot & Hill.

The choral service at Ely was in a sorry state on his arrival, with no rehearsals and poor attendance by the choir. Janes' efforts to raise the standards were met with open hostility by the clerical body; his harmonised inflections were declared to be an unpardonable protraction of the length of the service, and he was forced to abandon his design of harmonizing the rest of the Preces and Versicles. His General Confession, however, remained in daily use for some time and was published in 1864 and is known as the "Ely Confession".

He had an amateur interest in printing and was the first to set pointed Anglican chant in print.

== Works ==
- Robert Jane; Organist of Ely Cathedral (1852). The Psalter, Or Psalms of David; together with the Te Deum, Jubilate, Magnificat, Nunc Dimittis, &C. CAREFULLY MARKED AND POINTED, to enable the voices of a Choir to keep exactly together, by singing the same syllable to the same note; and the accents as far as possible made to agree with the accents in the chant; and also to remove the difficulty which individuals generally find who are not accustomed to the chanting of the Psalms.

Cultural offices
Preceded by Highmore Skeats	Organist and Magister Choristarum at Ely Cathedral; 1831	Succeeded by Edmund Chipp
