= List of lord high treasurers of England and Great Britain =

This is a list of lord high treasurers of England and later of Great Britain.

== Early ==
- Nigel, nephew of Roger, Bishop of Salisbury (c. 1126 – 1133)
- Adelelm, nephew of Roger, Bishop of Salisbury (c. 1136 – 1139)

== Plantagenet ==
- Nigel, nephew of Roger, Bishop of Salisbury (c. 1154 – 1158)
- Richard FitzNeal, Dean of Lincoln, Bishop of London (c. 1158 – 1189)
- William of Ely, Archdeacon of Cleveland (1196 – August 1215)
- Eustace of Fauconberg, Bishop of London (4 November 1217 – October 1228)
- Walter Mauclerk, Bishop of Carlisle (13 November 1228 – 14 January 1233)
- Peter des Rivaux, Canon of St. Paul's (14 January 1233 – 1 June 1234)
- Hugh de Pateshull, Bishop of Coventry (1 June 1234 – March 1240)
- William Haverhill, Canon of Lichfield (March 1240 – 23 August 1252)
- Philip Lovel, Archdeacon of Coventry (27 August 1252 – October 1258)
- John Crakehall, Archdeacon of Bedford (2 November 1258 – 10 September 1260)
- John of Caux, Abbot of Peterborough (28 October 1260 – March 1263)
- Nicholas of Ely (6 May – 19 July 1263)
- Henry, Prior of St. Radegund (July – November 1263)
- John Chishull, acting (November 1263)
- Roger de la Leye, acting (30 November 1263 – 3 November 1264)
- Henry, Prior of St. Radegund (3 November 1264 – summer 1265)
- Thomas Wymondham, Preceptor of Lichfield (23 October 1265 – 6 February 1270)
- John Chishull (6 February 1270 – 9 June 1271)
- Philip of Eye, Canon of St. Paul's (16 October 1271 – 2 October 1273)
- Sir Joseph of Chauncy, Prior of the Knights of St. John in England (2 October 1273 – 18 June 1280)
- Richard de Ware, Abbot of Westminster (18 June 1280 – 1283)
- John Kirkby, Bishop of Ely (6 January 1284 – 26 March 1290)
- William of March, Bishop of Bath and Wells (6 April 1290 – 16 August 1295)
- John Droxford, acting (16 August – 28 September 1295)
- Walter Langton, Bishop of Coventry and Lichfield (28 September 1295 – 22 August 1307)
- Walter Reynolds, Bishop of Worcester (22 August 1307 – 6 July 1310)
- John Sandall, Provost of Wells (6 July 1310 – 23 October 1311)
- Walter Norwich, acting (23 October 1311 – 23 January 1312)
- Walter Langton, Bishop of Coventry and Lichfield (23 January 1312 – 17 May 1312)
- Walter Norwich, acting (17 May 1312 – 4 October 1312)
- John Sandall, acting (4 October 1312 – 26 September 1314)
- Walter Norwich (26 September 1314 – 27 May 1317)
- John Hotham, Bishop of Ely (27 May 1317 – 10 June 1318)
- John Walwayn, Canon of St. Paul's and Hereford (10 June – 16 November 1318)
- John Sandall, Bishop of Winchester (16 November 1318 – 29 September 1319)
- Walter Norwich, acting (29 September 1319 – 18 February 1320)
- Walter de Stapledon, Bishop of Exeter (18 February 1320 – 25 August 1321)
- Walter Norwich, acting (25 August 1321 – 10 May 1322)
- Walter de Stapledon, Bishop of Exeter (10 May 1322 – 3 July 1325)
- William Melton, Archbishop of York (3 July 1325 – 14 November 1326)
- John de Stratford, Bishop of Winchester (14 November 1326 – 28 January 1327)
- Adam Orleton, Bishop of Hereford (28 January – 28 March 1327)
- Henry Burghersh, Bishop of Lincoln (28 March 1327 – 2 July 1328)
- Thomas Charlton, Bishop of Hereford (2 July 1328 – 16 September 1329)
- Robert Wodehouse, Archdeacon of Richmond (16 September 1329 – 1 December 1330)
- William Melton, Archbishop of York (1 December 1330 – 1 April 1331)
- William Ayermin, Bishop of Norwich (1 April 1331 – 29 March 1332)
- Robert Ayleston, Archdeacon of Berkshire (29 March 1332 – 9 March 1334)
- Richard Bury, Bishop of Durham (9 March – 1 August 1334)
- Henry Burghersh, Bishop of Lincoln (1 August 1334 – 24 March 1337)
- William de la Zouche, Dean of York (24 March 1337 – 10 March 1338)
- Robert Wodehouse, Archdeacon of Richmond (10 March – 31 December 1338)
- William de la Zouche, Dean of York (31 December 1338 – 2 May 1340)
- Sir Robert Sadington (2 May – 26 June 1340)
- Roger Northburgh, Bishop of Coventry and Lichfield (26 June – 1 December 1340)
- Sir Robert Parning (15 January – 30 October 1341)
- William Cusance (30 October 1341 – 12 April 1344)
- William Edington, Bishop of Winchester (12 April 1344 – 29 November 1356)
- John Sheppey, Bishop of Rochester (29 November 1356 – 19 October 1360)
- Simon Langham, Bishop of Ely (23 November 1360 – 20 February 1363)
- John Barnet, Bishop of Bath and Wells, later Bishop of Ely (20 February 1363 – 27 June 1369)
- Thomas Brantingham, Bishop of Exeter (27 June 1369 – 27 March 1371)
- Richard Scrope, 1st Baron Scrope of Bolton (27 March 1371 – 26 September 1375)
- Sir Robert Assheton (26 September 1375 – 14 January 1377)
- Henry Wakefield, Bishop of Worcester (14 January 1377 – 19 July 1377)
- Thomas Brantingham, Bishop of Exeter (19 July 1377 – 1 February 1381)
- Sir Robert Hales, Prior of the Order of St. John in England (1 February – 14 June 1381)
- Sir Hugh Segrave (10 August 1381 – 17 January 1386)
- John Fordham, Bishop of Durham (17 January – 24 October 1386)
- John Gilbert, Bishop of Hereford (24 October 1386 – 4 May 1389)
- Thomas Brantingham (4 May – 20 August 1389)
- John Gilbert, Bishop of St David's (20 August 1389 – 2 May 1391)
- John Waltham, Bishop of Salisbury (2 May 1391 – 17 September 1395)
- Roger Walden, Archbishop of Canterbury (20 September 1395 – 22 January 1398)
- Guy Mone, Bishop of St. David's (22 January 1398 – 17 September 1398)
- William Scrope, 1st Earl of Wiltshire (17 September 1398 – 30 July 1399)

== Lancaster and York ==
- Sir John Norbury (3 September 1399 – 31 May 1401)
- Laurence Allerthorp, Canon of London, Dean of Wolverhampton (31 May 1401 – 27 February 1402)
- Henry Bowet, Bishop of Bath and Wells (27 February – 25 October 1402)
- Guy Mone, Bishop of St. David's (25 October 1402 – 9 September 1403)
- William de Ros, 6th Baron de Ros (9 September 1403 – 5 December 1404)
- Thomas Nevill, 5th Baron Furnivall (5 December 1404 – 14 March 1407)
- Nicholas Bubwith, Bishop of London (15 April 1407 – 14 July 1408)
- Sir John Tiptoft (14 July 1408 – 6 January 1410)
- Henry Scrope, 3rd Baron Scrope of Masham (6 January 1410 – 20 December 1411)
- Sir John Pelham (23 December 1411 – 21 March 1413)
- Thomas FitzAlan, 12th Earl of Arundel (21 March 1413 – 13 October 1415)
- Sir Hugh Mortimer (10 January – 13 April 1416)
- Sir Roger Leche (17 April – 23 November 1416)
- Henry FitzHugh, 3rd Baron FitzHugh (6 December 1416 – 26 February 1421)
- William Kinwolmarsh, Dean of St. Martin's le-Grand (26 February 1421 – 18 December 1422)
- John Stafford, Bishop of Bath and Wells (18 December 1422 – 16 March 1426)
- Walter Hungerford, 1st Baron Hungerford (16 March 1426 – 26 February 1432)
- John Scrope, 4th Baron Scrope of Masham (26 February 1432 – 11 August 1433)
- Ralph de Cromwell, 3rd Baron Cromwell (11 August 1433 – 7 July 1443)
- Ralph Boteler, 1st Baron Sudeley (7 July 1443 – 18 December 1446)
- Marmaduke Lumley, Bishop of Carlisle (18 December 1446 – 16 September 1449)
- James Fiennes, 1st Baron Saye and Sele (16 September 1449 – 22 June 1450)
- John Beauchamp, 1st Baron Beauchamp of Powick (22 June 1450 – 15 April 1452)
- John Tiptoft, 1st Earl of Worcester (15 April 1452 – 15 March 1455)
- James Butler, 5th Earl of Ormond and 1st Earl of Wiltshire (15 March – 29 May 1455)
- Henry Bourchier, 1st Viscount Bourchier (29 May 1455 – 5 October 1456), later created Earl of Essex
- John Talbot, 2nd Earl of Shrewsbury (5 October 1456 – 30 October 1458)
- James Butler, 5th Earl of Ormond and 1st Earl of Wiltshire (30 October 1458 – 28 July 1460)
- Henry Bourchier, 1st Viscount Bourchier, 1st Earl of Essex (28 July 1460 – 1461)
- John Tiptoft, 1st Earl of Worcester (14 April 1462 – 24 June 1463)
- Edmund Grey, 4th Baron Grey de Ruthin (24 June 1463 – 24 November 1464)
- Walter Blount, 1st Baron Mountjoy (24 November 1464 – 1465)
- Richard Woodville, 1st Earl Rivers (4 March 1466 – 12 August 1469)
- Sir John Langstrother (16 August – 25 October 1469)
- William Grey, Bishop of Ely (25 October 1469 – 10 July 1470)
- John Tiptoft, 1st Earl of Worcester (10 July – 18 October 1470)
- Sir John Langstrother (20 October 1470 – 22 April 1471)
- Henry Bourchier, 1st Viscount Bourchier, 1st Earl of Essex (22 April 1471 – 4 April 1483)
- Sir John Wood (17 May 1483 – 20 August 1484)
- John Tuchet, 6th Baron Audley (6 December 1484 – August 1485)

== Tudor ==
- John Dynham, 1st Baron Dynham (14 July 1486 – 16 June 1501)
- Thomas Howard, 2nd Duke of Norfolk (16 June 1501 – 4 December 1522)
- Thomas Howard, 3rd Duke of Norfolk (4 December 1522 – 12 December 1546)
- Edward Seymour, 1st Duke of Somerset (10 February 1547 – 10 October 1549)
- William Paulet, 1st Marquess of Winchester (3 February 1550 – 10 March 1572)
- William Cecil, 1st Baron Burghley (July 1572 – 4 August 1598)
- Thomas Sackville, 1st Earl of Dorset (15 May 1599 – 19 April 1608)

== Stuart ==
=== 1603–1649 ===
- Robert Cecil, 1st Earl of Salisbury (4 May 1608 – 17 June 1612)
- Commission of the Treasury (17 June 1612 – 24 June 1613)
  - Henry Howard, 1st Earl of Northampton, First Lord
  - Thomas Howard, 1st Earl of Suffolk
  - Edward Somerset, 4th Earl of Worcester
  - Edward la Zouche, 11th Baron Zouche
  - Edward Wotton, 1st Baron Wotton
  - Sir Julius Caesar (Chancellor of the Exchequer)
- Commission of the Treasury (24 June 1613 – 11 July 1614)
  - Thomas Egerton, 1st Baron Ellesmere, First Lord
- Thomas Howard, 1st Earl of Suffolk (11 July 1614 – 1618)
- Commission of the Treasury (July 1618 – 14 December 1620)
  - George Abbot, Archbishop of Canterbury, First Lord
  - Francis Bacon, 1st Baron Verulam
  - Sir Robert Naunton
  - Sir Fulke Greville (Chancellor of the Exchequer)
  - Sir Julius Caesar
  - Sir Edward Coke
- Henry Montagu, 1st Viscount Mandeville (14 December 1620 – 29 September 1621)
- Lionel Cranfield, 1st Earl of Middlesex (29 September 1621 – 25 April 1624)
- James Ley, 1st Earl of Marlborough (11 December 1624 – 15 July 1628)
- Richard Weston, 1st Earl of Portland (15 July 1628 – 1635)
- Commission of the Treasury (15 March 1635 – 6 March 1636)
  - William Laud, Archbishop of Canterbury, First Lord
  - Henry Montagu, 1st Earl of Manchester
  - Francis Cottington, 1st Baron Cottington
  - Sir John Coke
  - Sir Francis Windebank
- William Juxon, Bishop of London (6 March 1636 – 21 May 1641)
- Commission of the Treasury (21 May 1641 – 3 October 1643)
  - Edward Littleton, 1st Baron Lyttleton of Mounslow, First Lord
  - Henry Montagu, 1st Earl of Manchester
  - Sir John Bankes
  - Edward Barrett, 1st Lord Barrett of Newburgh
  - Sir Henry Vane
- Francis Cottington, 1st Baron Cottington (3 October 1643 – July 1646)

=== 1660–1689 ===
- Commission of the Treasury (19 June – 8 September 1660)
  - Sir Edward Hyde, also Lord Chancellor
  - James Butler, 1st Marquess of Ormonde, also Lord Steward of the Household
  - Sir George Monck, also General of the Forces
  - Thomas Wriothesley, 4th Earl of Southampton
  - John Robartes, 2nd Baron Robartes, also Lord Privy Seal
  - Thomas Colepeper, 2nd Baron Colepeper
  - Sir Edward Montagu
  - Sir Edward Nicholas, principal Secretary of State
  - Sir William Morice, principal Secretary of State
- Thomas Wriothesley, 4th Earl of Southampton (8 September 1660 – 16 May 1667)
- Commission of the Treasury (1 June 1667 – 28 November 1672)
  - George Monck, 1st Duke of Albemarle, First Lord (until 3 January 1670)
  - Anthony Ashley-Cooper, 1st Baron Ashley, also Chancellor of the Exchequer
  - Sir Thomas Clifford, Comptroller of the Household
  - Sir William Coventry (until 8 April 1669)
  - Sir John Duncombe
- Thomas Clifford, 1st Baron Clifford of Chudleigh (28 November 1672 – 24 June 1673)
- Thomas Osborne, 1st Viscount Latimer (1st Earl of Danby from 1674) (24 June 1673 – 26 March 1679)
- Commission of the Treasury (26 March – 21 November 1679)
  - Arthur Capell, 1st Earl of Essex, First Lord
  - Laurence Hyde
  - Sir John Ernle, also Chancellor of the Exchequer
  - Sir Edward Dering, 2nd Baronet
  - Sidney Godolphin
- Commission of the Treasury (21 November 1679 – 9 September 1684)
  - Laurence Hyde, 1st Earl of Rochester, First Lord
  - Sir John Ernle, also Chancellor of the Exchequer
  - Sir Edward Dering, 2nd Baronet (until 9 July 1684)
  - Sidney Godolphin (until 9 July 1684)
  - Sir Stephen Fox
  - Sir Dudley North (since 26 July 1684)
  - Henry Frederick Thynne (since 26 July 1684)
- Commission of the Treasury (9 September 1684 – 16 February 1685)
  - Sidney Godolphin, 1st Baron Godolphin, First Lord
  - Sir John Ernle, also Chancellor of the Exchequer
  - Sir Stephen Fox
  - Sir Dudley North
  - Henry Frederick Thynne
- Laurence Hyde, 1st Earl of Rochester (16 February 1685 – 10 December 1686)
- Commission of the Treasury (4 January 1687 – 9 April 1689)
  - John Belasyse, 1st Baron Belasyse, First Lord
  - Sidney Godolphin, 1st Baron Godolphin
  - Henry Jermyn, 1st Baron Dover
  - Sir John Ernle, also Chancellor of the Exchequer
  - Sir Stephen Fox

=== 1689–1714 ===
- Commission of the Treasury (9 April 1689 – 18 March 1690)
  - Charles Mordaunt, 1st Earl of Monmouth, First Lord
  - Henry Booth, 2nd Baron Delamere, also Chancellor of the Exchequer
  - Sidney Godolphin, 1st Baron Godolphin
  - Sir Henry Capell
  - Richard Hampden
- Commission of the Treasury (18 March 1690 – 15 November 1690)
  - Sir John Lowther, MP for Westmorland, First Lord
  - Richard Hampden, also Chancellor of the Exchequer
  - Sir Stephen Fox
  - Thomas Pelham
- Commission of the Treasury (15 November 1690 – 1 May 1697)
  - Sidney Godolphin, 1st Baron Godolphin, First Lord
  - Sir John Lowther (until 21 March 1692)
  - Richard Hampden (until 2 May 1696), also Chancellor of the Exchequer (until 3 May 1694)
  - Sir Stephen Fox
  - Charles Montagu, also Chancellor of the Exchequer (since 3 May 1694)
  - Sir Edward Seymour, 4th Baronet (until 2 May 1696)
  - Sir William Trumbull (3 May 1694 – 1 November 1695)
  - John Smith MP for Bere Alston (since 3 May 1694)
  - Sir Thomas Littleton (since 2 May 1696)
- Commission of the Treasury (1 May 1697 – 15 November 1699)
  - Charles Montagu, MP for Westminster, First Lord, also Chancellor of the Exchequer
  - Sir Stephen Fox
  - Sir Thomas Littleton, 3rd Baronet, MP for Woodstock (until 1 June 1699)
  - Thomas Pelham, MP for Lewes (until 1 June 1699)
  - Ford Grey, 1st Earl of Tankerville (since 1 June 1699)
  - John Smith, MP for Andover (since 1 June 1699)
  - Henry Boyle, MP for Cambridge University (since 1 June 1699)
- Commission of the Treasury (15 November 1699 – 9 December 1700)
  - Ford Grey, 1st Earl of Tankerville, First Lord
  - John Smith, MP for Andover, also Chancellor of the Exchequer
  - Sir Stephen Fox, MP for Cricklade
  - Richard Hill
  - Henry Boyle, MP for Cambridge University
- Commission of the Treasury (9 December 1700 – 30 December 1701)
  - Sidney Godolphin, 1st Lord Godolphin, First Lord
  - John Smith, MP for Andover, also Chancellor of the Exchequer (until March 1701)
  - Sir Stephen Fox, MP for Cricklade
  - Henry Boyle, MP for Cambridge University, also Chancellor of the Exchequer since March 1701
  - Richard Hill
  - Thomas Pelham, MP for Lewes (since March 1701)
- Commission of the Treasury (30 December 1701 – 8 May 1702)
  - Charles Howard, 3rd Earl of Carlisle, First Lord
  - Henry Boyle, MP for Cambridge University, also Chancellor of the Exchequer
  - Sir Stephen Fox, MP for Cricklade
  - Richard Hill
  - Thomas Pelham, MP for Lewes
- Sidney Godolphin, 1st Earl of Godolphin (8 May 1702 – 11 August 1710)
- Commission of the Treasury (11 August 1710 – 30 May 1711)
  - John Poulett, 1st Earl Poulett (First Lord)
  - Robert Harley, MP for Radnor until 23 May 1711, then 1st Earl of Oxford and Mortimer, also Chancellor of the Exchequer
  - Henry Paget, MP for Staffordshire
  - Sir Thomas Mansel, 5th Baronet, MP for Glamorganshire
  - Robert Benson, MP for York
- Robert Harley, 1st Earl of Oxford and Mortimer (30 May 1711 – 30 July 1714)
- Charles Talbot, 1st Duke of Shrewsbury (30 July – 13 October 1714)

For later officers of the treasury, see List of lords commissioners of the Treasury.
