= Stapledon =

Stapledon may refer to:

== People ==
- George Stapledon, Grassland scientist and environmentalist
- Olaf Stapledon, British philosopher and author of several works of science fiction.
- Walter Stapledon, English bishop, brother of Richard
- Richard Stapledon, English judge, brother of Walter

== Places ==
- Stapledon, Ontario, Canada, a small rural village west of Richmond
