= Vita Edwardi Secundi =

1325 Latin chronicle

The Vita Edwardi Secundi (Life of Edward II) is a Latin chronicle by an unknown English medieval historian contemporary to Edward II, who was king of England from 1307 to 1327. It covers the period from 1307 until its abrupt end in 1325 and may have been written in intervals during Edward's reign.

== Manuscript ==
The earliest surviving version of the Vita is a copy made by Thomas Hearne in 1729 from a manuscript lent to him by James West. The original is thought to have been burnt some years later along with many of West's other papers. The manuscript is known to have come from the Benedictine Abbey of Malmesbury, but it is not known if the work was written there.

== Authorship ==
The author is unknown, but aspects of his character can be inferred from his work. He was a highly educated person, shown in his use of biblical quotations and knowledgeable references to the Civil Law of the time. He was likely to have been of advanced age, due to both his apparent death by 1326 and his despair at “the young men of today.”

In 1969, Noël Denholm-Young put forward the proposition that John Walwayn was the author. Walwayn was a lawyer from Herefordshire who was originally a clerk to the Earl of Hereford, but, by 1311, had become an official in the administration of Edward II. Denholm-Young's conclusions are based on the known facts about Walwayn—such as being a king's clerk whose career reached its peak between 1315 and 1323, and who was dead by 1326—matching the interests, knowledge and timeline of the author of the chronicle. However, Antonia Gransden has cast doubt on Denholm-Young's theory and has said that "the evidence seems insufficient to warrant more than a very tentative conclusion, especially as the Vita has nothing about St Paul's and practically nothing on London". W. R. Childs takes a similar view to Gransden but notes that "Walwayn fits a substantial number of the criteria in training, west country connections, and career. If it is not he, then someone with a career very like his is needed to fit the bill".

The most recent theory about the date in which it was written was put forward by Professor C. J. Given-Wilson. He thought the Vita was written at intervals throughout Edward's reign, this is supported by the seeming lack of future knowledge shown by the author at different stages of his work.

== Editions ==
- Noël Denholm-Young, ed. (1957). The Life of Edward the Second, by the So-Called Monk of Malmesbury. London: Nelson.
- W.R. Childs, ed. (2005). Vita Edwardi Secundi. Oxford: Oxford University Press. ISBN 0-19-927594-7.
