= Michael Hart (political scientist) =

Michael William Hart (born 1956) is emeritus Fellow in Politics at Exeter College, Oxford. He was Tutorial Fellow from 1982 until 2024. His research interests include British Politics since 1880 and Modern Southern Africa. He lectures on British politics and government since 1900.

He took his first degree at Emmanuel College, Cambridge, gaining a double First, and then went to the University of Oxford where he gained a doctorate on the decline of the British Liberal Party. He spent some time at Magdalene College, Cambridge as a Junior Research Fellow before taking up his current fellowship. Besides academic positions, he has also served as Junior Proctor in the University of Oxford and as Sub-Rector at Exeter College.

Hart has been quoted on numerous occasions by The Times and The Daily Telegraph during general election periods, campaigned against apartheid in South Africa and has been a Liberal Party councillor on Oxford City Council. Philosophically, he is a liberal, but combines this with a belief in the need for a strong state.
