= Rigaud of Assier =

14th-century Bishop of Winchester

- Bishop of Winchester
- Appointed: 26 November 1319
- Term ended: 12 April 1323
- Predecessor: John Sandale
- Successor: John de Stratford

Orders
- Consecration: 16 November 1320

Personal details
- Died: 12 April 1323
- Denomination: Catholic

Rigaud of Assier was a medieval Bishop of Winchester.

Rigaud was nominated on 26 November 1319 and consecrated on 16 November 1320. He died on 12 April 1323.

== Citations ==
Catholic Church titles
Preceded by John Sandale	Bishop of Winchester; 1319–1323	Succeeded by John de Stratford
