= John Walwayn =

English early 14th century royal official

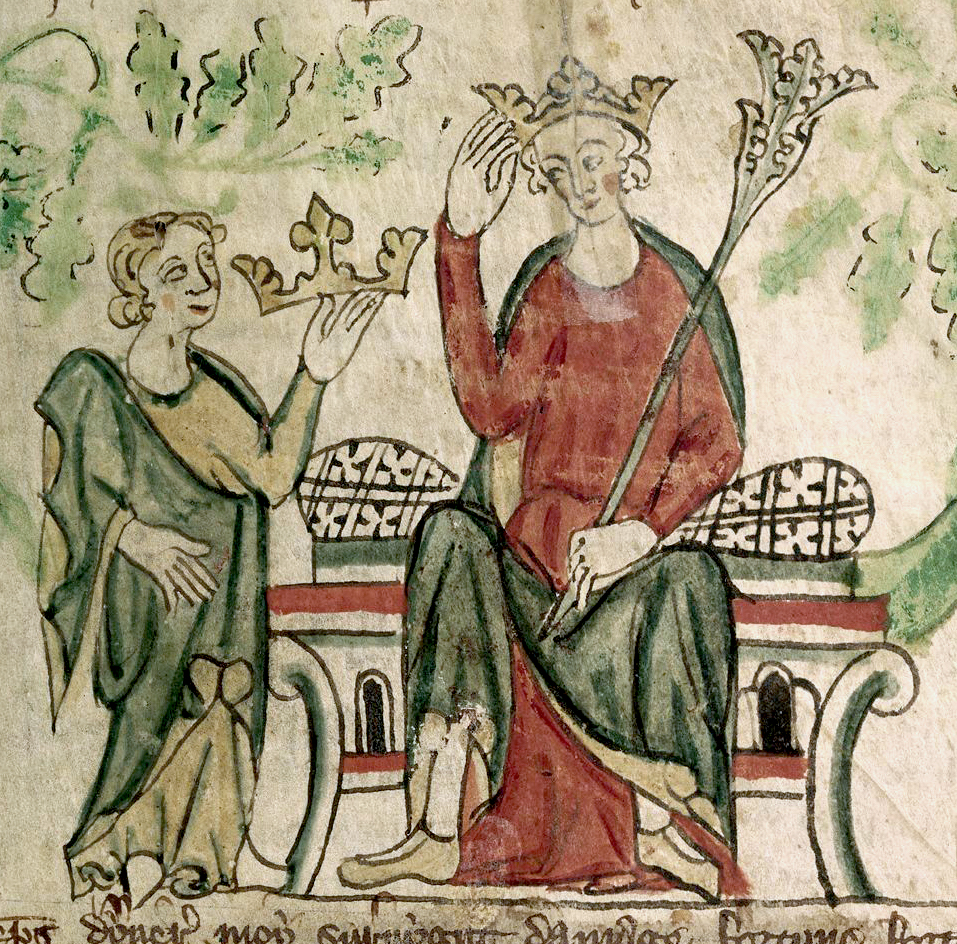
Edward II's coronation from an early 14th-century manuscript held by the British Library

John Walwayn (died between 1324 and 1326) was an English royal official and scholar, and a proposed author of the chronicle known as Vita Edwardi Secundi a partial record of the reign of Edward II.

== Career ==
Walwayn was a "clerk" (which, in medieval England, meant a scholar or administrator) and civil lawyer who entered the service of the Earl of Hereford and became his protégé. He subsequently became a canon of Hereford Cathedral, and of St Paul's Cathedral in London. By 1311, he was employed as a royal clerk and held the office of escheator "south of Trent", that is for the southern half of the country. The escheator was one of two royal officials that managed escheats, the process whereby baronial land reverted to the crown when the owner died without heirs or had been executed as a traitor.

In 1311, he was present during Edward II's campaigning against Robert the Bruce in Scotland. In February of that year, he was mentioned in a letter to the Earl of Richmond: apparently, Walwayn was arrested and imprisoned in Berwick "because he suddenly went towards those parts [the vicinity of Perth] to speak with Robert Bruce". The purpose of his mission is unclear but he may have been sent by Edward to negotiate a place of refuge in Scotland for Edward's favourite, Piers Gaveston. Gaveston had been under attack from the English baronial opposition to Edward. It is possible that Walwayn may have been imprisoned on Edward's orders to prevent the purpose of his mission leaking out.

Walwayn was a candidate in the hotly contested election for Bishop of Durham in 1316, but lost despite the support of the Earl of Hereford. In June 1318, he was appointed the king's Treasurer of the Exchequer, but was removed the following November as part of the purge of "corrupt officials" initiated by the York parliament of that year. In 1324, he made a bid to become Bishop of Hereford, but failed. He retired as escheator in January 1324 and had died by July 1326.

== Authorship of Vita Edwardi Secundi ==
Noël Denholm-Young put forward the view that Walwayn was the author of the anonymous chronicle Vita Edwardi Secundi ("Life of Edward II"), a contemporaneous account of the reign of Edward II which ends abruptly in 1326 shortly before Edward's deposition. Denholm-Young's conclusions are based on the known facts about Walwayn—such as being a king's clerk whose career reached its peak between 1315 and 1323, and who was dead by 1326—matching the interests, knowledge and timeline of the author of the chronicle.

However, Antonia Gransden has cast doubt on Denholm-Young's theory and has said that "the evidence seems insufficient to warrant more than a very tentative conclusion, especially as the Vita has nothing about St Paul's and practically nothing on London". W.R. Childs takes a similar view to Gransden but notes that "Walwayn fits a substantial number of the criteria in training, west country connections, and career. If it is not he, then someone with a career very like his is needed to fit the bill".
