= John Sandale =

14th-century English bishop and court official

- Bishop of Winchester
- Elected: 26 July 1316
- Term ended: 2 November 1319
- Predecessor: Henry Woodlock
- Successor: Rigaud of Assier

Orders
- Consecration: 31 October 1316

Personal details
- Died: 2 November 1319
- Denomination: Catholic

John Sandale (or Sandall) was a Gascon medieval Lord High Treasurer, Lord Chancellor and Bishop of Winchester.

Sandale inherited the manor of Wheatley within Long Sandale, Yorkshire and was granted Free warren in 1301. He also held the manor of Great Coates, Lincolnshire and was granted free warren there in 1313.

Sandale was a canon of Lincoln and St. Paul's and provost of Wells before being appointed Chancellor of the Exchequer in 1307 on the accession of Edward II. He was dismissed the following year for political reasons.

Sandale served as Warden of the Mint from 1298 to 1305, as Lord High Treasurer from 1310 to 1311 and as acting treasurer from 1312 to 1314. He later became Lord Chancellor on 26 September 1314, holding the office until 11 June 1318.

A pluralist, Sandale was at one time chancellor of St Patrick's, Dublin, treasurer of Lichfield, and dean of St Paul's with prebends in Dublin, Beverley, Wells, Lincoln, London, York, and Glasgow, as well as ten rectories from Chalk in Kent to Dunbar in Scotland. He was elected to the see of Winchester 26 July 1316 and consecrated on 31 October 1316. And he was master of the hospital of St Katharine's by the Tower in 1315.

Sandale was again appointed Lord High Treasurer in November 1318 until his death. He died on 2 November 1319 and was buried in St Mary Overie.

== Citations ==
Political offices
| Preceded by Walter Reynolds | Lord Chancellor; 1314–1318 | Succeeded by John Hotham |
| Preceded by Walter Reynolds | Lord High Treasurer; 1310–1311 | Succeeded by Walter Norwich |
| Preceded by Walter Norwich | Lord High Treasurer; 1312–1314 | Succeeded by Walter Norwich |
| Preceded by John Walwayn | Lord High Treasurer; 1318–1319 | Succeeded by Walter Norwich |
Catholic Church titles
| Preceded by Henry Woodlock | Bishop of Winchester; 1316–1319 | Succeeded by Rigaud of Assier |
