= Exeter College, Oxford =

College of the University of Oxford

Exeter College
- University of Oxford
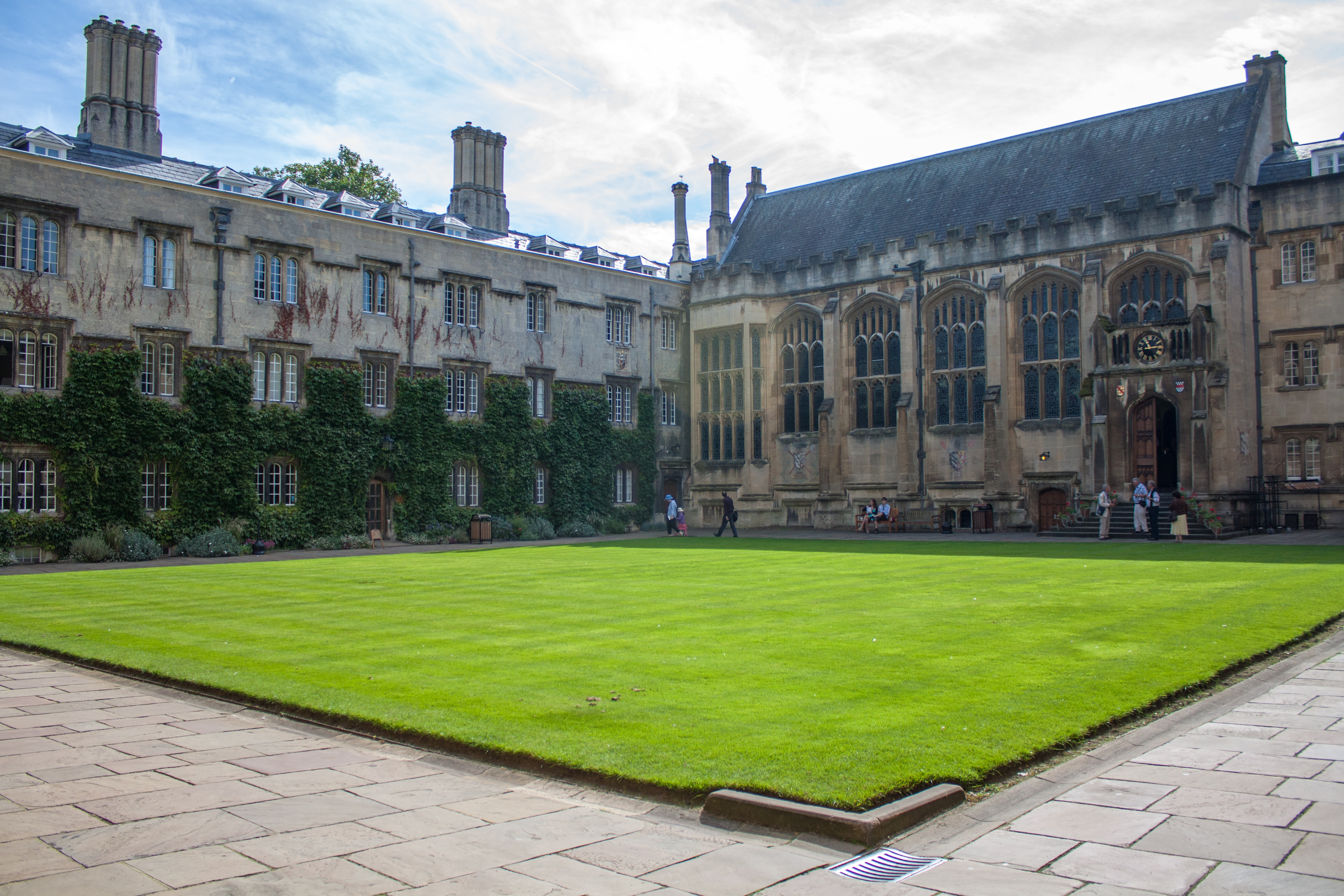

- Arms: Argent, two bends nebuly sable (arms of Stapledon) within a bordure of the last charged with eight pairs of keys, addorsed and interlaced in the rings, the wards upwards, or.
- Location: Turl Street, Oxford OX1 3DP
- Coordinates: 51.753871°N 1.256046°W
- Full name: The Rector and Scholars of Exeter College in the University of Oxford
- Latin name: Collegium Exoniense
- Motto: Latin: Floreat Exon (Let Exeter Flourish)
- Established: 1314; 712 years ago
- Named for: Walter de Stapledon, Bishop of Exeter
- Former names: Stapeldon Hall
- Sister college: Emmanuel College, Cambridge
- Rector: Dr Andrew Roe
- Undergraduates: 375 (2021/2022)
- Postgraduates: 275 (2021/2022)
- Visiting students: 25 (2021/2022)
- Fellows: 56 (2022/2023)
- Endowment: £86.7 million (2022)
- Website: www.exeter.ox.ac.uk
- JCR: JCR
- MCR: MCR
- Boat club: Exeter College Boat Club

Map
- Location within Oxford city centre

Exeter College (in full: The Rector and Scholars of Exeter College in the University of Oxford) is one of the constituent colleges of the University of Oxford in England, and the fourth-oldest college of the university.

The College was founded in 1314 by two brothers from Devon, Bishop Walter Stapledon and Sir Richard Stapledon, as an institution to educate clergy, and has been located on Turl Street since 1315. At its foundation Exeter was popular with sons of the Devon gentry, though it has since become associated with a much broader range of notable alumni, including Raymond Raikes, William Morris, J. R. R. Tolkien, Richard Burton, Roger Bannister, Alan Bennett and Philip Pullman.

== History ==
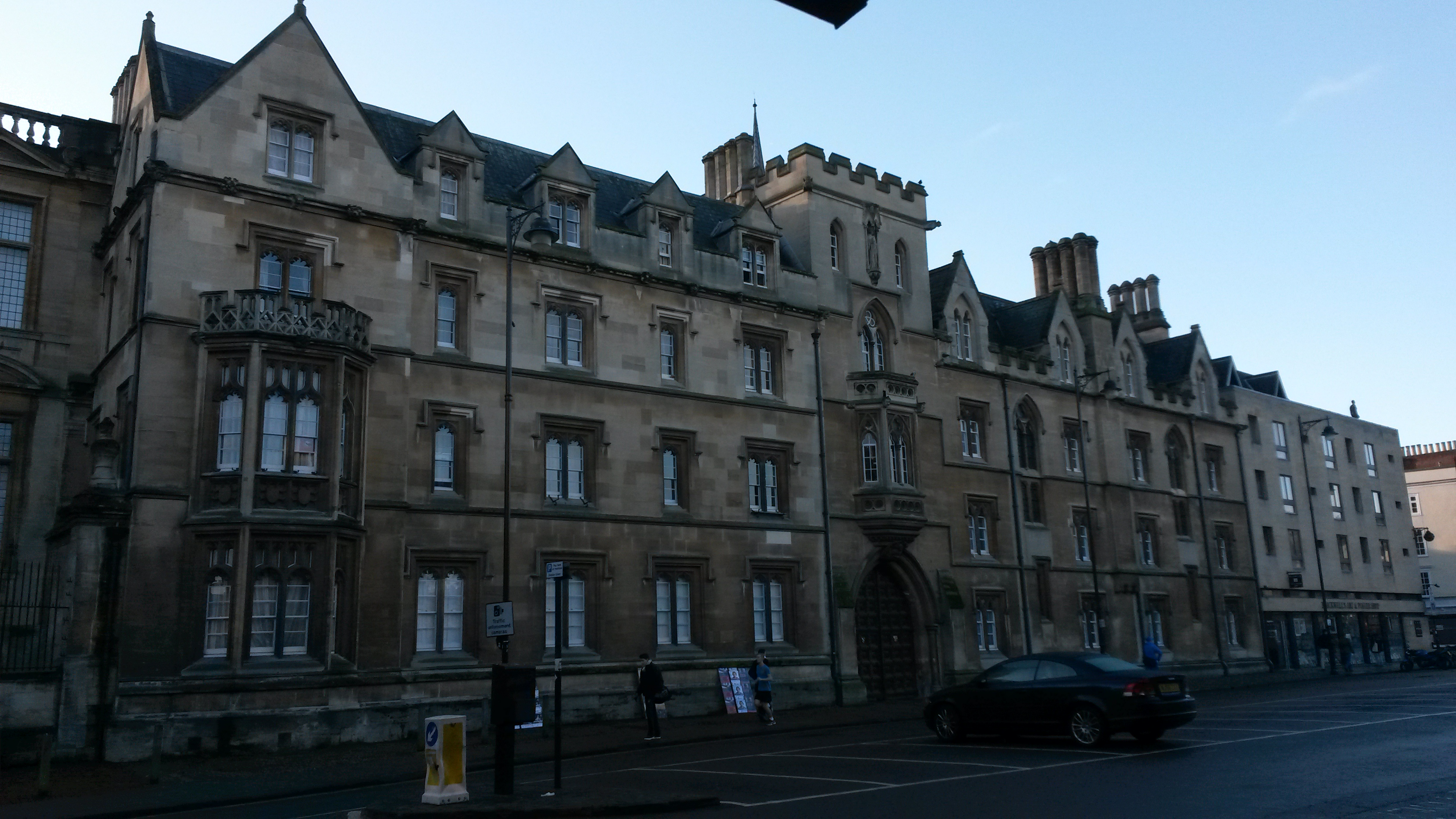
Exeter College's Broad Street frontage

Exeter College was founded in 1314 by Walter Stapledon, Bishop of Exeter and later treasurer to Edward II, and his brother, Sir Richard Stapledon, judge and politician, as a school to educate clergy. The College initially used Hart Hall (now Hertford College) and moved to Turl Street in 1315. During its first century, it was known as Stapledon Hall and was significantly smaller, with just twelve to fourteen students. The College grew significantly from the 15th century onward, and began offering rooms to its students. The College motto is "Floreat Exon.", meaning "Let Exeter Flourish".

In the 16th century, donations from Sir William Petre, assumed to be an Exeter graduate, whose daughter Dorothy Wadham (1534–1618) was a co-founder with her husband Nicholas Wadham (1531–1609) of Wadham College, created the eight Petrean Fellowships, and further contributions from his son John Petre, 1st Baron Petre (1549–1613) helped to expand and transform the College.

Sir John Acland (died 1620), a Devonshire gentleman, donated £800, which largely financed the building of a new dining hall, and also established two scholarships for poor students, the first to be created at the College. In a clever move by the bursar to fill the new buildings as they were completed, a significant number of noble Roman Catholic students were invited to enrol and take classes at the enlarged college; however, they were not allowed to matriculate. As a result, over time, Exeter College became one of the leading colleges in the university.

In the 18th century the College experienced declining popularity, as did all of Oxford's other colleges. University reforms in the 1850s helped to end this period of stagnation.

=== Women at Exeter ===
For over six centuries after its founding, women were not permitted to study at Exeter, but in 1979 it joined many other men's colleges in admitting its first female students. Today it admits men and women in roughly equal numbers. In 1993, Exeter College became the first of the formerly all-male colleges to elect a woman, Marilyn Butler, as its rector. When Butler's tenure expired in October 2004, the College elected another woman—Frances Cairncross, former senior editor of The Economist—as rector.

In 2014, the author J. K. Rowling was elected an honorary fellow of the College for the 'extraordinary contribution she has made to the field of literature, and in particular to children's reading and literacy'.

=== Adelphi Wine Club ===
Formed in the 1850s, the Adelphi Wine Club is reputed to be one of the oldest three wine clubs in Oxford. The club draws its membership from undergraduates studying at Exeter College. It has been forcibly closed down by College authorities several times throughout its tumultuous existence and is currently believed to be dormant. The club was renowned for its extravagant dinners, and for excessive gambling after each meeting. One black ball was sufficient to exclude an undergraduate from membership. Beginning in 1923, the College forbade any student holding an exhibition from joining the club. Notable past members include Sir Martin Le Quesne, and J. P. V. D. Balsdon.

== Buildings ==
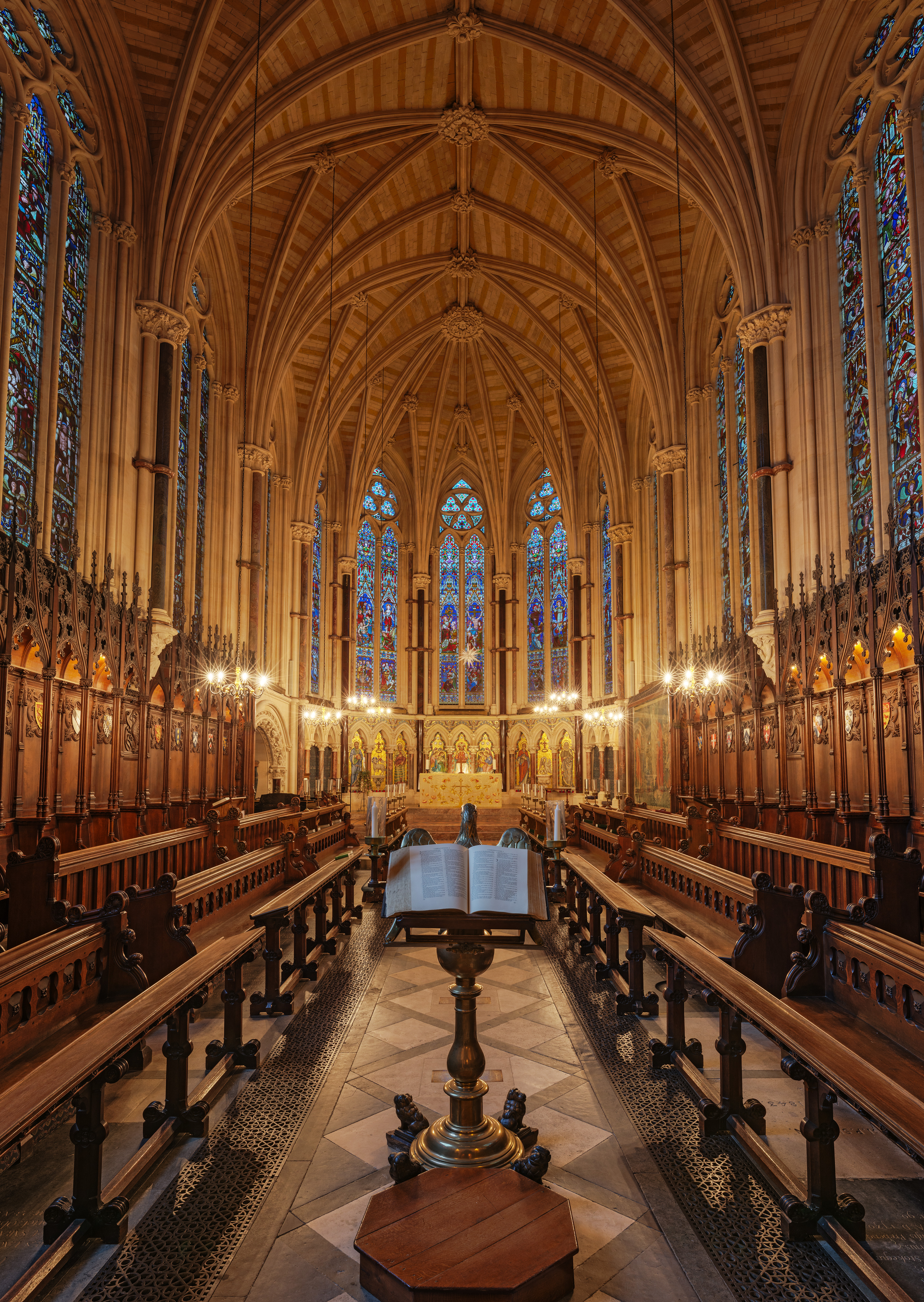
Exeter College Chapel

=== Front Quadrangle ===
The Front Quadrangle sits on roughly the site of the medieval college, although of the earliest buildings, only Palmer's Tower in the north-eastern corner remains. Constructed in 1432, the tower, which was once the primary entrance to the College, now houses various offices and lodgings for fellows, and at its base is a memorial to members who were killed in the Second World War. The quadrangle is dominated by the chapel, designed by Sir George Gilbert Scott and constructed in 1854–1860, which was heavily inspired by the Sainte-Chapelle in Paris. On the opposite side stands the hall, constructed in 1618, notable for its vaulted ceilings and numerous fine portraits, underneath which is the college bar. Building work over the following century resulted in the quadrangle taking on its current appearance in 1710. The Front Quadrangle also houses the Junior, Middle and Senior Common Rooms, as well as lodgings for fellows and undergraduates.

=== Margary Quadrangle ===
The Margary Quadrangle was completed in 1964 with the construction of the Thomas Wood building to commemorate the 650th anniversary of the College and named for Ivan Margary, who paid for its restoration. The quadrangle also incorporates the rector's lodgings, designed by Gilbert Scott and constructed in 1857, and staircases nine, ten and eleven, also erected during the 19th century.

=== Fellows' Garden ===
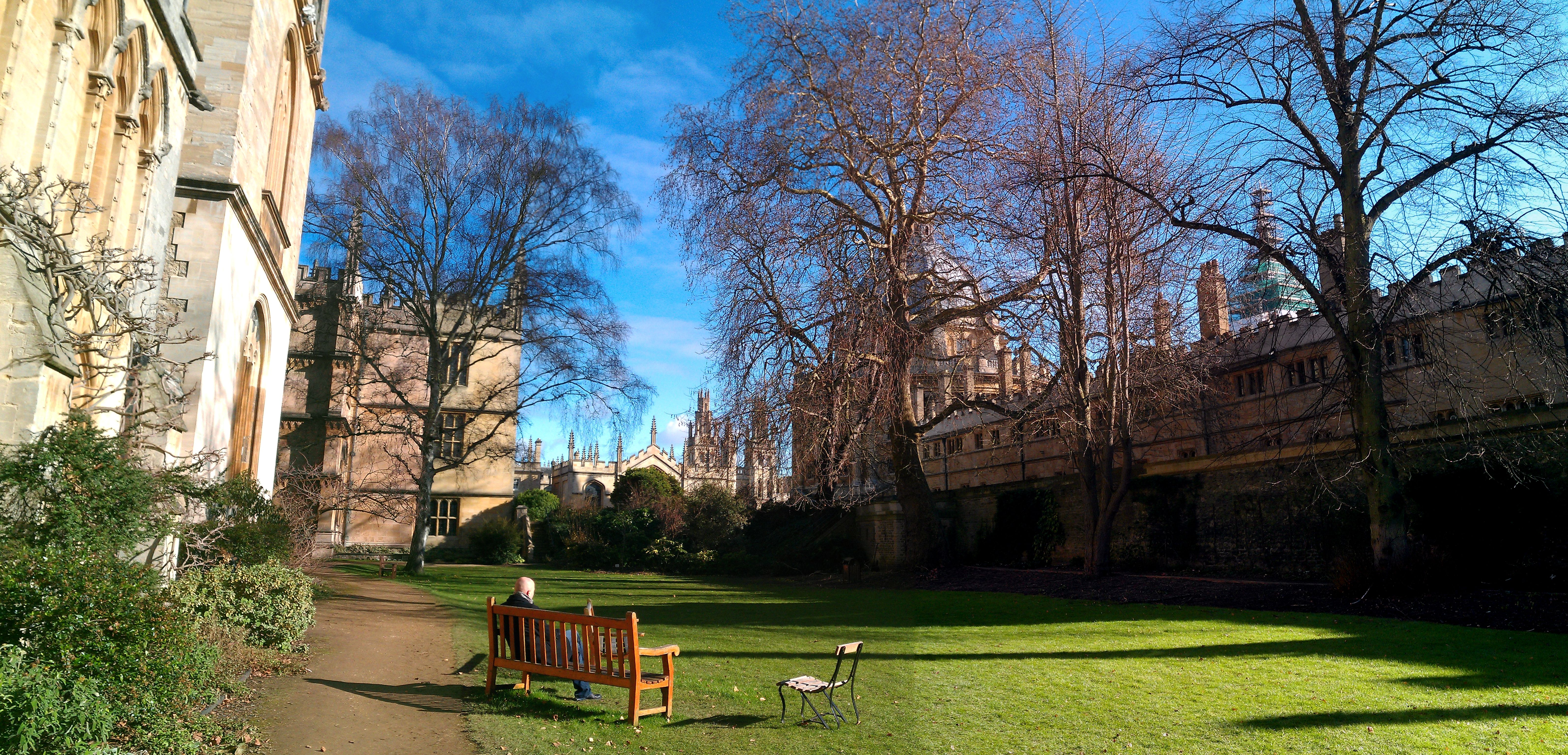
The Fellows' Garden, looking toward Radcliffe Square

A passageway from the Front Quadrangle leads through to the College's Fellows' Garden, in which stands the library, designed by Gilbert Scott in the 13th-century style. The area is also bounded on the left hand side by Convocation House, the Divinity School and the Bodleian Library, and on the right by Brasenose Lane. The Mound, situated at the end of the Garden, offers views over Radcliffe Square, including All Souls' College and the Radcliffe Camera.

=== Cohen Quad ===
In 2007–2008, the College purchased the main site of Ruskin College on Walton Street for £7 million. The buildings were redeveloped to designs by Alison Brooks Architects to provide a range of student bedrooms, teaching rooms, and study space. In 2017 Cohen Quad was formally opened, named for the parents of Sir Ronald Cohen. The premises represent the College's largest physical expansion since the 14th century. The Cohen Quad won an RIBA South Award as well as Regional Building of the Year.

=== In literature and films ===
Exeter College is the basis for the fictional Jordan College in Philip Pullman's novel trilogy His Dark Materials. The 2007 film version of the first novel, The Golden Compass (originally Northern Lights), used the College for location filming. The final episode of Inspector Morse in 2000 (season 8 episode 5), based upon the novel The Remorseful Day, was filmed in the college chapel and Front Quadrangle, where Morse has a fatal heart attack. In 2016 scenes were filmed in the college chapel for the Marvel movie Doctor Strange starring Benedict Cumberbatch. Scenes for the 2019 film Tolkien were shot at the College (where J. R. R. Tolkien studied), including in the Fellows' Garden. The Apple TV series Suspicion filmed scenes in the college dining hall in 2021.

== Student life ==
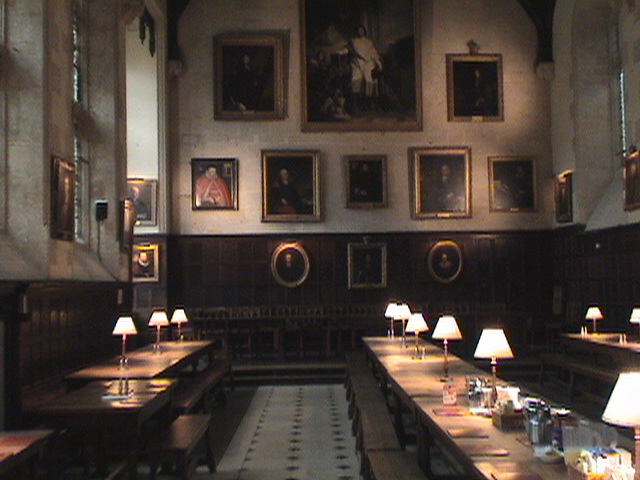
Dining hall

Exeter has a reputation for having a close-knit student body. First-year undergraduates are housed on the College's Turl Street site, and there is dedicated graduate accommodation for the College on Iffley Road.

As the university's fourth oldest college, a certain emphasis is placed on tradition, especially during special occasions such as the annual Burns Night, a dinner in honour of the Scottish poet Robert Burns, when a traditional meal of haggis is served. The College's ties with Williams College in the United States through the Williams-Exeter Programme at Oxford, as well as the generally international composition of the MCR, makes the annual Thanksgiving dinner a popular occasion.

=== Choir ===
Exeter has a mixed-voice choir, made up of 24 singers, which is administered, conducted and accompanied solely by the Organ Scholars. It is the only college in either Oxford or Cambridge where a choir, run entirely by the Organ Scholar, sings three services a week, and has been heard recently on a number of broadcasts for BBC Radio 4's The Daily Service. The College offers Choral and Parry–Wood Organ Scholarships, and former Organ Scholars include Robert Sharpe (Director of Music, York Minster), Christopher Herrick (International Concert Organist and former organist, Westminster Abbey), and David Trendell (director of music, King's College London), as well as directors of music at Rugby, Charterhouse, Sherborne, and Latymer Upper Schools.

=== Sports ===
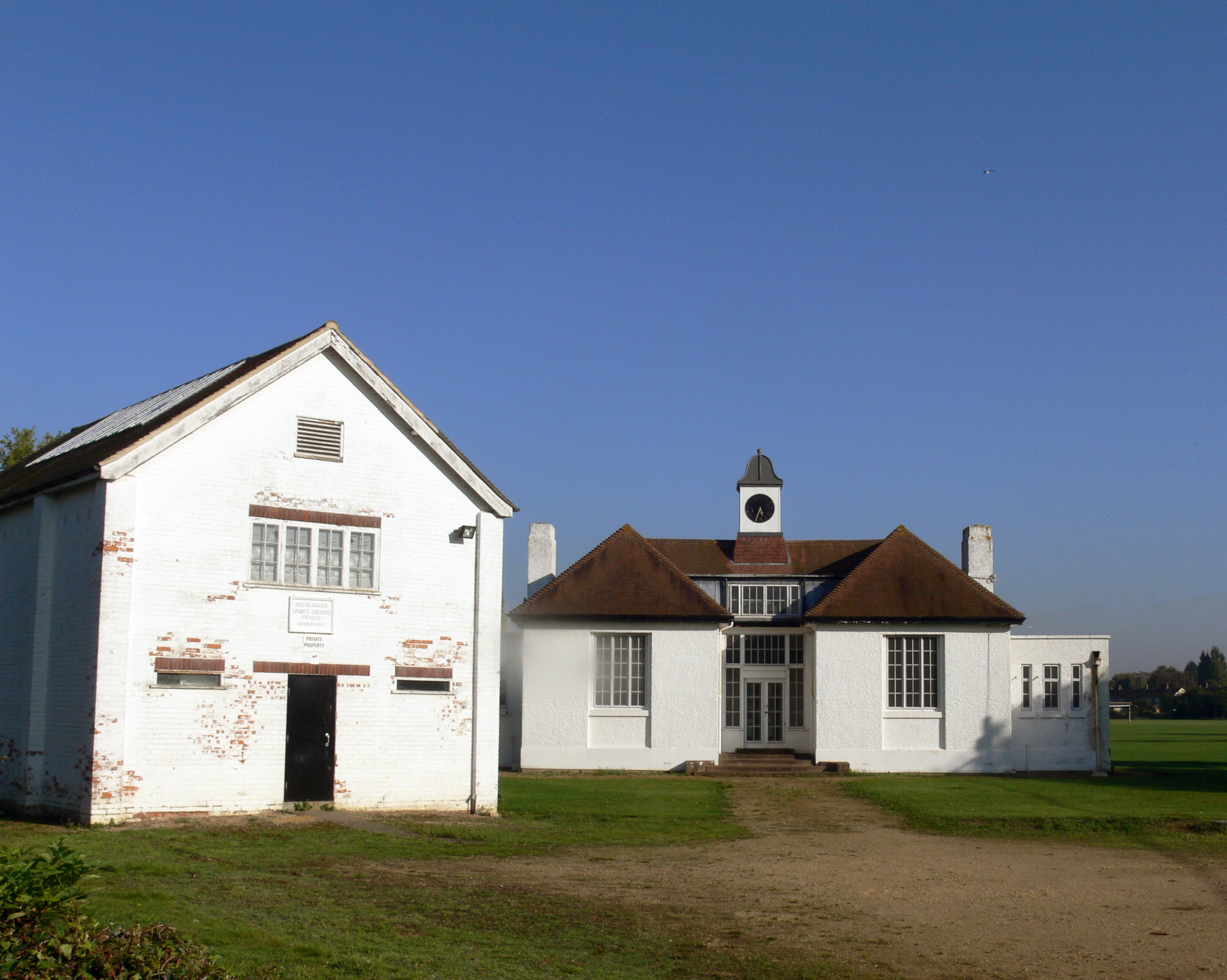
Exeter Recreation Ground buildings

Sports at Exeter College are not directly organised by the college itself, but rather by student-run clubs. Exeter College own their own sports grounds, which can be used by these student clubs within University Parks. The sports that have active student run clubs as of October 2023 are: boating, netball, football, cricket, badminton, hockey, rugby, ice hockey, pool, darts, croquet, and lacrosse.

In March 2014 Exeter College Association Football Club defeated St Catherine's College 2–1 in the final of the Cuppers tournament to lift the trophy for the first time in over 40 years. In May 2019 Turl Street Rugby, made up of students from Exeter College, Jesus College and Lincoln College, won Oxford's inaugural 15-a-side Women's Rugby Union Cuppers tournament. In May 2024, Exeter College Rugby Football Club secured the Cuppers Bowl Trophy with a narrow victory, defeating a combined team from St Catherine's, Mansfield, Corpus Christi, Somerville, and Merton Colleges by a score of 17–15.

== People associated with Exeter ==
=== Former students ===
Amongst Exeter's alumni are many writers, including J. R. R. Tolkien, Alan Bennett, Martin Amis and Philip Pullman; Roger Bannister, the first man to run a mile in under four minutes; the actors Richard Burton and Imogen Stubbs; Liaquat Ali Khan, the first prime minister of Pakistan, John Kufuor, the former president of Ghana and Pedro Pablo Kuczynski, former president of Peru.

=== Academics and tutors ===
- Basil Allchin, organist
- C. T. Atkinson, Fellow and tutor in military history, 1898–1955.
- Frank Close
- Cornelia Druțu
- Raymond Dwek
- Sandra Fredman
- William Gould
- Catherine M. Green
- Michael Hart
- Elizabeth Jeffreys
- Eric Waldram Kemp, Fellow, tutor, and chaplain 1946–1969, later bishop of Chichester
- Jacob Klein
- George Alfred Kolkhorst, Reader in Spanish 1931–1958
- John Maddicott, History fellow
- Michael Osborne (academic)
- George Rawlinson
- Andrew Steane
- Magdi Wahba, Egyptian academic and lexicographer
- Helen Watanabe-O'Kelly, Official fellow and tutor in German

=== Rectors ===
On 1 October 2024, Andrew Roe was sworn in as the next rector of the college.
