= John de Norwich (died 1362) =

English knight and administrator

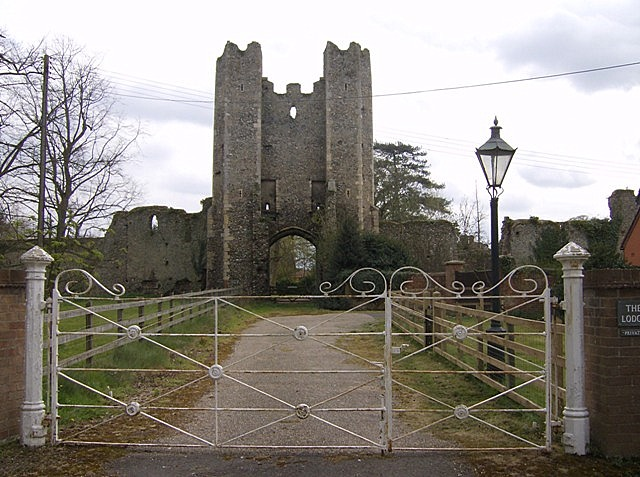
Mettingham Castle

Sir John de Norwich (died 1362), was a 14th-century English knight and administrator who served as Admiral of the Fleet from the Thames northwards (1336), lieutenant of the Seneschal of Gascony (1338), summoned to parliament in 1342, and fought during the Second War of Scottish Independence and Hundred Years' War in Gascony and France.

== Life ==
Norwich was the eldest son of Walter de Norwich and Catherine de Hedersete. After succeeding his father, he was granted a royal licence in 1334 for a weekly market and annual fair at Great Massingham. He took part in the English invasions of Scotland in 1332 and 1335 and in April 1336 was appointed Admiral of the Fleet from the Thames northwards. John served as lieutenant of the Seneschal of Gascony, Oliver de Ingham in 1338. Norwich was summoned to parliament in 1342, and in 1343 was given a licence to crenellate his manor houses at Mettingham, Suffolk and also Blackworth and Lyng in Norfolk.

In 1344 he was again serving in France, before returning to England and then participated in Henry, Earl of Lancaster's chevauchée of 1346. John was in England during Easter 1347, however returned to France later in the year. A grievance was lodge by Norwich during the January parliament of 1348. The holder of his manor of Benhall, near Saxmundham, had died without heirs, and on his wife's death the estate would in the ordinary course escheat to Norwich, as lord of the fee. King Edward III of England, however had granted it to Robert d'Ufford, Earl of Suffolk, Norwich's sister's Margaret husband. He does not appear to have been successful in his petition. John was again summoned to parliament in 1360. Norwich died in 1362 and was succeeded by his grandson John. He was buried at Raveningham, Norfolk, England.

== Marriage and issue ==
John married firstly Margaret de Mortimer of Atilburgh, and is known to have had the following issue:

- Walter, married Margaret Stapleton, died during his father's lifetime, had issue.

He married secondly Alicia, daughter of Roger de Huntingfield and Joan de Hobregge, without issue.
