= Noël Denholm-Young =

British historian

Noël Denholm-Young (5 January 1904 – 30 June 1975) was an English historian. He was a Fellow and archivist of Magdalen College, Oxford specialising in the political history of late medieval England. He worked as keeper of Western manuscripts at the Bodleian Library in Oxford, and later in the faculty of the University College of North Wales, Bangor. Among his publications was an edition of the chronicle Vita Edwardi Secundi.

He was born in Liverpool to John and Mira Denholm-Young. He matriculated at Keble College, Oxford, in 1923. He gained a second class degree in history BA (1926). This became an MA and BLitt in 1930. He transferred to Christ Church, Oxford, where he was senior scholar (1928–30). The following year he was fellow by examination at Magdalen, and special election (1933–1946). Suffering from ill-health, he moved to UC of North Wales at Bangor to be senior lecturer. Magdalen has his archive papers of letters and correspondence.

== Select publications ==
- editor E M Snodgrass Calendar of the Archives of Queen's College, Oxford. 1931.
- Seignorial Administration in England. London: Oxford University Press. 1963 [1937].
- Collected Papers on Mediaeval Subjects. Oxford: Blackwell. 1969 [1946]. ISBN 0-900768-21-5.
- Richard of Cornwall. Oxford: Blackwell. 1947. ISBN 0-900768-21-5.
- The Liber Epistolaris of Richard de Bury. 1950.
- Mont of Malmesbury (1957). The Vita Edwardi Secundi.
- The Mappa Mundi of Richard of Haldingham at Hereford. 1957.
- Seignorial Administration in England. 1963.
- History and Heraldry, 1254-1310: A Study of the Historical Value of the Rolls of Arms. 1965.
- The Country Gentry in the Fourteenth Century: With Special Reference to the Heraldic Rolls of Arms. Oxford: Clarendon. 1969. ISBN 0-19-822301-3.
