= Richard Stapledon =

English judge and politician

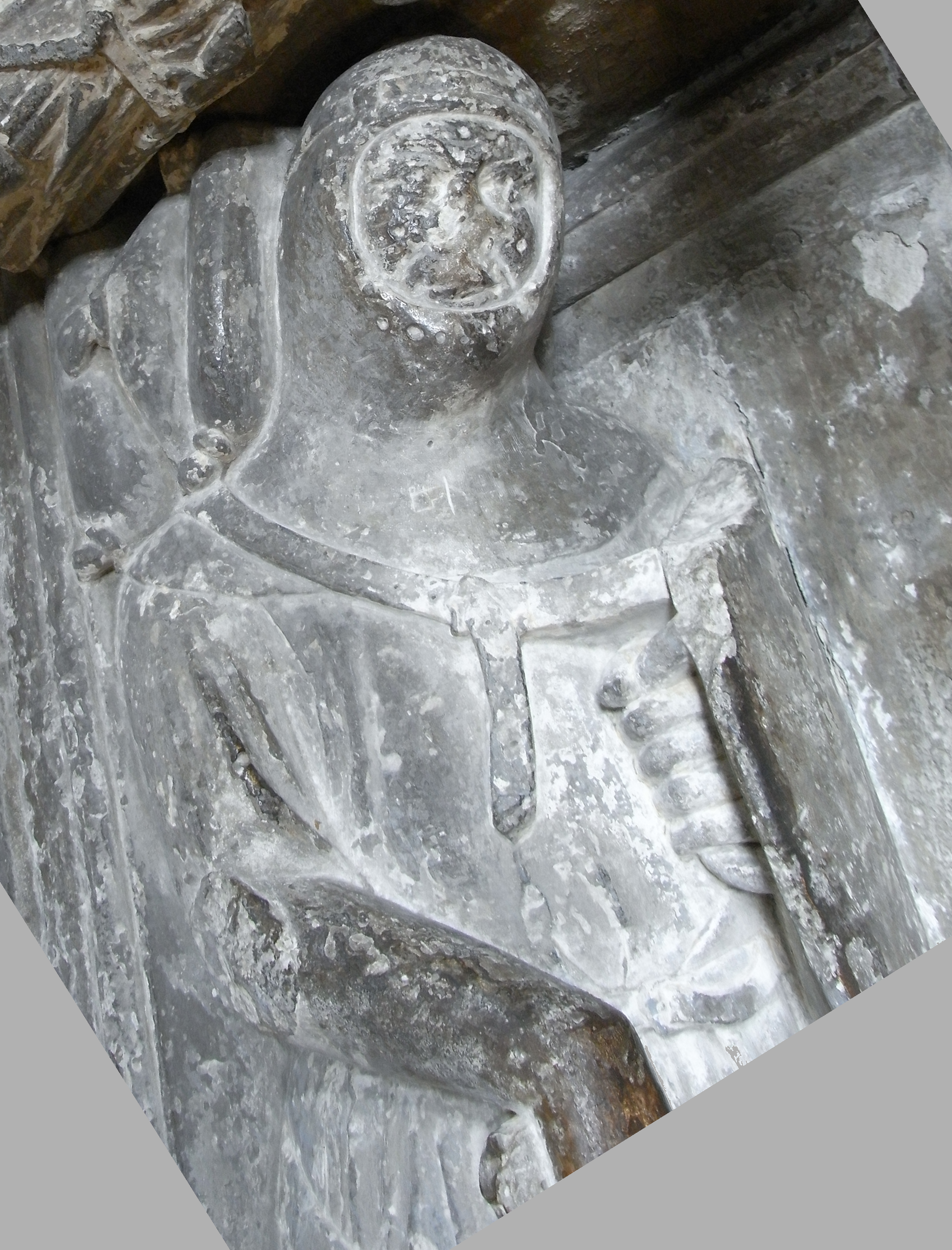
Sir Richard de Stapledon, detail from his effigy in Exeter Cathedral

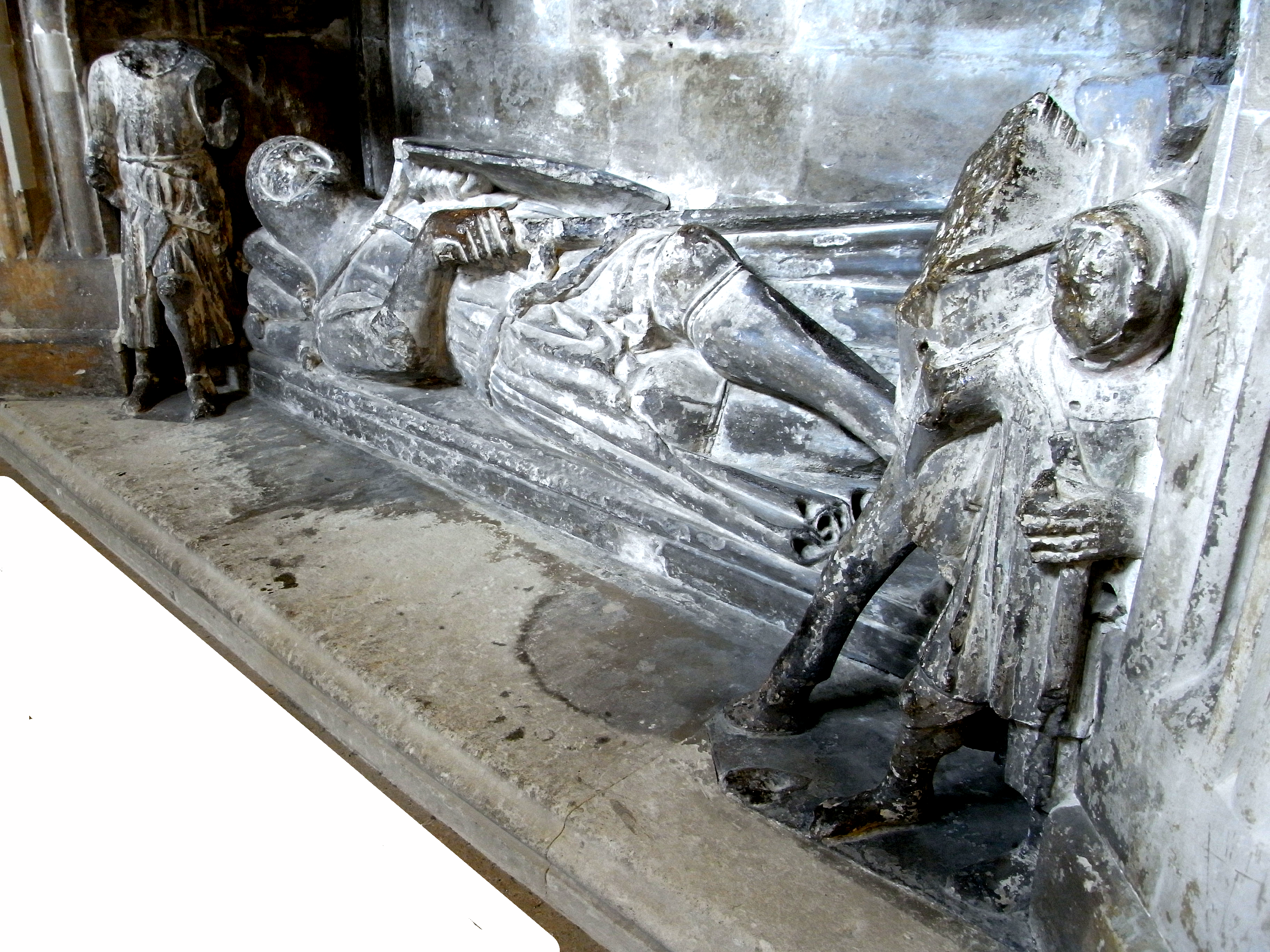
Monument and effigy of Sir Richard de Stapledon, dressed as an armed knight, Exeter Cathedral. The cross-legged posture is supposed to denote a crusader

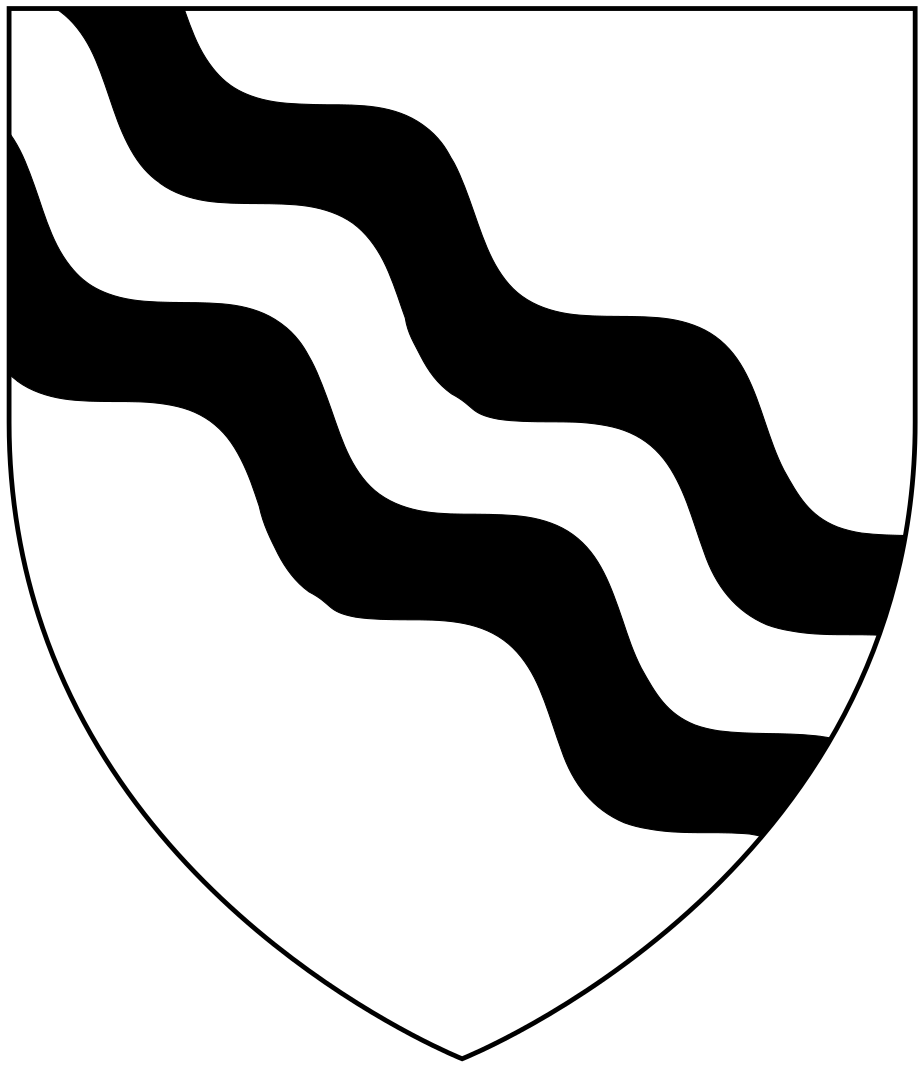
Arms of Stapledon: Argent, two bends undée sable

Sir Richard Stapledon (died 1326) was an English judge and politician, the elder brother of Walter Stapledon (died 1326), Bishop of Exeter. His effigy and monument survive in Exeter Cathedral.

== Origins ==
The Stapledons were minor gentry who had lands at Stapledon in the parish of Cookbury in Devon, his parents being William and Mabel Stapledon and his younger brother Walter Stapledon.

== Career ==
Stapledon was a lawyer and a judge, a Justice of Assizes for the western circuit. Few records have survived concerning his career. In August 1315 he entertained his brother the bishop at his manor house at Stapledon when he came to dedicate Cookbury church. He also was granted by his brother a licence to have a private chapel at Stapledon, a common request made by many of the medieval country gentry. The estate of Stapledon descended as Annery.

== Landholdings ==
Records of a lawsuit brought against "Richard de Stapledon, knight, of Devon" in 1341/5, thus after his death, or perhaps referring to a son then living, for recovery of a debt of £28 5 shillings owed to Master Robert Hereward, Archdeacon of Taunton, reveal that Stapledon held lands in Devon including one knight's fee in Huish, Fremington Hundred; parts of a fee in Stapledon, Cookbury, etc. in Black Torrington Hundred; in West Down, Braunton Hundred and in Broad Harford in South Molton Hundred.

=== Milton Damerel (demesne) ===
Stapledon was granted the demesnes of the manor of Milton Damerel by Hugh Courtenay, 2nd Earl of Devon (1303–1377), whose effigy also survives in Exeter Cathedral. Milton Damerel later passed with Annery to the Hankfords.

=== Drannack, land and advowson ===
In 1311 Stapledon received a grant of one acre in the parish of Drannack, near Gwinear in Cornwall, with the advowson of the Church of St Winneri, authorised by the overlord Gilbert de Clare, 8th Earl of Gloucester. In 1318 he conveyed the same to the Diocese of Exeter and the possessions, including the Gwinear great tithes, were then bestowed by his brother the bishop as part of the endowment of his foundation of Stapleton Hall, Oxford, later Exeter College. The income from the tithes provided twelve scholarships, for "poor but sober boys", eight in Devon and four in Cornwall.

== Marriage and progeny ==
No records survive concerning the identity of Stapledon's wife. It was stated by Prince that Stapledon's progeny continued in the male line at Annery for a further two or three generations, and then on the failure of the male line passed via a daughter and sole heiress, Thomasine Stapledon, to her husband Sir Richard I Hankford, son of Sir William Hankford (d. 1422), KB, Lord Chief Justice of England.

== Death and burial ==
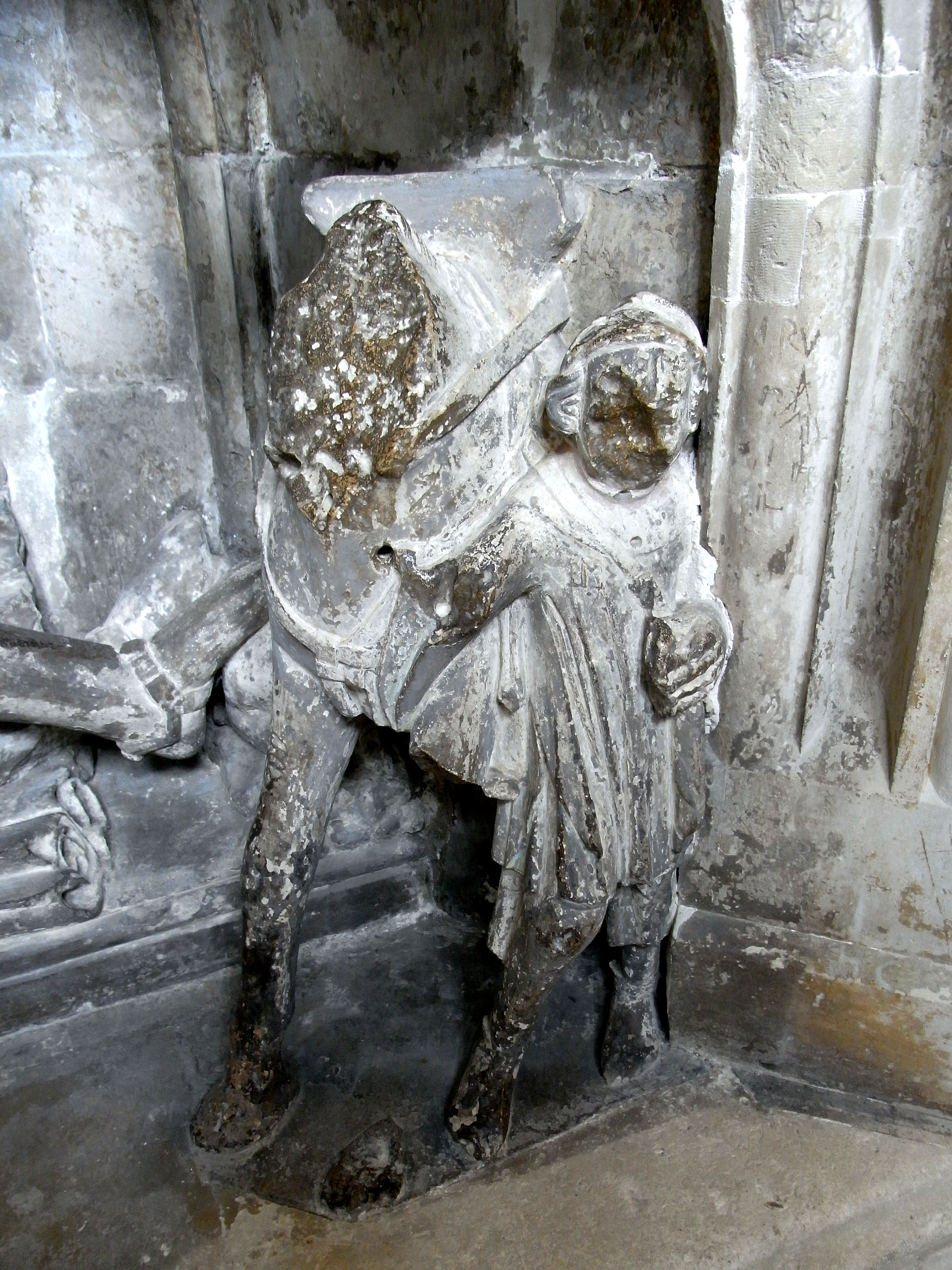
Horse and squire (or a cripple), detail from monument to Richard Stapledon, Exeter Cathedral

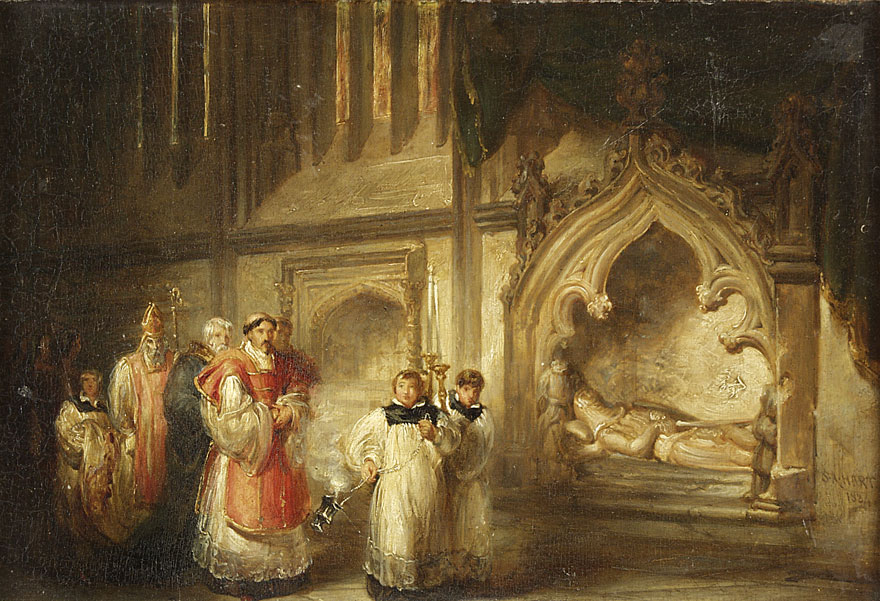
Painting by Solomon Hart, 1884, titled The Monument of Richard Stapleton in Exeter Cathedral

On 14 October 1326, Stapledon was murdered in the City of London, whilst trying to rescue his brother the bishop from an angry mob, which shortly afterwards murdered the latter also. The events were as follows. Bishop Stapledon was associated in the popular mind with the misdeeds of King Edward II. On fleeing London before the advancing troops of Queen Isabella, that king appointed Stapledon Custos or "Keeper" of the City of London, the population of which was mostly in favour of the Queen. Foreseeing her forced entry into the City, Stapledon demanded from the Lord Mayor of London the keys to the gates, in order to lock her out. However, when the population heard of this they "lay in wait to surprise the bishop", who fled for safety from this mob into St Paul's Cathedral. According to Prince (d. 1723), Sir Richard was with his brother at the time and attempted to save him from the mob. However, as they rode (presumably from Blackfriars where (according to William de Dene's history of the See of Rochester) the Bishop of London and Bishop Stapledon had gathered together with a group of the Kings Justices) into the City towards St Paul's, through the gate called Cripplegate, a cripple took hold of one of the forelegs of Sir Richard's horse and by crossing it threw the horse and rider to the ground, whereupon Sir Richard was murdered by the mob. The bishop reached St Paul's, but found no safety there as the mob entered and dragged him out and proceeded to beat and wound him and dragged him to the Great Cross at Cheapside "where those sons of the devil most barborously murdered him" on 15 October 1326. The bishop was eventually given an honourable burial on the north side of the chancel of Exeter Cathedral, where his effigy and monument survive. The murder of Sir Richard Stapledon is described as part of a verse epitaph in Latin composed by John Hooker (d.1601) and formerly visible above the monument of his brother the bishop:

"Auxilio cupiit dum fratri frater adesse,
Acriter in fratrem gens malesuada premit,
Arrepto similem plebs infert effera mortem,
Strage hac exultat sanguinolenta truci,
Certe miles erat fortisque bonusque favori,
Rarus ac in rabie suevit adesse locus".

("He desired the help of his brother, his brother being present; swiftly the evil-intentioned people pressed forward to his brother; who having been snatched likewise the people caused his death; and exulted by this bloody, savage slaughter; Certainly he was a knight, strong and good; of rare favour and accustomed to be present in a place of fury").

== Monument in Exeter Cathedral ==
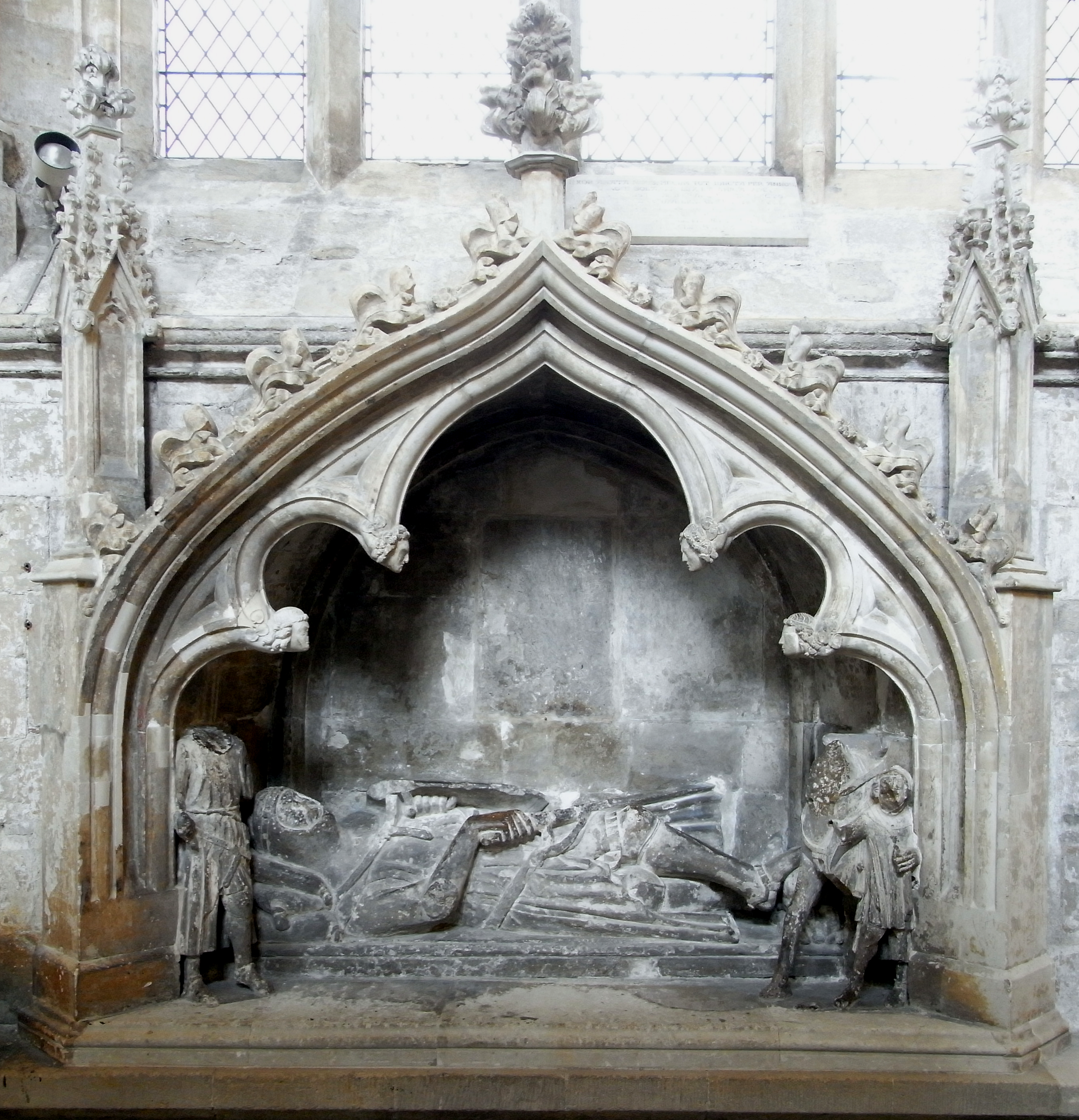
Monument to Sir Richard Stapledon, Exeter Cathedral

Sir Richard was also buried in Exeter Cathedral, near his brother the bishop, against the north wall across the north ambulatory from the bishop's tomb. His tomb is marked by an elaborate monument comprising a recessed ogee shaped niche set into the wall, containing his recumbent effigy, in the form of a cross-legged knight, which style supposedly represents crusaders. At the effigy's head stands a small statue of a man and at the feet a horse with an even smaller statue of a man holding its reins. According to Prince (d. 1723) this last group refers to the tradition of the cripple who seised the foreleg of Sir Richard's horse at Cripplegate and thereby threw him off his horse into the hands of the murderous mob. It is however more likely that the figures are "a touching early fourteenth century visual representation of the Knight with his immediate following ... a knight is shown accompanied by his squire, page and horse". The Devon historian Sir William Pole (d. 1635) stated that the arms of Stapledon (Argent, two bends wavy sable) were displayed on the shield of the effigy, but today no trace of colour remains. These arms are however still visible (possibly restored) on the nearby monument to his brother the bishop.
