= Walter de Norwich =

English statesman (died 1319)

Sir Walter de Norwich Baron of the Exchequer

Chief Baron of the Exchequer
- In office 2 February 1327 – 1329
- Monarch: Edward III
- Preceded by: Hervey de Stanton
- Succeeded by: John Stonor
- In office 1317 – after 1320
- Monarch: Edward II
- In office 8 March 1312 – 28 September 1314
- Monarch: Edward II

Lord High Treasurer
- Acting; 25 August 1321 – 10 May 1322
- Monarch: Edward II
- Preceded by: Walter Stapledon
- Succeeded by: Walter Stapledon
- Acting; 29 September 1319 – 18 February 1320
- Monarch: Edward II
- Preceded by: Walter Stapledon
- Succeeded by: John Sandale
- In office 26 September 1314 – 27 May 1317
- Monarch: Edward II
- Preceded by: John Sandale
- Succeeded by: John Hotham
- Acting; 17 May 1312 – 4 October 1312
- Monarch: Edward II
- Preceded by: Walter Langton
- Succeeded by: John Sandale
- Acting; 23 October 1311 – 23 January 1312
- Monarch: Edward II
- Preceded by: John Sandale
- Succeeded by: Walter Langton

Personal details
- Died: 1329
- Spouse: Catherine de Hedersett
- Children: 4, including John
- Relatives: Robert Ufford, 1st Earl of Suffolk (son in law)

Sir Walter de Norwich (died 1329) was an English statesman who served as Lord High Treasurer, Chief Baron of the Exchequer and as a Baron of the Exchequer between 1311 and 1329.

== Early life ==
Walter de Norwich was possibly the son of Geoffrey de Norwich. Though, other sources have suggested he was the son of Sir John de Norwich, Lord of Mettingham.

The first reference to Norwich was in 1297; which stated that he held the manor Stoke, Norfolk.

== Career ==
Norwich was in the royal service on 15 March 1308 as a remembrancer, and on 24 November 1308 he became a clerk of the Exchequer. He became a Baron of the Exchequer on 29 August 1311 but resigned on 23 October to act as Lord High Treasurer. He became a Baron of the Exchequer again on 3 March 1312 and became Chief Baron of the Exchequer on 8 March 1312. He became lord High Treasurer again on 17 May 1312 whilst retaining his position as Chief Baron, before leaving the position on 4 October 1312.

On 26 September 1314, he was appointed Lord High Treasurer and resigned as Chief Baron two days later. He resigned as Lord High Treasurer on 27 May 1317, but became Chief Baron again until at least 1320. In April 1318, in his capacity as a Baron of the Exchequer, Norwich was present at the parliament held in Leicester to attempt a reconciliation between the King and Thomas of Lancaster. He again served as Lord High Treasurer from 29 September 1319 to 18 February 1320.

In 1321, Norwich was a judge in the trial of Roger Mortimer of Chirk and of Roger Mortimer of Wigmore. He became Chief Baron again on 2 February 1327 under new king Edward III, despite his condemnation of the Mortimers whose sentences were both eventually cancelled.

== Personal life and death ==
Norwich was married to Catherine, daughter of John de Hedersett and widow of Peter Bracuhe. They had three sons: John, Roger and Thomas. Their son, John, became a Member of Parliament (MP). Their daughter, Margaret, married firstly to Sir Thomas Cailey and then to Robert Ufford, 1st Earl of Suffolk.

Walter de Norwich died in 1329 and was buried in Norwich Cathedral. He was survived by his wife.
