= Walter Stapledon =

English bishop and Treasurer of England (died 1326)

Walter Stapeldon
- Bishop of Exeter
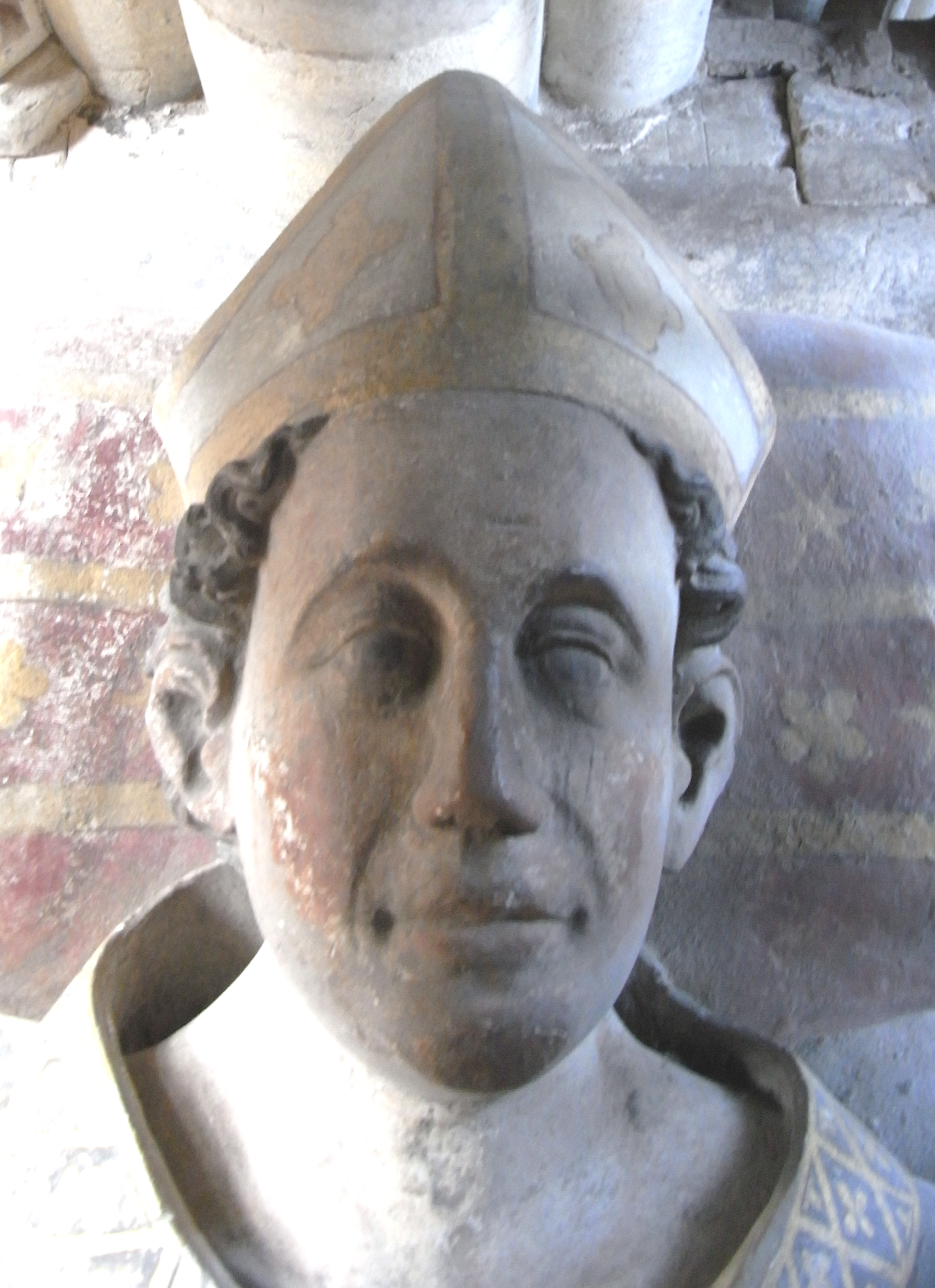
- Walter Stapeldon (died 1326), Bishop of Exeter. Detail from his effigy in Exeter Cathedral
- Appointed: 13 March 1307
- Term ended: 15 October 1326
- Predecessor: Thomas Bitton
- Successor: James Berkeley
- Previous post: Papal chaplain

Personal details
- Born: before 1266 Devon, England
- Died: 14 October 1326 London
- Denomination: Catholic

Walter Stapeldon (died 15 October 1326) was an English cleric and administrator who was Bishop of Exeter from 1308 and twice served as Lord High Treasurer of England, in 1320 and from 1322 to 1325. He founded what became Exeter College, Oxford and contributed liberally to the rebuilding of Exeter Cathedral, where his tomb and monument survive. He was killed by a mob during the London uprising.

== Origins ==
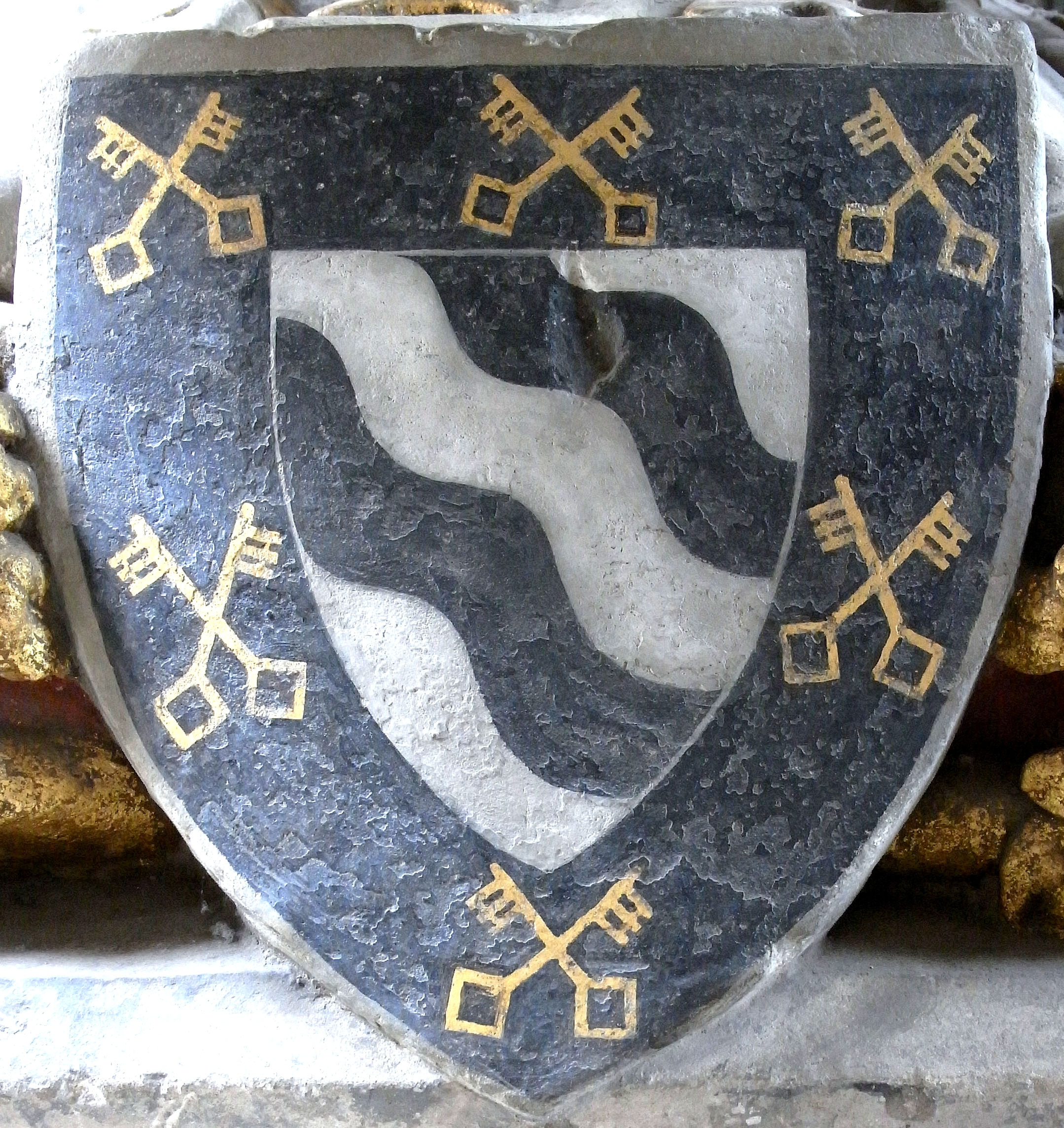
Arms of Walter Stapledon (died 1326), Bishop of Exeter, from his restored monument in Exeter Cathedral: Argent, two bends undée sable (Stapledon) within a bordure of the last charged with six pairs of keys addorsed and interlaced the wards upwards or (bordure of Bishop Stapledon, being the arms of the See of Exeter)

Born on a 1 February in or before 1265, his parents were William and Mabel Stapledon, from a gentry family who lived in the Devon parish of Cookbury. His elder brother was Richard Stapledon (died 1326), a judge and politician.

== Career ==
Educated at Oxford, where he was awarded a master's degree in 1286 and a doctorate in 1306, he entered the service of Bishop Bitton in Exeter in 1300 and succeeded him in 1308. As well as duties in the diocese, he had already been on royal duty in Aquitaine and from then on combined his episcopal activities, which he never neglected, with service as a royal adviser and envoy. He was sent often to France and also to the Low Countries, as well as taking part in negotiations with Scotland. From 1313 he sat in Parliament and from 1315 was a member of the Privy Council.

With the country subject to increasing tensions under the stormy rule of King Edward II, he accepted the difficult post of Treasurer in 1320. After the king was forced to exile the Despensers, a move he considered unwise, he resigned in 1321 and gave his reasons in a letter which annoyed the king. Reappointed in 1322, he faced increasing problems in raising revenue from a country suffering from civil wars and the cost of external wars in Scotland and Aquitaine. Though a truce was negotiated with the Scots, he was party to seizures of lands in England, including estates of Queen Isabella. She was already antagonistic to Stapledon, accusing him of abandoning her when she fled with her son to France and now regarded him as an enemy. Removed from office in 1325, after Isabella invaded England he went to London, where the people of the city were intensely hostile to him and his brother. After his house was looted and burned, both were murdered in the street on 15 October 1326 and his head was sent to the queen.

As well as his services to the Catholic church in the west of England and to the Crown, he also encouraged architecture, archiving and learning. With his brother Richard, in 1314 he founded Stapledon Hall at Oxford, which has since become Exeter College.

== Monument ==
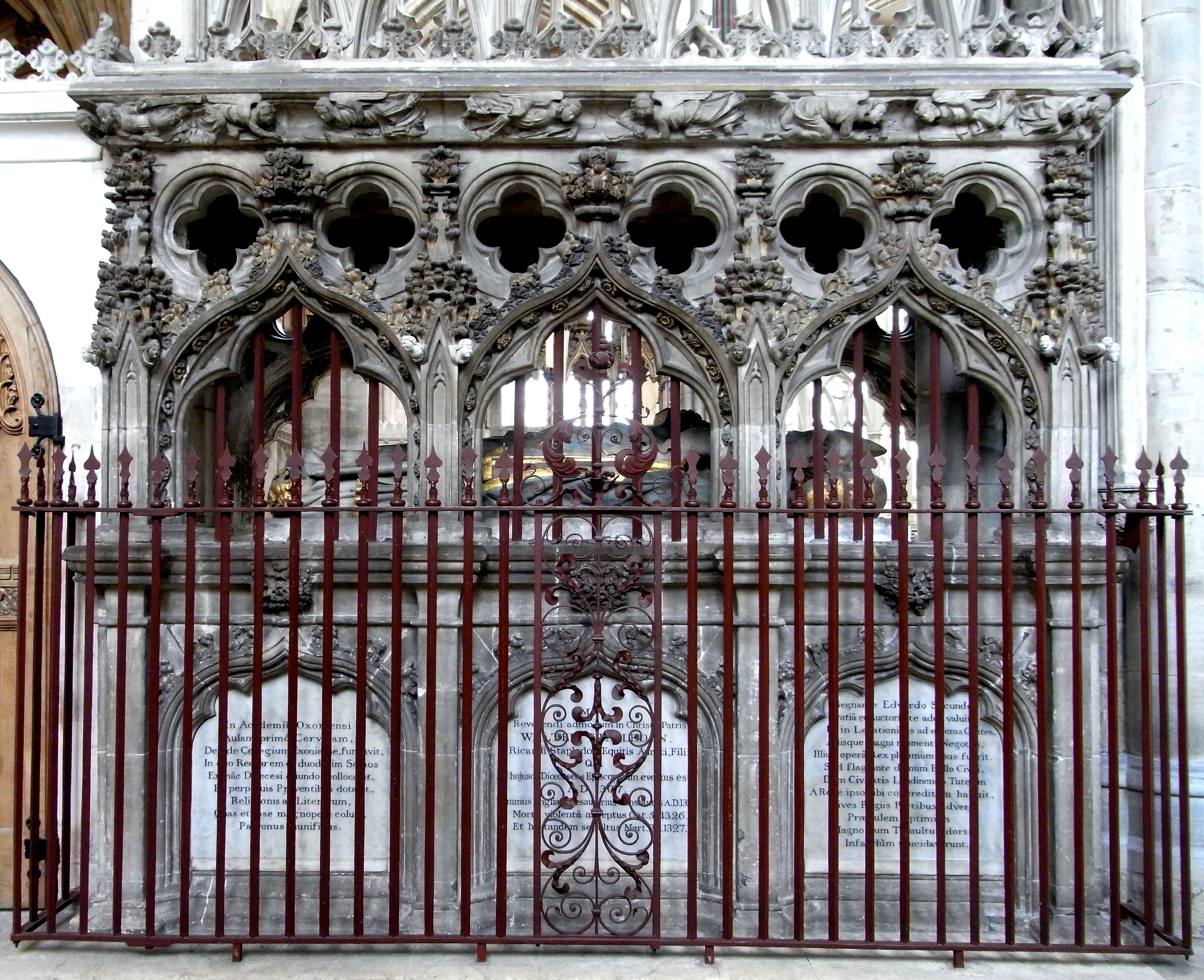
North (rear) side of monument to Bishop Walter Stapledon in Exeter Cathedral, viewed from the north ambulatory. Directly behind the viewer is the monument to his brother Sir Richard Stapledon

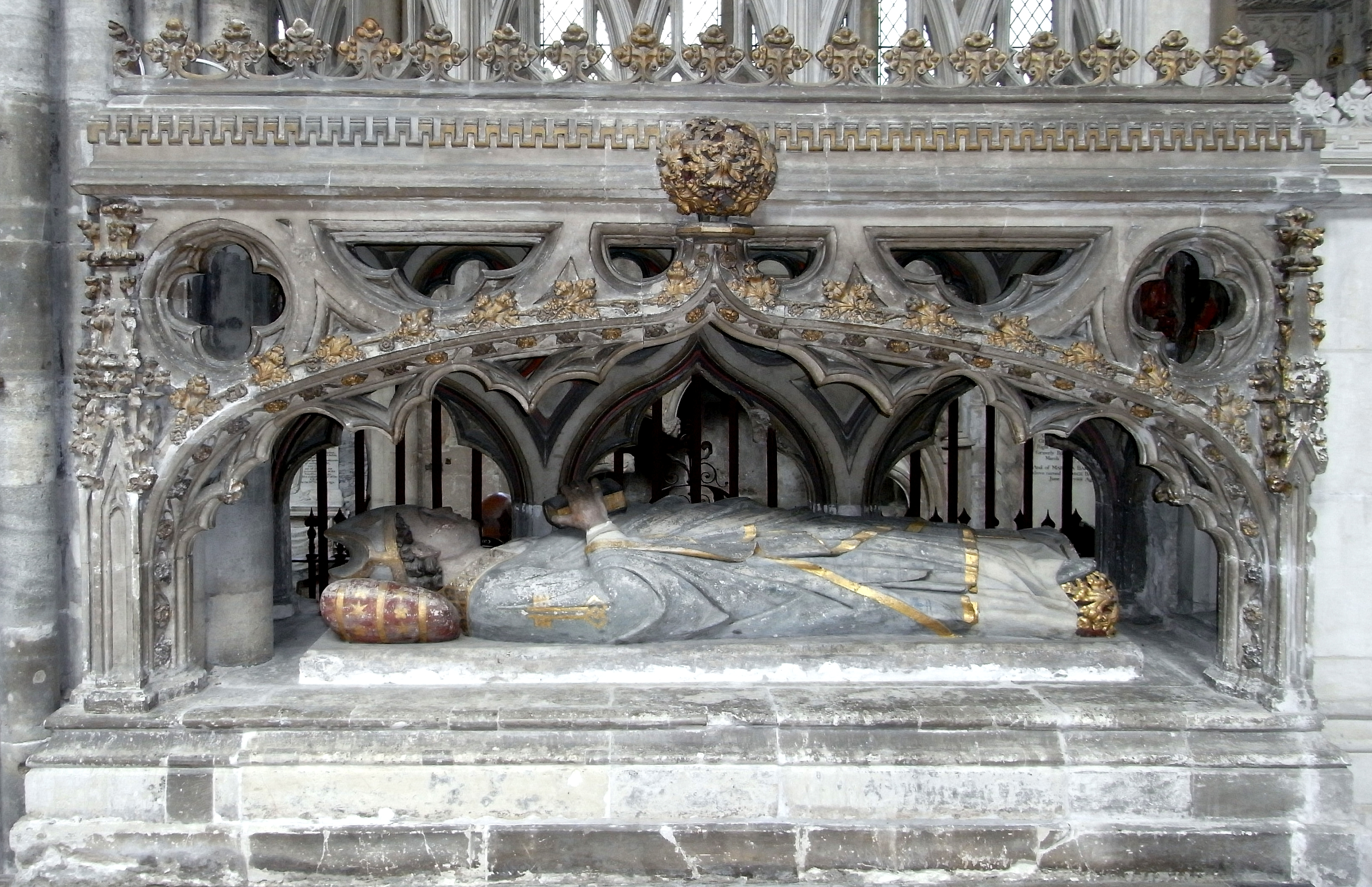
Monument to Bishop Walter Stapledon, Exeter Cathedral, viewed from within the choir

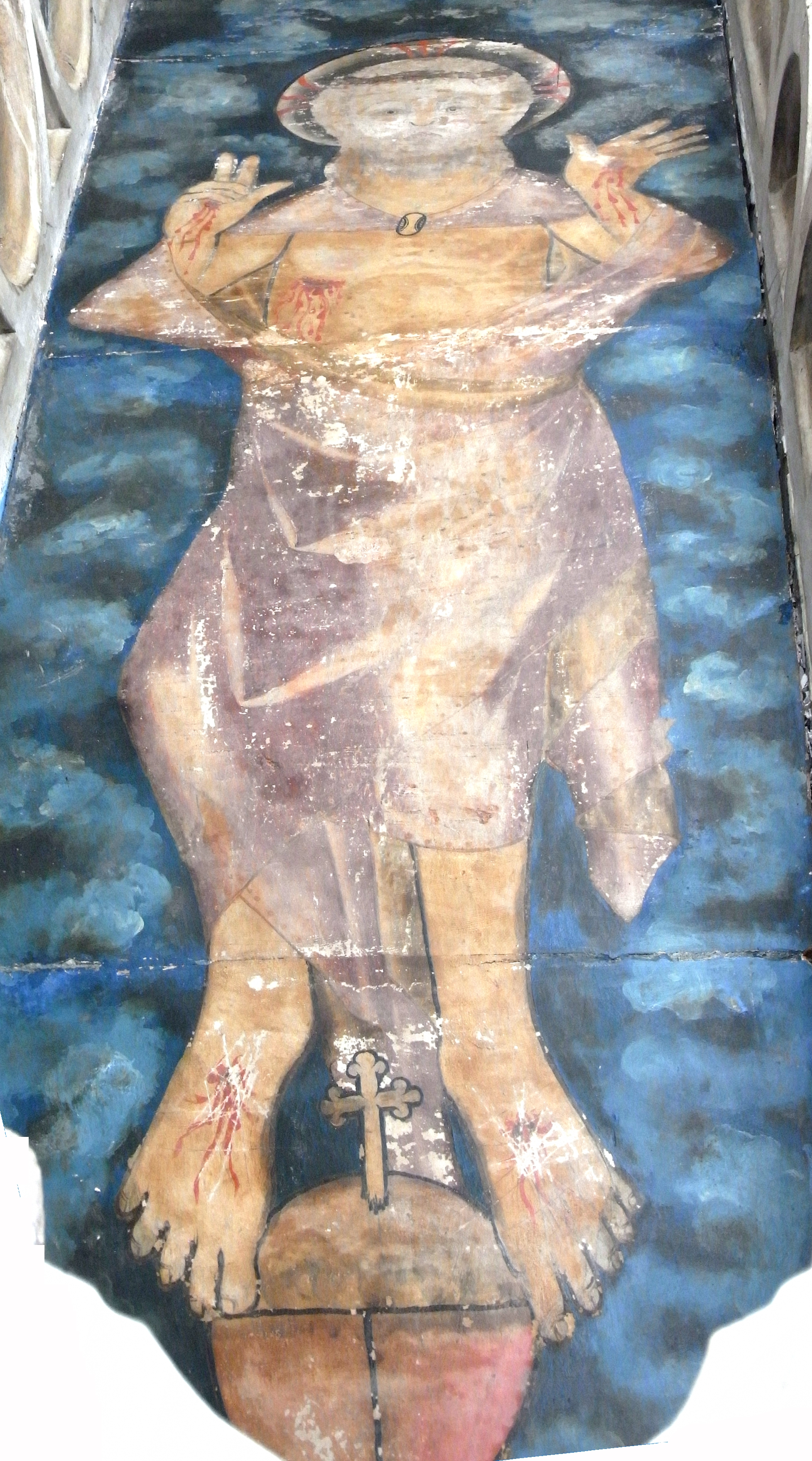
Wall painting c. 1326 on ceiling of canopy of monument to Bishop Walter Stapledon, Exeter Cathedral

His monument in the choir on the north side of the high altar is the cathedral's most important 14th-century monument. It consists of a recumbent robed effigy of the bishop, holding in his left hand a crozier and in his right hand a book, within a gothic canopy all made of Beer stone. On the ceiling of the canopy, invisible to the casual observer but looking down onto the bishop's effigy, is a contemporary painting of Christ displaying his Five Holy Wounds. An epitaph by John Hooker was added in 1568 but later removed.

Political offices
Preceded by Walter Norwich	Lord High Treasurer; 1320–1321	Succeeded by Walter Norwich
Preceded by Walter Norwich	Lord High Treasurer; 1322–1325	Succeeded by William Melton
Catholic Church titles
Preceded by Thomas Bitton	Bishop of Exeter; 1308–1326	Succeeded by James Berkeley
