= Wendy R. Childs =

British academic

Wendy R. Childs (born March 1943) is Emeritus Professor of Later Medieval History at the University of Leeds.

== Early life and education ==
Childs was educated at Girton College, Cambridge where she completed the degrees of BA (later promoted to MA) and PhD.

== Academic career ==
Childs was appointed as a Lecturer in the School of History at the University of Leeds in 1975. She was promoted to Reader in 1997 and to Professor of Later Medieval History in 2005. She was Director of the university's Institute for Medieval Studies from 1983 to 1993 and Chair of the School of History from 1991 to 1994. She retired in 2007 when she became emeritus professor

Childs is a specialist in the economic history of medieval Europe and the international trade of England in the thirteenth and fourteenth centuries. She has also written about fourteenth century politics (especially during the reign of King Edward II) and the English chronicles.

== Selected publications ==
- Anglo-Castilian trade in the later Middle Ages . Manchester University Press, Manchester, 1978.
- The Customs accounts of Hull, 1453-1490. Yorkshire Archaeological Society, 1986. (Edited)
- Politics and crisis in fourteenth-century England. Sutton, Gloucester, 1990. (Editor with John Taylor)
- The trade and shipping of Hull 1300-1500. East Yorkshire Local History Society, 1990.
- "Vita Edwardi Secundi: The Life of Edward the Second", ed. and tr. Wendy R. Childs & J.R. Maddicott, English Historical Review, Vol. CXX, No. 489 (2005).
- Trade and shipping in the medieval West: Portugal, Castile and England: A series of lectures in memoriam for Professor Armindo de Soussa, given in the University of Porto, November 2009 by Wendy R. Childs. Brepols, Turnhout, 2014.
- "From Chronicles to Customs Accounts: The Uses of Latin in the Long 14th Century", Proceedings of the British Academy, Vol. 206 (2017), pp. 85–105.
