= Dean and Chapter of St Paul's =

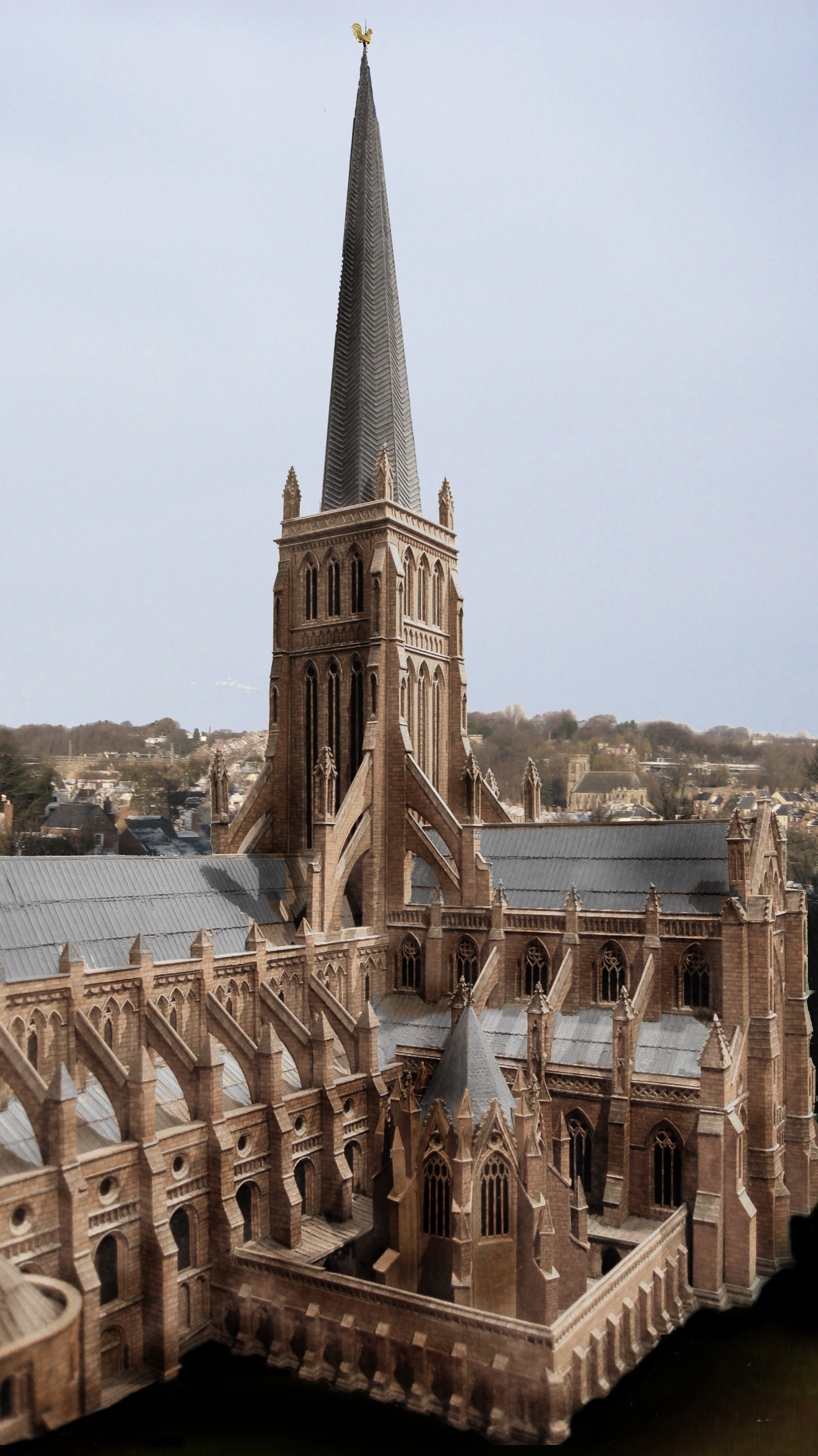
Model of the Old St. Paul's Cathedral in the Museum of London showing the chapter house

The Dean and Chapter of St Paul's Cathedral was the titular corporate body of St Paul's Cathedral in London up to the end of the twentieth century. It consisted of the dean and the canons, priests attached to the cathedral who were known as "prebendaries" because of the source of their income. The Dean and Chapter (or "Greater Chapter") was made up of a large number of priests who would meet "in chapter", but such meetings were infrequent and the actual governance was done by the Administrative Chapter headed by the dean, made up of several senior "residentiary canons", who were also known as the "Dean and Canons of St Paul’s" or simply "The Chapter".

The Cathedrals Measure 1999, a reform applying to nearly all cathedrals, termed the main governing body of the cathedrals "the Chapter"; reformed the Greater Chapter to include archdeacons and suffragan and assistant bishops (but not the diocesan bishop) as well as lay canons, giving it the title "The College of Canons" with the dean as its president; and also introduced a "Cathedral Council" responsible for changing the Constitution and Statutes and for approving the budget and accounts. The Measure also required lay people to be appointed to the Chapter. The titular corporate body has been known since 2000 as "The Corporation of the Cathedral Church of St Paul in London", and its membership consists of the members for the time being of the Chapter, the College of Canons, and the Council: the term "Dean and Chapter" is no longer valid in law. The Chapter is headed by the Dean of St Paul's, currently the Very Revd David Ison who was installed on 25 May 2012, and includes four ordained residentiary canons and up to four lay people.

Up to the early twentieth century canons were attached to prebendal stalls, and by the early thirteenth century, there were 30 of these. Many of the prebendal manors were some distance from the cathedral. For many years, the rents of these manors provided sufficiently valuable income to render the great majority of the prebendaries indifferent to reside at the cathedral and benefit from the increase in income that this would provide. Many of the prebends were awarded to senior clergy, including archdeacons and bishops, to top-up insufficient income from their archbishoprics, bishoprics and archdeaconries.

Fourteen of the prebendaries later became archbishops.

The prebendaries survived the reforms during the middle of the sixteenth century, perhaps because the cathedral had not been a monastic institution. The prebendal estates were taken over by the Ecclesiastical Commissioners in the later nineteenth century in exchange for a cash payment, the value of which was almost entirely lost to inflation during the twentieth century. The role of prebendary has become unpaid and largely honorary.

== Deans of St Pauls ==
See Deans of St Paul's.

== Prebendaries of Broomesbury ==
- Ailward Ruffus
- Arcoid
- Roger Brun
- Laurence Belesmeins
- Roger of Worcester
- Walter de Brackele
- Robert de Bonewell
- Ralph de August
- Roger de Meulent
- William Blundel
- William Middleton Possibly Archdeacon of Canterbury, 1276-78; and Bishop of Norwich, 1278
- Geoffrey Aspall
- Philip de Willoughby
- Philip de Wyleby c. 1291
- Reginald de Sancto Albano
- G. de Stowe ?-1327
- Richard de Brencheslee 1327
- Imbert de Puteo 1328-?
- Walter de London ?-1351
- Edmund de la Zouche 1351-1352
- William de Shrewsbury 1352-?
- John de Carleton ?-1385
- William de Borstall 1385-?
- William Newbold ?-1418
- John Sudbury 1418-1444
- Robert (or Richard) Wyott 1444-1449
- Thomas Bonifant ?-1468
- William Westbury, 1468-1477
- William Wylde 1477-?
- Edward Vaughan ?-1509. Bishop of St Davids
- John Edmunds 1509-1517. Afterwards Chancellor of St Paul’s Cathedral
- Hugh Saunders or Breakspear D.Th.1517-1537
- Robert Crowham or Peterson Late prior of Lewes. 1537-1555.
- Thomas Moreton 1555-1558
- Thomas Collyer 1558
- Thomas Byam ?-1562
- Matthew Hutton 1562-1589. Bishop of Durham 1589.
- Richard Bancroft 1590-1597. Bishop of London 1597.
- Thomas Singleton 1597-1614
- Isaac Singleton 1614-?
- William Braborn 1660-?
- John Scott 1685-1695
- George Walls 1695-1727
- Stephen Unwin 1728-1772
- Richard Hind 1772-1790.
- East Apthorpe 1790-1792. Moved to Prebend of Finsbury in 1792
- Nicholas Rigby Baldwin 1792-1825
- John James Watson 1825-1839.
- James Thomas Round 1842-1860

== Prebendaries of Brownswood ==
- Airic
- Richard de Aurivall
- Ralph of Langford Dean of St Paul’s 1138
- William de Costentin
- David of London
- Brand
- Robert de Sandon
- Richard de Stanford
- John de Cheam Bishop of Glasgow, 1259
- Roger de La Legh Archdeacon of Essex by May 1274; Dean of St Paul's from Oct. 1283 to 1285.
- John of Leicester
- Adam de Writele
- Henry of Newark
- Laurence de Fuscis de Bera
- Henry de Saracenis
- Robert de Donnsbrugg ?-1325. Moved to Prebend of Ealdstreet
- Geoffrey de Eyton 1325-1328
- Gerald de Cantelaus 1328-1346
- Ivo de Glynton 1344
- Peter de Wotton 1346-?
- William de Wenlock ?-1392
- Michael de Northburgh junior 1363
- Reginald Braybroke 1392-1394. Moved to Prebend of Finsbury 1394.
- Hugh Cotyngham 1394-1410
- Robert Manfeld Provost of Beverley. 1410-1419
- Thomas de la Pole 1419-1433
- John Burdet 1433-1449
- Robert Kirkham 1449-1468
- John Alcock 1468-1472. Bishop of Rochester 1472.
- William Dudley 1472-1473. Dean of St. George's Chapel 1473
- John Davyson 1473-1485
- Richard Foxe 1485-1487. Bishop of Exeter 1487.
- Thomas Jane 1487-1499. Bishop of Norwich 1499.
- John Perott 1499-?
- Thomas Hulse ?-1531
- William Warham 1515
- Thomas Whitehead 1531-1548
- Gilbert Bourne 1548-1554. Bishop of Bath and Wells 1554.
- Henry Wotton 1554-1561
- Robert Harrington 1561-1610
- John Barkham 1610-1642
- Joseph Crowther 1642-1689
- Thomas Turner 1690-1714
- George Carter 1714-1727
- Samuel Baker 1727-1728. Moved to Prebendary of Ealdland 1728.
- Robert Tyrwhit 1728-1732. Moved to Prebendary of Cantlers 1732.
- Thomas Cartwright 1733-1749.
- Sherlock Willis 1749-1783.
- John Sturges 1783-1807.
- George Secker 1807-1840.
- vacant
- Richard Harvey 1843-1858
- Edward Merrick Goulburn 1859 - 1866

== Prebendaries of Caddington Major ==
- Askyllus
- Roger son of Robert Archdeacon of Middlesex by c. 1108, to before Jan. 1127.
- Richard de Beaumais Bishop of London. Sept. 1152.
- Alexander de Saccavilla
- Ralph de Alta Ripa Archdeacon of Colchester from before Sept. 1186, to after July 1190.
- Alard de Burnham Archdeacon of London ca. 1196 Dean of St. Paul's ca. 1200.
- Robert de Sancte Marie Ecclesia
- Simon of Wells Bishop of Chichester, July 1204.
- Richard de Hegham Archdeacon of Essex by March 1204, to 1215/16 or later.
- Theobald de Valognes Archdeacon of Essex ca. 1221
- Philip de Fauconberg Archdeacon of Huntingdon by 1228
- Ranulph Brito
- Thomas de Anesty Archdeacon of Northumberland from Apr. 1249.
- Philip Lovel
- William of Kilkenny Bishop of Ely, Aug. 1255.
- Alexander of Ferentino
- Fulke Lovell Archdeacon of Colchester ca 1267
- Ralph de Hengham
- Ralph de Hingham ?-1311
- Stephen Segrave ?-1324. Archbishop of Armagh ca. 1324
- John de Manso 1324-1337
- Raymond Pelegrini 1337-1366
- John Rouley 1366-1386
- Adam Davenport ?-1381
- William Hermesthorp 1381
- Richard Clifford senior 1386
- Guy Mone 1386-1397. Bishop of St Davids 1397.
- John Cole 1397-?
- John Doneys 1397
- Richard Clifford junior 1397-1398
- Henry Bowet 1399
- Nicholas Bubwith ?-1406. Bishop of London 1406
- John Luke 1406
- John Brech 1406-1418
- Henry Merston 1418-1433
- Robert Felton 1433-1438
- Thomas Wodeford or Belton 1438-1441. Prebend of Totenhall 1441.
- Fulk Bermyngham 1441-?
- Malcolm Cosyn ?-1467. Prebend in St Stephen's, Westminster 1467
- Henry Sharp 1467-1471. Prebend of Chiswick 1471.
- Thomas Chaundeler 1471-1472
- John Davyson 1472. Prebend of Bishopstone in Salisbury
- John Pemberton 1472-1475
- John Peese 1475-1487
- John Smith 1487-1502
- Pedro de Ayala 1502-1506
- John Salvago 1506-1515, ?-1524
- Christopher Plummer 1514-?
- John Pennand 1524-1529
- William Boleyn 1529-1530. Archdeacon of Winchester 1530 - 1552
- Richard Pate 1530-1542
- Peter Vannes 1542-1563
- John Young 1564-1578. Bishop of Rochester 1578.
- John Flower 1579-1599
- Peter Lilly 1599-1615
- Thomas Westfield 1615-1644. Bishop of Bristol 1642.
- Matthew Nicholas 1660-1661
- John Dolben 1661-1666. Bishop of Rochester 1666.
- William Master 1667-1684
- William Stanley 1684-1731.
- Joseph Steadman 1731-1733.
- Thomas Jackson 1733-1749
- Samuel Nicolls 1749-1756. Prebend of Newington 1756.
- Pulter Forester 1756-1778
- John Sturges 1778-1783. Prebend of Brownswood 1783.
- Benjamin Wheeler 1783.
- Samuel Horsley 1783-1793. Bishop of St. Davids 1788 – 1793. Bishop of Rochester 1793.
- Thomas Winstanley 1794-1823.
- Thomas Gaisford 1823-1855.
- Archibald Montgomery Campbell 1855-1859.

== Prebendaries of Caddington Minor ==
- Theobald possibly Archdeacon of Essex and Prebend of Portpool
- Odo son of Theobald
- Paris Archdeacon of Rochester before Sept. 1150
- William of Ely
- Martin of Pattishall Dean of St Paul’s ca. 1228
- Hugh of London II Archdeacon of Colchester ca 1235
- William de Sancte Marie Ecclesia III
- Robert Passelewe
- John of Bulmer
- Ralph of Ivinghoe
- Ralph de Ivingho c. 1291
- Roger de Waltham
- Thomas Bradwardine ?-1349. Archbishop of Canterbury 1349
- Richard Michel 1349-1362
- William de Navesby 1362-?
- Laurence Allerthorpe ?-1406
- Simon Bache 1406-1414
- William Barton 1414-1419
- Walter Medford 1419-1423
- John Bernyngham 1423-1425
- John Stopyngton 1425-1430
- Thomas Chichele 1430-1467
- Thomas St Just 1467
- Richard Lichfield 1467-1468
- William Dudley 1468-1471. Prebend of Newington 1471
- John Peese 1471-1475. Prebend of Caddington Major 1475
- Richard Freston 1476-1477
- Ralph Shaa 1477-1484
- Edmund Chaderton 1484-1499
- John Treguran 1499-1532
- Thomas Hynde 1532-1558/9
- John Somers ?-1573.
- George Wall 1574-1581
- Godfrey Goldsborough 1581-1598. Bishop of Gloucester 1598
- George Downham 1598-1616
- Thomas Soame 1617-1649
- Christopher Newsted 1660-1663
- Robert Breton 1663-1672
- William Lloyd 1672-1675. Bishop of Llandaff 1674
- Joshua Hodgkis 1676-1726
- Edward Cobden 1726-1764
- Nathaniel Hume 1764-?
- William Wood 1810-1841
- vacant
- Thomas Dale 1843-1846
- Henry Venn 1846-1873
- Charles Broderick Scott 1873 - ????
- F.E. Wigram 1896 - ????
- Berdmore Compton 1897 - ????
- ?
- Gary Piper ?-2013
- David Coleman 2013
- ?
- Sandra McCalla 2021

== Prebendaries of Cantlers ==
The Prebend of Cantlers consisted of a manor in the area now known as Kentish Town.

- Sigar
- Anger
- Audoen
- Hubert Vacca
- Henry of Northampton
- Richard of Ely Archdeacon of Colchester from 1192
- Peter of Ste.-Mère-Eglise
- William de Fauconberg
- William de Raley Bishop of Norwich from 1239
- Roger de Cantilupe
- Walter of Merton Prebend of Finsbury from 1262
- Ralph de Montibus
- William de La Leya
- Antony de Camille
- Henry de Bluntesdon
- Henry, the king's almoner
- William de Ayremynne ?-1315
- Ingelard de Warley 1317
- John Bush 1318-?
- Hugh de Engolisma ?-1332.. Bishop of Carpentras from 1332.
- William Bernardi de Ranato 1332-1333
- Roger Ysarni 1333-?
- Richard de Wentworth 1338. Bishop of London from May 1338.
- Henry de Idesworth 1338-1349
- Roger Holme 1349
- John de la Mare 1349
- Hugh Pelegrini 1350
- Edmund de Grimsby 1350-1354
- William de Waltham 1393-1398
- Thomas de Southam 1398-1404
- Thomas Shapewyke or Horston 1404-1410
- Nicholas Herbury 1410-?
- Robert Clerk ?-1431
- William Gray 1431-1446
- Clement Denston 1446-1452
- Nicholas Sturgeon 1452-1454
- John Waynflete ?-1465
- Robert Ballard 1465-1478
- William Kempe 1478-1523
- Richard Layton 1523-1544
- Richard Layton 1523-1544
- William Layton 1544-1551
- John Bradford 1551-1554
- John Feckenham or Howman 1554-1556. Abbot of Westminster 1556
- George Lilly 1556-1559
- John Mullins 1559-1591
- Sir Edward Stanhope 1591-1608
- Robert Tinley 1608-1616
- John King 1616-1638
- John Tolson 1639-1644
- Walter Jones 1660-1672
- Thomas Henchman 1672-1674
- William Wigan 1674-1700
- Jonas Warley 1700-1722
- Edward Oliver 1722-1732
- Robert Tyrwhit 1732-1742.
- William Gibson 1742-1746
- Edmund Gibson 1746-1771.
- Anthony Hamilton 1771-1812.
- Thomas Randolph 1812-1875

== Prebendaries of Chamberlainwood ==
- Robert [?de Limesey]
- Ralph Gundram
- Raherius
- Geoffrey Constable
- Nicholas son of Clement
- Richard de Umfraville
- Richard de Camera
- Philip de Hadham
- Richard Foliot II Archdeacon of Middlesex by 1248
- John de Chishull I Archdeacon of London by 1263. Dean of St Paul’s by 1268. Bishop of London by 1273
- Warin de Dyre
- Hugh of Collingham
- Solomon of Rochester
- Stephen de Gravesend
- Thomas de Northflete
- Stephen de Gravesend c. 1291
- Thomas de Northflete ?-1317
- John de Middleton
- William de Hoo
- John Barnet ?-1361. Bishop of Worcester 1361
- Fortanerius Vassalli Archbishop of Grado. 1361.
- John de Stretley 1362-1365
- John de Appleby 1365-1366
- John de Edington 1366
- John de Appleby (again) 1366-1389
- Thomas More 1390-?
- John Cokenache ?-1391
- Thomas de Middleton 1391-1396
- Reginald Kentwood 1396-1400
- John Skyftelyng 1401-1406
- John Malverne 1406-1422
- James Cole 1422-1423
- John Preston 1423-1436
- Fulk Bermyngham 1436-1441. Prebend of Caddington Major 1441.
- Gerard Hesil 1441-1443. Prebend of Wenlocksbarn 1443.
- William Booth 1443-1447. Bishop of Coventry and Lichfield 1447. Archbishop of York 1452.
- William Witham 1447-1454
- Edmund Booth 1454-1456. Archdeacon of Stow 1445.
- William Saunders 1456-1472
- John Isaak 1472-1485
- William Lichfield 1485-1517
- William Knight 1517-1541. Bishop of Bath and Wells 1541.
- Andrew Tracy 1542-1545
- William May 1545-1554
- Cuthbert Scott 1554-1556. Bishop of Chester 1556.
- John Fuller 1558
- John Weale 1558-1569
- Thomas Drant 1569-1570
- John Winter 1570-1606
- Ithel Griffith 1606-1616
- Nicholas Felton 1616-1617. Bishop of Bristol 1617.
- Thomas Oates 1618-?
- Thomas Raymond 1623-1631
- William Haywood 1631-1663
- William Master 1663-1667. Prebend of Caddington Major 1667.
- John Wilkins 1667-1668. Bishop of Chester 1668.
- Henry Hibbert 1669-1678
- William Jane 1679-1707
- Thomas Houghton 1707-1718
- Robert Tomlinson 1719-1748.
- Robert Gibson 1748-1781
- William Gibson 1781-1835
- Vacant
- Thomas Henderson 1842-1861.

== Prebendaries of Chiswick ==
- Edmund
- William [de Mareni] Dean of St Paul’s by July 1111
- Nigel of Calne Bishop of Ely from Oct 1133
- Richard de Amanvilla
- Richard FitzNeal Bishop of London from 1189
- William Coroner
- Ralph of Ely Archdeacon of Middlesex c 1198
- Alan
- John Belemains
- William of Bath
- Edmund of Bath
- Richard de Gravesend II Archdeacon of London by 1294
- Richard de Gravesend or Grene c. 1291.
- William de Scotho
- Philip de Weston 1338-?
- William de Retford 1359.
- John Maundour 1373, 1376.
- John de Wendlyngburgh 1377-1395.
- William Bryan 1395-1397.
- Richard Clifford senior 1397-1398. Bishop of Bath and Wells 1400
- Richard Clifford junior 1398-1406.
- Angelo II Acciaiuoli Cardinal. Bishop of Ostia. 1400.
- John Notyngham 1406-1419.
- Thomas de la Pole 1419. Prebend of Brownswood from June 1419
- Richard Clifford junior (again) 1419-1422.
- Nicholas Dixon 1422-1448.
- William Cleve 1448-1469.
- Robert Newbald 1469-?
- John Colville 1469-1471.
- Henry Sharp 1471-1472.
- John Morton 1473-1478.
- Robert Morton 1478-1486. Bishop of Worcester 1486
- Christopher Urswick 1487-?
- Richard Sampson ?-1534.
- Richard Sparcheford 1534-1537.
- Edmund Bonner 1537-1538. Bishop of Hereford 1538.
- Edward Moylle 1539-1554.
- Edward Moylle 1539-1554.
- William Chedsey 1554-1559.
- Gabriel Goodman 1559-1601.
- William Barlow 1601-1608. Bishop of Rochester 1605. Bishop of Lincoln 1608.
- Valentine Cary 1608-? Bishop of Exeter 1621
- John Donne 1622-1631.
- Richard Bayley 1631-1667.
- Richard Perrincheif 1667-1673.
- Charles Smith 1673-1674. Prebend of Pancratius 1674.
- William Beveridge 1674-1708. Bishop of St Asaph 1704
- William Hall 1708-1726.
- William Crowe 1726-1727. Prebend of Pancratius 1727.
- White Kennett 1727-1740.
- Edmund Gibson 1740-1743. Prebend of Mapesbury 1743.
- Thomas Church 1744-1756.
- Edmund Tyrwhit 1756-1788.
- John Wright 1788-1793.
- George Gregory 1793-1798.
- Thomas Parkinson 1798-1830.
- John Smith 1830-1859.
- J H Hamilton -1872
- Daniel Wilson 1872-

== Prebendaries of Consumpta-Per-Mare ==
- Robert Losinga Bishop of Hereford 1079
- William Giffard
- Osbern
- Thurstan
- Ranulph Patin
- Richard [?Foliot I]
- Gilbert Banastre
- Alexander of Swerford
- Silvester de Everdon Bishop of Carlisle 1247
- William La Feite
- William of Kilkenny Bishop of Ely 1255
- Philip de Eya
- William Passemer
- Thomas Eswy
- John Renger
- Simon de Stanbregg
- Philip de Willoughby
- Gilbert de Strattone
- John de Berewik
- John de Berewyk c. 1291.
- Peter de Tylloy ?-1327.
- Richard de Brencheslee 1327-1337.
- William de Everdon 1337-?
- Richard de Piriton 1366.
- John Paxton ?-1389.
- Robert Sutton 1389-?
- John Elvet 1395.
- John Yerdeburgh 1395-1401.
- Robert de Northwell 1401-1404.
- Robert Seynkele 1404.
- William Burton 1404-1421.
- William Booth 1421-1443. Prebend of Chamberlainwood 1443. Archbishop of York 1452.
- William Sprever 1443-1460.
- Henry Sharp 1460-1464.
- Robert Morton 1464-1481.
- William Bolton 1481-1488.
- Henry Sutton 1488-1495.
- John Pickering 1495-1505. Prebend of Newington 1505.
- Richard Dudley 1505-1536.
- Thomas Thornham 1536-1548.
- Thomas Thornham 1536-1548.
- John Leyff 1548-1557.
- William Musmare 1557-1560.
- John Atherton 1562-1598.
- Robert Temple 1592.
- William Foxe 1594. Prebend of Harleston June 1594
- David Dee 1598.
- Henry Wayland 1598-1614.
- Richard Francklin 1614-?
- Alexander Strange 1637-1650.
- Thomas Gale 1676-1702.
- Thomas Cook 1702-1731.
- John Thomas 1731-1747. Bishop of Peterborough 1747
- James Johnson 1748-1752. Bishop of Gloucester 1752
- Philip Yonge 1754-? Bishop of Bristol 1758, Bishop of Norwich 1761
- Hon. Shute Barrington 1768-1776. Bishop of Llandaff 1769
- John Douglas 1776-1787.
- Richard Farmer 1788-1797.
- Charles Moss 1797-1807. Bishop of Oxford 1807
- Thomas Hughes 1807-1833.
- James Tate 1833-1843.
- Ernest Hawkins 1844-1865.

== Prebendaries of Ealdland ==
- Quintilian
- Cyprian son of Quintilian
- Geoffrey
- Ailward Archdeacon of Colchester
- Hugh of London I
- Laurence
- John of London
- Roger Niger Archdeacon of Colchester 1218 - 1229
- Richard de Wendover alias Physicus (Physician of pope Gregory IX 1227-1241)
- John de Gatesdene
- Fulk Basset Archdeacon of Middlesex Apr. 1244
- Robert de Esthall Archdeacon of Worcester
- Robert of Scarborough
- John de Selvestone
- John de Selvestone c. 1291.
- Philip de Barton
- ? Pontius de Podio Barzaco ?-1332.
- Itherius de Concoreto 1337.
- John de Thoresby 1339-?
- John de St Paul ?-1349. Archbishop of Dublin 1349.
- David de Wollore 1349-1370.
- Michael de Northburgh senior 1349.
- John de Freton 1370-1376.
- Edward Cherdestok 1376-?
- John Dysseford ?-1412.
- John Bathe 1412-1433.
- Stephen Wilton 1433-1450.
- Alexander Altham 1450-1458.
- Roger Radclyffe 1458-1471.
- Richard Martyn 1471-1472.
- Benedict Burgh 1472-1476.
- William Moreland 1476-1492.
- Adriano Castellesi 1492-? Bishop of Hereford 1502
- Peter Carmelian ?-1526.
- William Bennet 1526-1533.
- Hugh Baker 1533-1536.
- John Keale 1536-1539.
- John Tendring 1539-1548.
- John Tendring 1539-1548.
- William Ibrye 1548-1557.
- John Standish 1557-1570.
- John Wyllocke 1570-1585.
- William Chatburne 1585-?
- Giles Bury 1627-?
- John Cooke 1661-?
- Roger Wilford 1665-?
- John Tillotson 1675-1678. Prebend of Oxgate 1678
- Samuel Masters 1678-1693.
- John Younger 1693-1728.
- Samuel Baker 1728-1749.
- Richard Terrick 1749-1757. Bishop of Peterborough 1757
- John Taylor 1757-1766.
- Thomas Winstanley 1766-1789.
- Robert Lowth 1789-1822.
- John Honywood Randolph 1822-1868.

== Prebendaries of Ealdstreet ==
- Ansketin or Ansketil
- Fulcher Bishop of Lisieux 1102
- Hamo de Rem
- Theodoric Junior
- Godfrey de Luci Bishop of Winchester 1189
- Peter de Waltham Archdeacon of London ca 1192
- William of Sainte-Mère-Église Bishop of London 1198
- Alan de Hertilande
- Hugh of Wells Archdeacon of Wells 1204-1209, Bishop of Lincoln 1209
- Bartholomew Archdeacon of Winchester 1213
- Hugh de Sancto Edmundo Archdeacon of Essex 1248. Archdeacon of Colchester 1257
- Amaury de Montfort
- William de Sardene
- William de Sardene c. 1291.
- Thomas Cobham ?-1317. Bishop of Worcester 1317
- Richard de Elsfield 1317-?
- Rigaud de Asserio 1317-1319.
- Vitalis de Furno Card. pr. of SS. Silvester et Martinus. 1317-?
- Geoffrey de Eyton 1325.
- Robert de Donnsbrugg 1325.
- Adam Murimuth senior 1325-1328.
- Henry de Shorne 1327-?
- Roger de Hales 1328-?
- John de Eccleshale
- Thomas de Aston ?-1399.
- John Kington 1399-?
- Nicholas Bubwith 1401.
- John Bremore ?-1418.
- John Ixworth senior 1418-1419. Prebend of Reculversland 1419.
- Peter Hynewyk 1419-1426.
- John Piquet 1426-1432.
- Alan Kirketon 1432-1443.
- Philip ap Rees 1443-1445.
- William Byconyll 1445-1448.
- Roger Keyes 1448-1449.
- Richard Langstrother 1449-1467.
- Walter Hert 1467-1484.
- John Smith 1484-1487. Prebend of Caddington Major 1487.
- Richard Terynden 1487-1488.
- John Wyppyll 1488-?
- Thomas Norbury ?-1510.
- Hugh Saunders or Breakspear 1510-1517. Prebend of Broomesbury 1517.
- Thomas Bennet 1517-1521. Prebend of Rugmere 1521.
- John Ashwell 1521-1541.
- Robert Higdon 1541-1544.
- John Crooke 1544-1547.
- John Warner 1547-1566.
- Richard Rogers 1566-?
- Robert Newman 1594, 1611.
- John Spencer 1612-1614.
- Thomas Westfield 1614-1615. Prebend of Caddington Major 1615.
- William Wilson 1615.
- John Whiting 1615-1625.
- Richard Taylor 1625-?
- William Walwyn 1660-?
- Henry Halsted 1671-1728.
- William Butler 1729-1736.
- Richard Biscoe 1736-1748.
- Joseph Sims 1748-1776.
- Samuel Carr 1776-1794.
- Matthew Field 1794-1796.
- Robert Watts 1797-1842.
- Lancelot Sharpe 1843-1851.
- Frederick Charles Cook 1855-1865.

== Prebendaries of Finsbury ==
- Levegar
- Robert son of Generannus
- Ralph
- Walter son of Walter
- John of Kent
- Simon of Langton
- Philip Fortis Brachii
- Henry de Cornhill Dean of St Paul’s 1243
- Richard Talbot
- Walter de Merton Bishop of Rochester 1274
- William de Ewelle
- William de Ewell 1288, 1301.
- Robert de Baldock senior ?-1326.
- Rhys ap Howel 1326-?
- Thomas de Astley 1327-1349.
- John Cok 1349-1358.
- Richard de Aston 1358-?
- William Fullborne ?-1391.
- Roger Albryghton 1391-1393.
- John de Burton 1393-1394.
- Reginald Braybroke 1394-1405.
- Robert Clerk 1405-?
- Nicholas Herbury ?-1425.
- Richard Caudray 1425-1458.
- James Stanley 1458-1481.
- Ralph Langley 1481-?
- John Hill 1493.
- Robert Sherborne B.M. 1493-1494.
- Geoffrey Simeon 1494-?
- William Horsey ?-1513.
- James FitzJames 1513-1519.
- Richard Pace 1519-1527.
- Richard Woleman 1527-1537.
- John Spendlove 1537-1554.
- Edward Moylle 1554-1558.
- Thomas Collyer 1558-1559.
- John Spendlove (again) ?-1581.
- Samuel Aylmer 1581-1583.
- Theophilus Aylmer 1583-1626.
- George Coke 1626-1636. Bishop of Bristol 1633. Bishop of Hereford 1636
- Thomas Wykes 1636-?
- William Collingwood 1660-1666.
- William Johnson 1666-1667.
- John Hall 1667-1707.
- William Whitfield 1707-1717.
- Henry Lambe 1717-1729.
- Thomas Stamper 1729-1733.
- Lancelot Jackson 1734-1745.
- Christopher Wilson 1745-1792. Bishop of Bristol 1783.
- East Apthorpe 1792-1816.
- Hon. Hugh Percy 1816-1856. Bishop of Rochester 1827. Bishop of Carlisle 1828
- Michael Gibbs 1856-1882.

== Prebendaries of Harleston ==
- Harlesden, Middlesex
- Robert
- Hugh de Boklande
- Hugh II
- Hugh III
- Nicholas Scriba
- Godfrey
- Richard de Stortford
- Gilbert de Plesseto
- William de Sancte Marie Ecclesia I
- John of Bulmer
- William La Feite
- Henry Lovel
- Hugh de Kendale
- Ralph de Malling Archdeacon of Middlesex 1295
- Ralph de Malling 1295-1301.
- Walter de Thorp ?-1319/20.
- Michael de Bereham 1318.
- William de Boudon ?-1336.
- Thomas Durant 1336-?
- Adam Murimuth junior
- John de Amesbury ?-1349.
- John Wade 1349-?
- Robert Manfeld 1398-1399.
- Richard Getingdon ?-1398.
- Walter Malet 1398-1404.
- John Preston 1404-1423.
- James Cole 1423-1439
- John Prentys 1439-1445
- Henry Sever 1445-1471.
- John Tapton 1471-1485.
- Walter Oudeby 1485-1498.
- John Perott 1498-1499. Prebendary of Brownswood 1499.
- Edward Vaughan 1499-1503.
- John Smith 1503-1539/40.
- John Crayford 1540-1548.
- John Crayford 1540-1548.
- John Hodgkins Suffragan Bishop of Bedford. 1548-1554.
- Nicholas Harpsfield 1554-1559.
- John Hodgkins Suffragan Bishop of Bedford. (again) ?-1560.
- Humphrey Alcockson 1560-1561.
- David Kempe 1561-1582.
- Anthony Corano or Corro 1582-1591.
- George Dickins 1591-1594.
- Robert Temple 1594-1597.
- Thomas Montford 1597-1633.
- Edward Layfield 1633-1680.
- John Wells 1680-1685.
- Benjamin Calamy 1685-1686.
- Zacchaeus Isham 1686-1688. Prebend of Totenhall 1688.
- Samuel Freeman 1688-1707.
- Thomas Price 1707-1714.
- George Bell 1714-1734.
- Hugh Wyatt 1734-1762.
- John Jortin 1762-1770.
- Peter Stephen Goddard 1770-1781.
- Joseph Wharton 1782-1800.
- Thomas Briggs 1800-1802. Prebend of Newington 1802.
- Thomas Rennell 1802-1840.
- vacant
- James William Bellamy 1843-1874.
- Charles Adolphus Row 1874-1896

== Prebendaries of Holbourn ==
- Walter
- Richard [Ruffus I]
- Richard Junior
- Robert Meldensis
- Alard de Burnham
- William Brunus
- Eustace of Fauconberg Bishop of London 1221
- Peter II de Colmieu Archbishop of Rouen 1237
- Alexander of Hales
- William de Wellebourne
- John Le Franceis
- Robert Burnell Bishop of Bath and Wells 1275
- Ralph Baldock Archdeacon of Middlesex 1278
- Nicholas Lovetot
- Walter Langton Bishop of Coventry and Lichfield 1296
- William Greenfield Archbishop of York 1306
- Thomas de Southwark 1306-1325.
- John de Middleton 1325-? Prebend of Chamberlainwood ca. 1328
- Henry de Idesworth Prebend of Cantlers 1338
- Richard de Chaddesley
- William de Stowe 1351.
- Walter de Alderbury 1361, 1366.
- William de Chuseldon 1374.
- Thomas Brightwell ?-1390.
- Richard de Carleton 1390-1393.
- William Deghere 1390-?
- Walter Cook 1393-1395.
- Andrew Baret May 1395. Bishop of Llandaff by June 1395
- Walter Cook (again) 1395-1423.
- David Price 1423-1438.
- Thomas Beckington 1438-1443. Bishop of Bath and Wells 1443
- John Kette 1444-1455.
- John Hales 1455-1459. Bishop of Coventry and Lichfield 1459
- Thomas Manning 1459-1464.
- John Crall or Sudbury 1464-1479.
- Thomas Brent 1479-1511.
- John Young 1511-1512. Prebend of Newington 1512
- John Adams 1512-1521. Prebend of Mora 1521
- John Bulgyn 1521-1534.
- William Greene 1534-1540.
- Henry Cole 1540-1541. Prebend of Sneating 1541
- William Buckmaster 1541–1545.
- Robert Cousyn 1545-1554. Prebend of Mora 1554
- John Harpsfield 1554-1558. Prebend of Mapesbury 1558
- James Grindal 1561-1575.
- Edward Layfield 1575-1583.
- Richard Vaughan 1583-1595. Bishop of Bangor 1595
- Thomas Puckering 1596-1627.
- Thomas Worrall 1627-1639.
- John Hansley 1640-1667.
- John Lake 1667-1682. Bishop of Sodor and Man 1682
- Robert Corey 1683-1705.
- Samuel Edgeley 1705-1732.
- John Wilcox 1732-1762.
- William Parker 1762-1776.
- Luke Heslop 1776-1825.
- Henry Handley Norris 1825-1850.
- Herbert Kynaston 1853-1878.

== Prebendaries of Hoxton ==
- Osbern Masculus
- Geoffrey Masculus
- Hugh
- Henry son of Hugh
- John Comyn Archdeacon of Bath 1166 and Archbishop of Dublin 1181
- Osbert de Camera
- Peter of Blois Archdeacon of London
- Walter Archdeacon of London
- Gervase of Howbridge
- Thomas de Urso
- Peter de Newport Archdeacon of London
- John Maunsel also Prebend of Caddington Minor and Totenhall
- John de Wengham c. 1291.
- John Maunsel
- Edmund Trussel 1330, 1332.
- Richard Vaghan 1348.
- William de Bradley ?-1361.
- Richard de Ravenser 1361-1363. Prebendary of Empingham in Lincoln Cathedral 1363
- John de Ludham 1363-?
- Thomas Chaloner 1400.
- Thomas Crocer ?-1411.
- Thomas Feriby 1411-1420.
- Peter de Alcobasso 1420-1427.
- Richard Moresby 1427-1443.
- John Derby 1443-1468.
- John Gunthorpe 1468-1472. Prebendary of Wenlocksbam 1472
- Richard Martin 1472-1482. Bishop of St Davids 1482
- John de Gigliis 1482-1490. Prebendary of Mora 1490
- John Forster Sch.Th. 1490-1512.
- Thomas Sewell 1512-1521. Prebendary of Pancratius 1521
- Thomas Bele Bishop of Lydda. 1521-1530.
- John Breerton 1530-1542.
- John Breerton 1530-1542.
- Nicholas Wilson 1542-1548.
- William Clyff 1548-1558.
- Hugh Evans 1558-1580.
- John Duffield 1580-?
- Henry Hamond 1585. Prebendary of Wenlocksbam Nov 1585
- George Dickins 1585-1591. Prebend of Harleston 1591.
- William Hutchinson 1591-1606.
- John Simpson 1606-1633.
- Robert Cottesford 1633-?
- Thomas Holbech 1660-1680.
- Thomas Beaumont 1681-1711.
- John Gohier 1711-?
- Christopher Baynes 1713-1718.
- Francis Astrey 1718-1766.
- James Waller 1766-1771. Prebend of Mora 1771.
- Townsend Andrews 1771-1811.
- Edward Coplestone 1812-1849.
- Charles Mackenzie 1852-1888.

== Prebendaries of Islington ==
- Algar son of Dereman
- Ulfran
- Richard
- Henry
- Josceline de Bohon Bishop of Salisbury 1142
- Robert of Chichester Bishop of Exeter 1155
- John of Greenford Bishop of Chichester 1174
- Richer de Andelys
- Robert Banastre
- Robert [du Val]
- Peter of Ste.-Mère-Eglise
- Ralph Furnis
- Geoffrey de Lucy Archdeacon of London and Dean of St Paul’s
- William de Haverhull
- Fulke Lovell Prebend of Caddington Major ca 1258
- Philip Lovel
- Hugh de Dodingham
- Peter de Rivaux
- Ralph de Dunion
- William de Montfort
- Ralph Baldock Archdeacon of Middlesex 1278 Dean of St Pauls 1294
- John de Luco c. 1291.
- William de Sardene
- Ralph Baldock Bishop of London 1304
- Richard Newport Bishop of London 1317
- Thomas de Astley Prebend of Finsbury from 1327
- Thomas de Charlton ?-1327. Bishop of Hereford 1327
- Gerald de Engolisma 1327-?
- Robert de Reddeswell
- Humphrey de Hastanges 1343-1349.
- William de Rothwell 1351-1359.
- William de Loughburgh 1359-?
- John de Swynleigh 1361-1366.
- William de Hyndelee 1366-1368.
- John de Swynleigh (again) 1368-?
- Adam Holme ?-1399.
- William Stortford 1399-1416.
- Richard Bruton 1416-1418.
- Richard Clifford junior 1418-1419. Prebend of Chiswick 1419
- John Ryder 1419-1443.
- William Briggeford 1443-1447. Prebend of Newington 1447.
- William Say 1447-1451.
- Richard Ewen 1451-1459. Prebend of Mapesbury 1459.
- James Goldwell 1459-1472. Bishop of Norwich 1472.
- John Morton 1472-1473. Prebend of Chiswick 1473.
- William Kempe 1473-1478. Prebend of Cantlers 1478.
- Ralph Byrd 1478-1483.
- George Wandysford 1483-1497.
- William Haryndon 1497-1523.
- Geoffrey Wharton 1523-1529.
- Robert Ridley 1529-1536.
- John Spendlove 1536-1537. Prebend of Finsbury 1537.
- Eliseus Ambrose 1537-?
- Elisha Ambrose 1537-?
- Richard Fletcher 1572-1589. Bishop of Bristol 1589.
- Thomas Marten 1589-1603.
- Simon Rogers 1603-1604.
- William Rogerson 1604-1638.
- Grenado Chester 1638-1646/7.
- William Hall 1660-1662.
- Mark Frank 1662-1664.
- John Hall 1664-1667. Prebend of Finsbury 1667.
- Edward Stillingfleet 1667-1672. Prebend of Newington 1672.
- William Holder 1672-1698.
- Edmund Kidby 1698-1713.
- Ptolomy James 1713-1729.
- Robert Drew 1729-1746.
- Joseph Butler 1746-1798.
- Robert Nares 1798-1829.
- William Hale Hale 1829-1846.
- Derwent Coleridge 1846-1883.

== Prebendaries of Mapesbury ==
- Albert Lotaringus
- Hugh son of Albert
- Baldwin
- Geoffrey Plantagenet Bishop of Lincoln ca 1173
- Walter Map
- Richard [de Fincheleya]
- Thomas of Stortford
- Peter of Bordeaux
- Peter Chaceporc
- William de York Bishop of Salisbury 1247.
- Stephen de Sandwic Archdeacon of Essex 1253
- Robert Parvus
- John Soudan
- Giles Filliol Archdeacon of Colchester by March 1287, to after May 1299.
- Peter de Dene 1309.
- John de Bedford
- Bego de Cavomonte 1308-?
- ? Elias Talleyrand de Périgord 1320-?
- Robert de Canterbury ?-1333.
- John de Claydon ?-1351/2.
- Michael Northburgh senior 1351-1354. Bishop of London 1354.
- Richard de Norwich 1354-1361.
- John Bokyngham 1361-1362. Bishop of Lincoln 1362.
- Roger le Scrope 1375-?
- William Pakyngton ?-1390.
- Thomas Stowe 1390-1405.
- Richard de Kingston 1405-1418.
- Robert Rothbury 1419-?
- John Bernyngham 1425-1453. Prebend of Oxgate 1453.
- Lawrence Booth 1453-1456. Prebendary of Totenhall 1456. Archbishop of York 1476.
- John Arundel 1456-1459. Bishop of Chichester 1459.
- Richard Ewen 1459-1464.
- John Booth 1464-1465. Bishop of Exeter 1465.
- John Wodde 1465-1475.
- John Bourchier 1475-1495.
- John Hill 1495-?
- John Withers ?-1534.
- John Spendlove 1534.
- William Wellyfed 1534.
- Thomas Bedyll 1534.
- William Wellyfed (again) 1534-1541.
- Gabriel Dunne 1541-1558.
- Gabriel Dunne 1541-1558.
- John Harpsfield 1558-1559.
- John Pilkington 1559-1562.
- John Ebden 1562-1596.
- John Ebden 1596-1598.
- Leonard Chambers 1598.
- Samuel Harsnett 1598-1609. Bishop of Chichester 1609.
- John Bancroft 1609-1632. Bishop of Oxford 1632.
- William Bray 1632-1643.
- Francis Hall 1660-1681.
- Thomas Turner 1682-1690. Prebendary of Brownswood 1690.
- Edward Norton 1690-1712.
- George Jackson 1712-1719.
- Edmund Chishull 1719-1733.
- Edmund Simpson 1733-1743.
- Edmund Gibson 1743-1746. Prebend of Cantlers 1746.
- Walter Walker Ward 1747-1755.
- Nicholas Webb 1755-1775.
- Richard Beadon 1775-1802. Bishop of Gloucester 1789 and Bishop of Bath and Wells 1802.
- Joseph Eyre 1802-1816.
- Herbert Oakeley 1816-1825. Prebendary of Wenlocksbarn 1825.
- Jonathan Tyers Barrett 1825-1851.
- William Windsor Berry 1853-1867.

== Prebendaries of Mora ==
- Nigel Medicus
- Everard of Calne Bishop of Norwich 1121.
- William of Calne
- Henry son of Robert de Sigillo
- Alan the chaplain
- Peter of Ste.-Mère-Eglise
- William the Angevin
- Philip de Fauconberg Prebend of Caddington Major between June 1225 and Oct. 1228.
- Thomas de Fauconberg Archdeacon of Essex by 1228.
- Richard Talbot
- Walter Chausehose
- Philip de Eya
- John de Chishull II Archdeacon of Colchester by 1304
- John de Chishull c. 1291.
- William de Meleford ?-1336.
- Robert de Stratford Sch.Th. 1336-1337. Bishop of Chichester 1337.
- Richard Bentworth 1337-1338. Prebend of Cantlers 1338.
- William de Kyldesby 1338-?
- Nicholas de Hethe 1343-1363.
- Paul de Monte Florum
- Simon Islip ?-1349.
- John Aleyne 1361
- William Wynel of Wenlock 1363-1364.
- Henry de Snayth 1364-?
- Thomas de Horton 1382. Prebend of Wenlocksbarn by 1389
- Thomas de Eure ?-1400.
- John Ethenham 1400-1438.
- Edmund Tebbot 1438-1440.
- Walter Sherrington 1440-1449.
- John Kirkeby 1449-1451.
- Thomas Purbior 1451-1469.
- William Russell 1469-?
- Thomas Winterborne 1469-1473. Prebend of Totenhall
- Thomas Graunt 1473-1474.
- John Russell 1474-1476. Bishop of Rochester 1476.
- Edmund Audley 1476-1480. Bishop of Rochester 1480.
- Lionel Woodville 1480-1481.
- John Forster 1481-1490.
- Giovanni de’ Gigli 1490-1497. Bishop of Worcester 1497.
- Robert Sherborne 1497-1505. Bishop of St Davids 1505.
- John Colet 1505-1519.
- Thomas Hede 1519-1521.
- John Adams 1521-1524.
- Robert Ridley 1524-1527. Prebend of Pancratius 1527.
- John Tunstal 1527-1534.
- Thomas Barret 1534-1544.
- Thomas Barret 1534-1544.
- William Darbyshire 1544-1551.
- Edmund West 1551-1554.
- Robert Cousyn 1554-1559.
- John Veron 1559-1563.
- Robert Crowley 1563-1565.
- William Palmer 1565-1574.
- John Walker 1574-1588.
- Thomas White 1588-1624.
- Thomas Winniffe 1624-1642. Bishop of Lincoln 1642.
- John Hacket 1642-1661. Bishop of Coventry and Lichfield 1661.
- John Pritchett 1662-1681. Bishop of Gloucester
- Charles Alston 1681-1714.
- John Wyvill 1714.
- George Bell 1714-?
- Lancelot Smith 1717-1737.
- Fifield Allen 1738-1743. Prebend of Pancratius 1743.
- Richard Grey 1743-1771.
- Anthony Hamilton 1771. Prebend of Cantlers 1771
- James Waller 1771-1795.
- Thomas Stinton 1795-1797.
- Robert Porteus 1797-1803.
- Henry Wintour 1803-1804.
- William Herringham 1804-1819.
- Samuel Gauntlett 1819-1822.
- Joseph Holden Pott 1822-1847.
- Thomas Robinson 1847-1856.
- Charles Marshall 1856-1883.

== Prebendaries of Nesden ==
- Neasden
- Reinger Archdeacon of London 1102
- Wymund
- Roger de Clinton Bishop of Chester 1129.
- William de Vere Bishop of Hereford 1186
- William of Northall Bishop of Worcester 1186
- Ralph Foliot Archdeacon of Hereford 1182
- Benedict of Sausetun
- William of Purleigh
- Richard de Wendover alias Physicus Prebend of Rugmere 1238
- Hugh de Pateshull Bishop of Coventry and Lichfield 1240.
- Conrad
- Robert Passelewe
- William of Louth Bishop of Ely 1290
- Hugh of Cressingham
- Hugh de Kersingham c. 1291.
- John de Swinfield
- Robert de Burghash
- John de Colchester 1326.
- Adam Murimuth senior 1328-?
- Richard de Plessis
- Richard de Skidby 1366.
- Thomas de Brantingham ?-1370. Bishop of Exeter 1370
- Bartholomew Sidey 1370-?
- Simon Staynton ?-1395.
- Nicholas Braybroke 1395-1400.
- John Drewery or Salisbury 1400-?
- William Brewster 1442-1465.
- John Walter 1465-1467.
- Richard Luke 1467-1484.
- John Aleyne or Carver 1484-1497. Archdeacon of Middlesex
- Edward Underwood 1497-1504.
- William Malhom 1504-1517.
- Rowland Philippes 1517-?
- Brian Higdon ?-1539.
- William Ermested 1539-1558.
- Richard Marshall ?-1560.
- Michael Fleming 1561-1591.
- John Fox 1591-1623.
- Thomas Wilson 1623-?
- Matthew Day 1660-1663.
- Richard Henchman 1663-1667. Prebend of Pancratius 1667.
- Samuel Wilkinson 1668-1670.
- Thomas Leader 1671-1678.
- William Sill 1678. Prebend of Pancratius 1678.
- Edward Norton 1679-1690. Prebend of Mapesbury 1690.
- Wright Burdett 1690-1694.
- William Whitfield 1695-1699. Prebend of Wilsden 1699.
- Henry Roby 1699-1707.
- Joshua Burton 1707.
- William Hawkins 1707-1736.
- John Heylin 1736-1759.
- Thomas Rayne 1759-1789.
- Richard Ormerod 1789-1792.
- Thomas Jackson 1792-1797.
- Henry William Majendie 1798-1809. Bishop of Chester 1800. Bishop of Bangor 1809
- Hon. Gerald Valerian Wellesley 1809-1827.
- Robert James Carr Bishop of Chichester. 1827-1831.
- Sydney Smith 1831-1845.
- Charles Browne Dalton 1845-1893.

== Prebendaries of Newington ==
- Ailward son of Sired
- Fulk
- Walter de Belmeis (of Beaumais)
- Gilbert Foliot II Archdeacon of Middlesex
- John de Garland
- William Comin
- Ranulph de Bisacia
- William of York Prebend of Mapesbury, 1242.
- John de Ramesey
- Henry Wingham I Bishop of London 1260.
- Henry de Wengham II Archdeacon of Middlesex 1262
- Thomas Ingoldsthorpe Archdeacon of Middlesex 1268 Dean of St Paul’s
- Ralph Baldock Archdeacon of Middlesex 1278 Dean of St Paul’s 1294, Bishop of London 1304
- John Sandale ?-1316. Bishop of Winchester 1316
- Vitalis de Testa 1316-1322.
- Roger de Northburgh 1317-1319.
- John de Everdon 1322-?
- Roger de Stretton D.Th.
- Thomas de Lynton 1381-1387.
- John Barnet junior 1387-1391.
- Thomas More 1391-1421.
- John Langton 1425-1447. Bishop of St Davids 1447.
- William Briggeford 1447-?
- William Say ?-1464.
- John Chedworth 1464-1471.
- William Dudley 1471-1472. Prebend of Brownswood 1472.
- Richard Lichfield 1472-1497.
- Hugh Oldham 1497-1504. Bishop of Exeter 1504.
- John Pickering 1505-1512.
- John Young 1512-1516.
- William Warham 1516-1557.
- William Warham 1516-1557.
- John Boxall 1558-1560.
- Thomas Penny 1560-1577.
- Robert King 1577-1584.
- Hugh Lloyd 1584-1601.
- Zachary Pasfield 1601-1616.
- Richard Cluet 1616-1620.
- William Pritchard 1620-1629.
- Thomas Turner 1629-1672.
- Edward Stillingfleet 1672-1689. Bishop of Worcester 1689.
- John Tillotson 1689-1691. Archbishop of Canterbury 1691
- John Hunt 1691-1703.
- John Millington 1703-1728.
- Joseph Smith 1728-1756.
- Samuel Nicolls 1756-1763.
- Charles Weston 1763-1801.
- Thomas Briggs 1802-1831.
- John Lonsdale 1831-1843. Bishop of Lichfield 1843.
- Robert William Browne 1845-1860.
- ?
- George Hodson 1883-1904.
- Henry Luke Paget 1904-1906.
- Wilson Carlile 1906-
- ?
- David Paton ?-2013
- Rosemia Brown 2013

== Prebendaries of Oxgate ==
- Arthur
- Nicholas Crocemannus
- Nicholas Archdeacon of London 1162
- Richard de Windesor
- Roger the chaplain
- Godfrey of Norfolk
- Aymer de Valence alias de Lusignan Bishop of Winchester 1260
- Robert Winchelsey Archdeacon of Essex 1288
- Reyner Lombardus
- Laurence de Fuscis de Bera Archdeacon of Essex.
- Aldebrand Riccardi de Militiis Archdeacon of Essex 1297
- Richard Riccardi de Militiis
- William Ayermin 1315-1325. Bishop of Norwich 1325
- Geoffrey de Eyton 1325. Prebend of Ealdstreet 1325
- William de Reynham 1327-?
- Adam de Limbergh ?-1331.
- John de Woodford 1331-?
- Richard de Murimuth 1339-?
- Edmund de la Beche 1339-1340.
- Thomas Hatfield ?-1345. Bishop of Durham 1345
- William de Ludeford 1345-1347.
- Nicholas de Stanwey 1347-?
- Richard de Bury 1354-?
- William of Wykeham 1361.
- John de Brinkele 1361-?
- John de Newport 1366.
- Thomas de Aston 1374.
- John Donewych ?-1392.
- William Eyremynne 1392-1401.
- Henry Merston 1401-1405.
- John Martyn 1405-1419.
- William Buckingham 1419-1427.
- Thomas Pulter 1427-1449.
- Lawrence Booth 1449-1453. Prebend of Weldland 1453. Archbishop of York 1476.
- John Bernyngham 1453-1457.
- John Druell 1457-1467.
- William Wylde 1467-1477. Prebend of Broomesbury 1477.
- Walter Bate 1477-1479.
- Edmund Albone 1479-1481.
- William Talbot 1481-?
- Thomas Hobbys ?-1509.
- John Prat 1509-1513.
- Polydore Vergil or Castellensis 1513-1555.
- John Braban 1555-1565.
- Edmund Bunney 1565-1618.
- William Paske 1618-1639.
- John Hansley 1639-1640. Prebend of Holbourn 1640.
- Robert Adams 1640-?
- John Barwick 1661-1664.
- William Sancroft 1664-1678. Archbishop of Canterbury 1678
- John Tillotson 1678-1689.
- Lawrence Newton 1690-1691.
- Thomas Felstead 1691-1711.
- Michael Stanhope 1711-1737.
- George Walker 1737-1771.
- Henry Green 1772-1797.
- Samuel Glasse 1797-1812.
- Richard Lendon 1812-1833.
- William Parker 1833-1843.
- Thomas Boyles Murray 1843-1860.

== Prebendaries of Pancratius ==
St Pancras

- Osbern de Auco
- Robert de Auco
- John of Canterbury alias Bellesmains Bishop of Poitiers 1162
- William de Belmeis II (of Beaumais)
- John de Sancto Laurentio
- Luke the chaplain Archbishop of Dublin 1228
- William de Lichefeld
- Hugh de Mortuo Mari
- Antony Bek Prebend of Totenhall after 1280.
- Richard Swinefield Archdeacon of London 1281
- Robert de Ros II
- Robert de Ross c. 1291.
- William de Bray 1324.
- Richard de Feriby
- Henry de Lutiberugh ?-1363.
- Ralph de Daventry 1363.
- John Cruse ?-1363.
- Henry de Wakefield 1363-1369.
- Thomas Strete de Knesworth 1369-1390.
- William Bryan 1390-1395. Prebend of Chiswick 1395.
- John Sileby 1395-1417.
- Richard Clifford junior 1417-1418. Prebend of Islington 1418.
- John Ryder 1418-1419. Prebend of Islington 1419.
- John Ixworth senior 1419-1431.
- John Ixworth junior 1431-1447.
- Roger Martyn 1447-?
- Thomas Gawge ?-1470.
- Ralph Byrd 1470-1478. Prebend of Islington 1478.
- John Barville 1478-1481/2.
- Thomas Dulting ?-1494.
- William Whetley 1494-?
- John Fisher ?-1511.
- John Davis 1511-1521.
- Thomas Sewell 1521-1527.
- Robert Ridley 1527-1529. Prebend of Islington 1529.
- John Royston 1529-1551.
- John Rogers 1551-1553.
- Thomas Chetham Bishop of Sidon. 1553-1558.
- Robert Willanton 1558-1559.
- William Alley 1560-1562. Bishop of Exeter
- James Calfhill 1562-1570.
- Thomas Sampson 1570-1589.
- Lancelot Andrewes 1589-1609. Bishop of Chichester 1605
- Roger Fenton 1609-1616.
- Henry King 1616-1641. Bishop of Chichester 1641.
- Richard Steward 1642-1651.
- Philip King 1660-1666.
- Richard Henchman 1667-1672.
- William Wigan 1672-1674. Prebend of Cantlers 1674.
- Charles Smith 1674-1678.
- William Sill 1678-1681. Prebend of Westminster 1681
- William Sherlock 1681-1707.
- James Williams 1707-1727.
- William Crowe 1727-1743.
- Fifield Allen 1743-1764.
- John Harris 1764-1794.
- William Paley 1794-1805.
- William Beloe 1805-1817.
- Arthur Robinson Chauvel 1817-1847.
- Thomas Bowdler 1849-1856.
- John Hampden Gurney 1857-1862.

== Prebendaries of Portpool ==
See Portpool

- Theobald
- Astan
- Robert son of Wulfred
- Gilbert
- Robert de Clifford
- William de La Fere
- William Heremita
- Roger de Orsett
- Edmund Brito
- Arcadulfus Burgund'
- Philip son of John son of Geoffrey
- Robert de Stowe
- Dionysius de Crienciis
- Gilbert de Segrave
- Dionysius de Crienciis c. 1291.
- Gilbert Segrave Bishop of London 1313
- Robert Stratford Bishop of Chichester 1337
- Thomas de Segrave ?-1338.
- Geoffrey le Scrope 1338-?
- William de Kyldesby
- William de Stowe
- Walter de Alderbury
- William Chamber ?-1412.
- Gilbert Stone 1412-1417.
- William Barrow 1417.
- Walter Medford 1417-1419. Prebend of Caddington Minor 1419
- William Barton 1419-1420.
- John Standolf 1420-1422.
- Robert Rolleston 1422-?
- John Saxton 1427-1447.
- Thomas Boleyn 1447-1451.
- Thomas Hall 1451-1479.
- John de Gigliis 1479-1482.
- John Smith 1482-1484. Prebend of Ealdstreet 1484.
- John Aleyne or Carver 1484 Prebend of Nesden 1484.
- John Newcourt 1484-1485.
- Richard FitzJames 1485-1497. Bishop of Rochester 1497.
- Richard Fenrother 1497-1501.
- Peter Greves 1501-?
- John Dowman ?-1514. Prebend of Twiford 1514
- John Palgrave 1514-1554.
- Edmund Brigott 1554-1565.
- Edmund Parkynson 1565-?
- Thomas Turswell 1580-1583.
- Richard Wood 1585-1609.
- Gabriel Powell 1609-1611.
- Thomas Sanderson 1611-1614.
- Gregory Dunkett 1614-1624.
- Thomas Worrall 1624-1627. Prebend of Holbourn 1627.
- John Harris 1628, 1633.
- Christopher Shute 1660-1663.
- Charles Mason 1663-1677/8.
- William Batty 1678-1706.
- Francis Hare 1707-1740.
- Joseph Butler Bishop of Bristol. 1740-1750.
- Thomas Secker Bishop of Oxford. 1750-1758.
- Thomas Newton Bishop of Bristol. 1761-1782.
- Thomas Thurlow Bishop of Lincoln. 1782-1787.
- George Pretyman Tomline Bishop-designate of Lincoln. 1787-1820. Bishop of Winchester 1820
- William van Mildert Bishop of Llandaff. 1820-1826. Bishop of Durham 1826
- Charles Richard Sumner Bishop-designate of Llandaff. 1826-1827. Bishop of Winchester 1827
- Charles Wodsworth 1828-1844.
- Alexander McCaul 1844-1863.
- Helen Shannon 2023-Present.

== Prebendaries of Reculverland ==
- Aldred
- Robert Pictor
- Berbund de Waltham
- William [de Belmeis I (of Beaumais)]
- Thomas Becket Archbishop of Canterbury
- Hugh de Reculver
- Henry de Civitate
- Giles de Erdington
- Ralph of Framingham
- Ralph de Stanford
- Ralph de Stanford c. 1291.
- Robert de Clothale D.Th.
- John de Elham ?-1331.
- Simon Flambard 1331-?
- William de Wykyngeston ?-1337.
- Robert de Chikewell 1337-1359.
- William de Coloinge 1371, 1389.
- John Wyke 1398-1419. Prebend of Wilsden 1419.
- John Ixworth senior 1419. Prebend of Pancratius 22 June.
- Richard Betty 1419-1440.
- Nicholas Sturgeon 1440-1452. Prebend of Cantlers 1452.
- Richard Bole 1452-1456.
- Thomas Arderne 1456-1471.
- Thomas Jane 1471-1480. Prebend of Rugmere 1480.
- William Lambert 1480-1493.
- John Hill 1493. Prebend of Finsbury 1493.
- Edward Vaughan 1493-1499. Prebend of Harleston 1499.
- Robert Frost 1499-?
- Charles Booth ?-1516. Bishop of Hereford 1516
- Roger Norton 1516-1527.
- John Alen 1527-1528. Archbishop of Dublin 1528
- John Bell 1528-1539. Bishop of Worcester 1539
- Edward Sepham 1539-1554.
- Henry Pendilton 1554-1557.
- Robert Willanton 1558. Prebend of Pancratius 1558.
- Edmund Bonner or Wymmesley 1559, 1577.
- Michael Reniger 1583-1609.
- Leonard Hutton 1609-?
- John Tolson 1632-1639. Prebend of Cantlers 1639.
- Benjamin Stone 1639-?.
- Richard Owen 1660-?
- Benjamin Stone (again) ?-1665.
- William Bell 1666-1683.
- Ambrose Atfield 1683-1684.
- Edward Carter 1684-1688.
- Robert Brabant 1688-1722.
- Henry Bridges 1722-1728.
- Thomas Spateman 1728-1761.
- Denison Cumberland 1761-1763.
- John Hotham 1763-1771. Prebend of Rugmere 1771.
- Stotherd Abdy 1771.
- Richard Beadon 1771-1775. Prebend of Mapesbury 1775.
- George Watson Hand 1775-1802.
- Francis John Hyde Wollaston 1802-1814.
- William Stanley Goddard 1814-1845.
- Anthony Grant 1845-1846.
- Robert George Baker 1846-1878.
- David Gordon Wilson 2002-2005.

== Prebendaries of Rugmere ==
- Ralph son of Algod
- William son of Ralph
- Ralph de Chiltone
- John Witing
- Cinthius the Roman
- William de Rising Archdeacon of London 1234
- Nicholas de Bladintone
- Walter Niger alias of London
- Richard de Wendover alias Physicus
- Walter de Saleron alias of London Dean of St Pauls 1245 - 1257
- Rostand
- John of Crakehall
- Jordan Piruntus
- Osbert the Roman
- Obert the Roman c. 1291, 1303.
- Reginald de Sancto Albano ?-1303.
- William de Chaddleshunt
- Thomas de Wilton 1324.
- Balsamus Talami of Florence ?-1330.
- Gilbert de Bruera 1330-1354.
- John de Welwyk 1354-1356.
- William de Fieschi 1356-?
- William Dighton 1361-1364.
- William de Beverley 1364-1367.
- John Brettevill 1367-?
- John de Schingham
- John de Wylyot 1371.
- Robert Bradegare ?-1409.
- Robert Manfeld Provost of Beverley. 1409-1410. Prebend of Brownswood 1410.
- Richard Bruton 1410-1416. Prebend of Islington 1416.
- Henry Ware 1416-1418. Bishop of Chichester 1418.
- Thomas Damett 1418-1436.
- Thomas Lisieux 1436-1452. Prebend of Totenhall 1452.
- John Sutton 1452-1480.
- Thomas Jane 1480-1487. Prebend of Brownswood 1487.
- Oliver King 1487-1492. Bishop of Exeter 1492.
- John Morgan 1493-1496. Bishop of St Davids 1496
- Peter le Penec 1496-1500.
- Thomas Randolff 1500-1521.
- Thomas Bennet 1521-1558.
- Tristram Swaddell ?-1560.
- Thomas Cole 1560-1571.
- Robert Avys 1571-1581.
- William Goddell 1581-1590.
- Zachary Goddell 1590-?
- Matthew Smallwood 1660-1683.
- John Williams 1683-1696. Bishop of Chichester 1696.
- John Wright 1697-1701.
- James Barker 1701-1736.
- Fifield Allen 1736-1738. Prebend of Mora 1738.
- Edmund Gibson 1738-1740. Prebend of Chiswick 1740.
- Lancelot Jackson 1741. Prebend of Wenlocksbarn 1741.
- William Gibson 1741-1742. Prebend of Cantlers 1742.
- Thomas Archer 1743-1767.
- Anthony Hamilton 1767-1771. Prebend of Mora 1771.
- John Hotham 1771-1780.
- Drake Hollingbery 1780-1821.
- John Sleath 1822-1847.
- William Aldwin Soames 1847-1866.

== Prebendaries of Sneating ==
- Living son of Leured
- Elias son of Ranulph Flambard
- William son of Otho
- Ralph son of Ranulph Flambard
- William Medicus
- Richard son of Nicholas
- Edmund de Suwella
- Robert de Watford
- Benedict
- Robert Passelewe Prebend of Nesden 1242, and Caddington Minor 1243.
- Robert Le Moyne
- Reginald de Brandon
- John de Ditton
- Alan de Hotham 1331.
- Henry de Campeden ?-1352.
- William de Askeby or Scoter 1352-?
- Thomas de Brembre 1354-1361.
- William de Tiryngton 1361-1394.
- Richard Courtenay 1394-1413. Bishop of Norwich 1413.
- Nicholas Colnet 1413-1420.
- Nicholas Bildeston 1420-1441.
- Richard Wetwang 1441-1453.
- John Sendall 1453-1454.
- William Radclyffe 1454-1458.
- James Goldwell 1458-1459. Prebend of Islington 1459.
- John Weston 1459-?
- William Poteman ?-1466.
- Richard Bigod 1466-?
- Robert Pevesay ?-1495.
- Robert Blythe 1495-?
- Geoffrey Blythe ?-1503. Bishop of Coventry and Lichfield 1503
- Edward Underwood 1503-1518.
- Thomas Brerewood 1518-1524.
- William Stillington 1524-1528.
- Walter Preston 1528-1533.
- Simon Matthew or Cour 1533-1541.
- Henry Cole 1541-1542. Prebend of Wenlocksbarn 1542.
- John Wymmesley 1542-1556.
- Robert Stoopes 1556-1559.
- David Padye 1559-1577.
- William Cotton 1577-1598. Bishop of Exeter 1598.
- John King 1599-1611. Bishop of London 1611.
- William Ballowe 1611-1618.
- John Montford 1618-1651/2.
- John Wilton 1660-1665.
- Thomas Grigg 1666-1669. Prebend of Wilsden 1669.
- Francis Turner 1669-1683. Bishop of Rochester 1683.
- Henry Godolphin 1683-1733.
- Thomas Machin Fiddes 1733-1734.
- Fifield Allen 1734-1736. Prebend of Rugmere 1736.
- Leonard Twells 1736-1742.
- Benjamin Bulkeley 1742-1757.
- John Pettingall 1757-1781.
- George Jubb 1781-1787.
- Thomas Carwardine 1788-1824.
- John Davison 1824-1831.
- Thomas Hartwell Horne 1831-1862.

== Prebendaries of Totenhall ==
- Wulman
- Ranulph Flambard Bishop of Durham, June 1099-Sept. 1128.
- Humphrey Bigod
- William de Mareni
- Ralph of Langford Dean of St Paul’s c1154
- Hugh de Mareni Archdeacon of London c1154 Dean of St Paul’s 1157
- Ralph de Diceto Dean of St Paul’s 1180
- Alard de Burnham
- William son of Robert
- Geoffrey de Lucy
- John Maunsel
- Richard Gravesend Bishop of London 1280
- Antony Bek Bishop of Durham 1283
- James de Hispania ?-1330.
- Odard de Monte Martini 1304.
- John de Ufford 1330-1348. Archbishop of Canterbury 1348.
- John de Carleton 1348-1361.
- John de Brinkele 1361. Prebend of Oxgate 1361
- William of Wykeham 1361-1362.
- John de Blewbury 1362-1363.
- William of Wykeham (again) 1363-1366.
- John de Flamsted ?-1364.
- John Thebaud of Sudbury 1364-?
- William Dighton ?-1391.
- John Carp 1391-1400.
- Reginald Kentwood 1400-1441.
- Thomas Wodeford or Belton 1441-1452.
- Thomas Lisieux 1452-1456.
- Lawrence Booth 1456-1457. Bishop of Durham 1457. Archbishop of York 1476.
- Thomas Graunt 1457-1473. Prebend of Mora 1473
- Thomas Winterborne 1473-1478.
- Walter Knightley 1479-1501.
- Gonsalvo Ferdinand 1501-1513.
- William Horsey 1513-1543.
- Richard Gwent 1543.
- Thomas Darbyshire 1543-1559.
- Thomas Watts 1560-1577.
- Adam Squire 1577-1588.
- Alexander Nowell 1588-1602.
- Simon Rogers 1602.
- John Overall 1602-1614. Bishop of Coventry and Lichfield 1614.
- William Shaw 1614-?
- Samuel Baker 1636-?
- Richard Marsh 1660-1687.
- Zacchaeus Isham 1688-1705.
- John Pelling 1705-1750.
- Hugh Wynne 1750-1754.
- Richard Browne 1754-1780.
- Michael Lort 1780-1790.
- Thomas Willis 1790-1827.
- Cholmeley Edward John Dering 1827-1848.
- Richard Burgess 1850-1881.
- Austin H. Thompson -1941.
- H T Carnegie 1941-

== Prebendaries of Twiford ==
- Durand
- Robert of Caen
- Richard Ruffus II
- Thomas of Hurstbourne
- William of Potterne
- Maurice of Harlow
- William de Lodnes
- Robert de Insula Archdeacon of Colchester
- William Passemer Archdeacon of London 1272
- Robert de Drayton
- Bartholomew of Ferentino
- Robert de Drayton ?-1301.
- Bartholomew de Ferentino
- Laurence Fastolf 1354.
- Pascasius de Boloigne 1361.
- Thomas de Keynes 1361-1366.
- Alexander de Southo 1366-1370.
- Bartholomew Sidey 1370. Prebend of Nesden in Nov.
- John de Berking ?-1390.
- William de Waltham 1390-1391.
- William Sondey 1390-?
- Christopher Marini Card. priest of S. Cyriacus. 1391.
- Thomas Weston 1393-1397.
- John Danby 1397-1400.
- John Hildyard 1400-1409.
- Robert Wytton c. 1400-1403.
- Richard Clifford junior 1409-1414.
- John Wakering 1414-1415. Bishop of Norwich 1415.
- Thomas Walbere 1416-1446.
- Elias de Holcote 1446-1449.
- Richard Chester 1449-?
- John Wardall ?-1472.
- William Woodcock Lic.M. 1472-1488.
- John Bailly Inc.Cn.L. 1488-1495.
- Richard Draper 1495-1498.
- William FitzHerbert 1498-1514.
- John Dowman 1514-1526.
- William Cliffe 1526-1548. Prebend of Hoxton 1548.
- William Chedsey 1548-1554. Prebend of Chiswick 1554.
- Arthur Cole 1554-1558.
- Richard Smith ?-1563.
- Robert Greenacres 1563-1573.
- William Barkesdale 1573-1600.
- Hugh Johnson 1600-1614.
- Robert Kerchier 1614-1645.
- Thomas Cartwright 1665-1686. Bishop of Chester 1686.
- Lucas Beaulieu 1687-1723.
- Samuel Baker 1723-1727. Prebend of Brownswood 1727.
- Robert Kilburne ?-1730.
- Francis Stanley 1731-1775.
- John Mangey 1775-1782.
- Henry Waring 1782-1795.
- Henry Meen 1795-1817.
- James William Bellamy 1817-1819.
- Samuel Birch 1819-1848.
- Edward Murray 1848-1852.
- William Gilson Humphry 1852-1886.
- ?
- Herbert Priestley Cronshaw
- ?
- Neil Richardson ?-2013
- Mark Melluish 2013

== Prebendaries of Weldland ==
- Karolus of Chichester
- Wulfred son of Goldman
- Geoffrey son of Wulfred
- Walter de Dunstanvill or d'Unfranville
- Walter de Insula
- Nicholas
- Simon of Gloucester
- John Belemains
- Henry de Cornhill
- Roger Weseham Bishop of Coventry and Lichfield 1245
- Stephen de Sandwic Archdeacon of Essex
- William Lupus Archdeacon of Lincoln
- Philip Lovel
- Henry of Sandwich Bishop of London 1263
- Nicholas of Ely Bishop of Worcester 1266
- Bartholomew de Regio
- John de Luco Prebend of Islington 1295
- Thomas de Northflete Prebend of Chamberlainwood 1299
- John de Sancto Claro
- John de Sancto Claro
- William de Chaddleshunt
- Reginald de Sancto Albano
- Walter Reynolds ?-1307/8? Bishop of Worcester 1308
- Gilbert de Middleton ?-1318. Prebend of Wenlocksbarn 1318.
- John Walwayne 1318-1326.
- Thomas de Burgh 1326-1330.
- Robert de Reddeswell 1330-?
- John de Gaddesden
- Simon de Stratford ?-1349.
- Thomas de Romeseye 1349-?
- John de Lech ?-1361.
- Richard de Chesterfield 1361-1365. Prebend of Oxton and Cropwell Prima in Southwell Collegiate Church 1365
- Richard Northwell 1365-?
- Robert Wavendon ?-1394. Prebend of Halley in collegiate church of Westbury-on-Trym, Glos. 1394
- Robert Whitteby 1394-?
- John Ryder 1417-1418. Prebend of Pancratius 1418.
- William Kynwollmerssh 1418-1422.
- William Alnwick 1422-1426. Bishop of Norwich 1426.
- John Snell 1426-1431.
- John Stokes 1431-1440.
- Adam Moleyns 1440-1443.
- Nicholas Upton 1443-1446.
- Robert Aiscough 1446-1447. Sacrists' prebend in Southwell Collegiate Church
- Richard Hayman 1447-1453.
- Lawrence Booth 1453. Prebend of Mapesbury 1453. Archbishop of York 1476.
- Richard Hayman (again) 1453-1457. Prebend of Wenlocksbarn 1457.
- James Goldwell 1457-1458. Prebend of Sneating 1458.
- John Wodde 1458-1461.
- William Freston 1461-?
- Thomas Chaundeler 1476-1489.
- Robert Sherborne B.M. 1489-1493. Prebend of Finsbury 1493
- John Hill 1493-1495. Prebend of Mapesbury 1495.
- Richard Rayader 1496-1506.
- John Underhill 1506-1519.
- John Incent 1519-1545.
- Gilbert Bourne 1545-1548. Prebend of Brownswood 1548.
- Robert Willanton 1548-1558. Prebend of Reculversland 1558.
- John Morren 1558-1560.
- Alexander Nowell 1560-1588. Prebend of Totenhall 1588.
- William Hutchinson 1589-1590.
- Arthur Bright 1590-1618.
- William Piers 1618-1630. Bishop of Peterborough 1630.
- Robert Thompson 1630-?
- Thomas Lant ?-1688.
- John Pulleyne 1689-1713.
- Thomas Sherlock 1713-1731. Bishop of Bangor 1728
- George Lavington 1731-1748. Bishop of Exeter 1747
- John Hume 1748-1766. Bishop of Oxford 1758. Bishop of Salisbury 1766.
- Hon. Frederick Cornwallis Bishop of Coventry and Lichfield. 1766-1768.
- John Egerton Bishop of Bangor. 1768-1771. Bishop of Coventry and Lichfield 1768 – 1771. Bishop of Durham 1771
- John Green Bishop of Lincoln. 1771-1779.
- John Jeffreys 1779-1798.
- Samuel Ryder Weston 1798-1822.
- Frederick William Blomberg 1822-1847.
- Thomas Jackson 1850-1886.

== Prebendaries of Wenlocksbarn ==
- Adwin
- William of Winchester
- Richard of Winchester
- Alberic
- Walter of Hartpury
- Richard Foliot I
- Robert Folet
- Ralph Neville Bishop of Chichester 1224
- Luke
- Geoffrey de Fering Dean of St Paul’s 1262
- Adam Bek
- John de Sancta Maria
- Hugh of Collingham
- Stephen Gravesend Bishop of London 1318
- Gilbert de Middleton 1318-1331.
- Richard de Bury 1331-1333. Bishop of Durham 1333
- Robert de Taunton 1335.
- William de Cusantia 1335-1360.
- John de Branketre 1360-1375.
- Pontius de Vereriis 1360.
- John de Hanney 1375-?
- Thomas de Horton ?-1394.
- Nicholas Slake 1394-1395.
- William de Styvecle 1395-?
- Thomas Bubwith ?-1429.
- John Horton 1429-1441.
- Richard Wetwang 1440-1441.
- John Cariter 1441-1443.
- Gerard Hesil 1443-1452.
- Thomas Graunt 1452-1457. Prebend of Totenhall 1457.
- Richard Hayman 1457-1462.
- John Chedworth 1462-1464. Prebend of Newington 1464
- William Say 1464-1468.
- Richard Lichfield 1468-1472. Prebend of Newington 1472.
- John Gunthorpe 1472. Archdeacon of Essex 1472
- William Pykenham 1472-?
- Humphrey de la Pole ?-1509.
- Edward Sharnbroke 1509-1530.
- Richard Foxford 1530-1533.
- Peter Ligham 1533-1538.
- Gilbert Wykes 1538-1542.
- Henry Cole 1542-1559.
- William May 1559-1560.
- John Pulleyne 1561-1565.
- John Bullingham 1565-1571.
- Robert Towers 1571-1585.
- Henry Hamond 1585-1592.
- John Leese 1592-1605.
- Griffin Vaughan 1605-1613.
- Samuel Fell 1613-1649.
- Brian Walton 1660. Bishop of Chester 1660
- George Stradling 1660-1688.
- Francis Hawkins 1688-1699.
- Roger Altham 1699-1730.
- Matthew Gibson 1730-1741.
- Lancelot Jackson 1741-1750.
- John Wickins 1750-1783.
- Samuel Parr 1783-1825.
- Herbert Oakeley 1825-1845.
- Thomas Grainger Hall 1845-1881.
- H.W. Tucker 1881
- Rev. F. Hall ?-1902
- Rt. Rev. Henry Montgomery 1902–?
- ?
- Philippa Boardman 2002-2013
- Stephen Coles 2013-2021
- Philip Chester 2021

== Prebendaries of Wilsden ==
- Huctred
- Hugh son of Generannus
- Henry Banastre
- Henry
- William de Sancte Marie Ecclesia II Archdeacon of Middlesex by 1217
- Nicholas de Gamborile
- John de Norton Archdeacon of Middlesex by 1242
- Robert de Barton Dean of St Paul’s 1257
- William Passemer Archdeacon of London 1272
- Ralph de Bohun
- Ralph de Bohun c. 1291.
- William Passemere
- Henry de Chaddesden ?-1354.
- Thomas de Braose 1354-?
- John de Thorp 1361, 1366.
- Adam de Hertington 1375-?
- Thomas Baketon ?-1397.
- Roger Walden 1397. Archbishop of Canterbury 1397
- Thomas Wisbech 1397-1409.
- John Chitterne 1409-1419.
- John Wyke 1419-1428.
- Thomas Warde 1428-1452.
- John Pakenham 1452-1459.
- - Seth 1459-?
- William Worsley ?-1499.
- Richard Rawlins 1499-1523. Bishop of St Davids 1523.
- William Patenson 1523-1525.
- John Tunstal 1525-1527. Prebend of Mora 1527
- Peter Wylberfosse 1527-1533.
- Peter Ligham 1533. Prebend of Wenlocksbarn in 1533
- William Saxey 1533-1567.
- William Gravett 1567-1599.
- John Dixe 1599-1614.
- Thomas King 1614-1616.
- Henry Mason 1616-1637.
- Samuel Hoard 1637-1659.
- Robert Pory 1660-1669.
- Thomas Grigg 1669-1670.
- Thomas Cook 1670-1679.
- Robert Grove 1679-1691. Bishop of Chichester 1691.
- Stephen Bordley 1691-1695.
- Roger Altham 1695-1699. Prebend of Wenlocksbarn 1699.
- William Whitfield 1699-1707. Prebend of Finsbury 1707.
- Joshua Burton 1708-1730.
- Edmund Marten 1730-1751.
- Sackville Turner 1751-1752.
- Richard Browne 1752-1754. Prebend of Totenhall 1754.
- George Secker 1754-1768.
- Charles Sturges 1768-1805.
- Robert Wintle 1805-1848.
- George Robert Gleig 1848-1888.
