= Ernest Hawkins =

Ernest Hawkins may refer to:

- Ernest Hawkins (priest) (1802–1868), English churchman, and mission administrator
- Ernest Hawkins (footballer) (1872-1941), Welsh footballer, see List of Bury F.C. players (1–24 appearances)
- Ernest Hawkins (coach) (1927–2018), head coach at East Texas State University
- Ernie Hawkins (born 1947), American blues artist
