= Henry de Cornhill =

Henry de Cornhill may refer to:

- Henry de Cornhill (sheriff) (fl. late 12th century), medieval English royal official
- Henry de Cornhill (priest) (fl. early 13th century), medieval English Dean of St Paul's
