= William Benet (diplomat) =

English ambassador

William Benet (died 26 September 1533) was an English ambassador.

== Life ==
William Benet was a younger brother of Dr Thomas Benet (died 1558), a canon of Salisbury and of St Paul's London. His uncle was John Benet, a merchant taylor of the city of London. By 1521, when he entered Doctors' Commons, he was a doctor of civil law. He may have been educated at Oxford, and be the William Bennet who took the degree of B.A. at Oxford on 31 Jan. 1512-3. (He should not be confused, however, with the William Bennet who was admitted B.C.L. on 18 Feb. 1527-8.)

Benet was canon of Leighlin as early as 1522. At this time he was practising in Cardinal Wolsey's legatine court, and during the next few years he occasionally acted as the legate's commissary, and was also employed in visiting cathedral chapters and monasteries to procure the election of candidates favoured by his master. Having in these missions shown an aptitude for diplomacy, Henry VIII ordered him, in November 1528, to proceed as ambassador to Rome, in conjunction with Dr. William Knight, Sir Francis Bryan, Sir Gregory di Casale, and Peter Vannes. The new embassy was to urge the pope (Clement VII), in the first instance, to declare that the brief of his predecessor Julius II, in favour of the king's marriage with Catharine of Aragon, was a forgery, then to revoke the cause to Rome, and finally to promise a sentence in the king's favour. A report of the pope's death, and other occurrences, caused these arrangements to be altered, and Stephen Gardiner, who had been recalled from Rome and met the new ambassadors at Lyons, returned to his post, and Knight and Benet came back to England. In the following year (Gardiner was actually recalled, and Benet was sent to supply his place as resident ambassador at Rome (20 May 1529). His instructions now were to dissuade the pope from revoking the cause, as it was uncertain what his decision might be. He was also commissioned to treat for a peace between Francis I and Charles V, and for liberation of the French king's sons, who were detained as hostages for their father in Spain. He arrived in Rome on 16 June, and in the autumn he was sent to meet the emperor Charles V at Bologna, being commissioned, in conjunction with the Earl of Wiltshire and others, to persuade the emperor to consent to the king's divorce from Catharine, and to treat for a general peace between the potentates of Europe.

He returned to Rome in May 1530, and was busily engaged for the next year and a half in promoting the king's cause there. In November 1531 he was recalled, but was sent back to Home after a brief visit to England, arriving there on 3 Feb. 1532, with instructions to hinder the pope from giving sentence till the emperor was back in Spain. He was present at the interview between the pope and the emperor at Bologna at the end of 1532, returning to home about April 1533. Meanwhile, the act prohibiting appeals to Rome had been pushed through parliament, and in May of the same year Thomas Cranmer's sentence dissolving the king's marriage had been pronounced at Dunstable Priory. The pope answered that critical step by a sentence of excommunication, delivered on 11 July. Benet's further stay at Rome was useless, and he was recalled. He travelled homewards in company with Edmund Bonner, afterwards bishop of London, and Sir Edward Carne, but never reached England, dying at Susa in Piedmont on 26 September 1533. His companions had some difficulty in rescuing his plate and other property, which were claimed by Charles III, Duke of Savoy. His will was proved on 11 May 1534.

The ecclesiastical benefices and dignities held by him were as follows : canon of Salisbury, 6 April 1526; prebendary of Ealdland, London, 26 Nov. 1526; advowson of the next prebend in St. Stephen's, 28 Feb. 1528; next presentation of Highhungar, London diocese, 12 Dec. 1528; archdeacon of Dorset, 20 Dec. 1530; advowson of Bamack church, Northamptonshire, which he intended to bestow on his brother, 21 April 1533; a prebend in Southwell; and the churches of Marnehull, Dorsetshire; Aston, Hertfordshire; and Sutton, Surrey. In addition to the above there is some ground for believing that he was granted a reversion to the deanery of Salisbury. His name does not appear in the lists of the deans of that cathedral, but there is a letter from him to Henry VIII, thanking the king for 'remembering him with the deanery of Sarum.' Many letters written during his residence abroad are preserved in the Public Record Office and the British Museum.
