= John Williams (bishop of Chichester) =

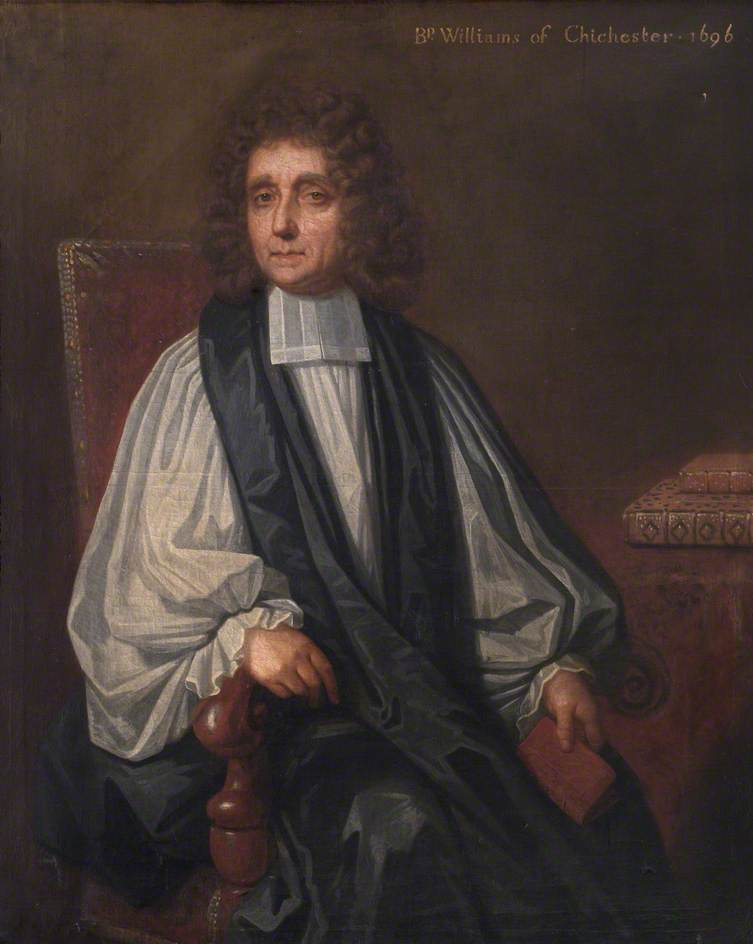
Bishop Williams

John Williams (c.1636 – 24 April 1709) was an English Bishop of Chichester.

== Life ==
He was born about 1636 in Northamptonshire, matriculated from Magdalen Hall, Oxford, on 24 June 1653, graduating B.A. on 14 December 1655 and M.A. on 11 June 1658. He was incorporated at Cambridge in 1660, and was created D.D. of Cambridge, comitiis regiis, in 1690.

On 4 September 1673 he was instituted to the rectory of St. Mildred Poultry, and on 21 September 1683 was collated to the prebend of Rugmere in St. Paul's. After the Glorious Revolution he became chaplain to William III and Mary II, and was preferred to a prebend of Canterbury. In 1695 and in 1696 he was Boyle Lecturer, publishing his sermons separately as they were delivered. A collective edition appeared in 1708.

On 13 December 1696 he was consecrated bishop of Chichester. He died in London in Gray's Inn on 24 April 1709, and was buried on 28 April in the church of St. Mildred Poultry.

== Works ==
Williams was known as a controversialist, writing against Roman Catholics and dissenters. Among his works were:

- 'The History of the Gunpowder Treason,' London, 1678; new edits. 1679 and 1681.
- 'A Catechism truly representing the Doctrines and Practices of the Church of Rome,' London, 1686; 3rd edit. 1713.
- 'The Difference between the Church of England and the Church of Rome,' 1687, (reprinted in 1738 and in 1836 in vol. iii. of the 'Enchiridion Theologicum' of Edward Cardwell.
- 'A brief Exposition of the Church Catechism,' London, 1689; new edit. 1841; Welsh translation, 1699.
- 'A True Representation of the Principles of the Sect known by the name of Muggletonians,' London, 1694.
- , A Discourse Concerning the Celebration of Divine Service in an Unknown Tongue, London, 1685.

Church of England titles
Preceded by Robert Grove	Bishop of Chichester; 1696–1709	Succeeded by Thomas Manningham
