= Robert Grove (bishop) =

British bishop

The Right Reverend Robert Grove
- Bishop of Chichester
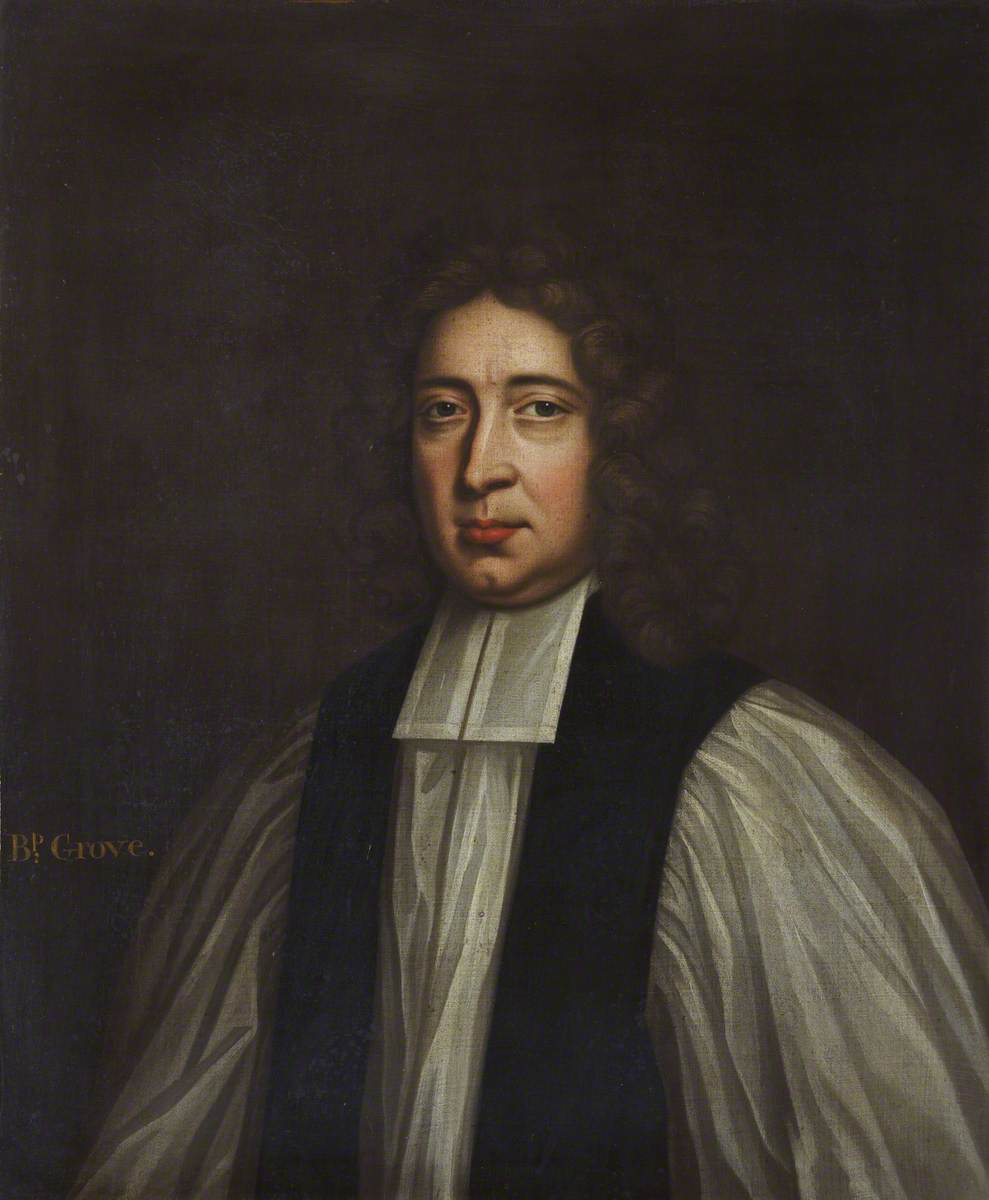
- Church: Church of England
- Diocese: Chichester
- Elected: 1691
- Term ended: 1696 (died)
- Predecessor: Simon Patrick
- Successor: John Williams

Personal details
- Born: 1634 London
- Died: 25 September 1696 (aged 61–62)
- Buried: Chichester Cathedral
- Denomination: Anglican
- Spouse: Elizabeth Cole
- Education: Winchester College; St John's College, Cambridge

Robert Grove (1634–1696) was an English Bishop of Chichester.

== Life ==
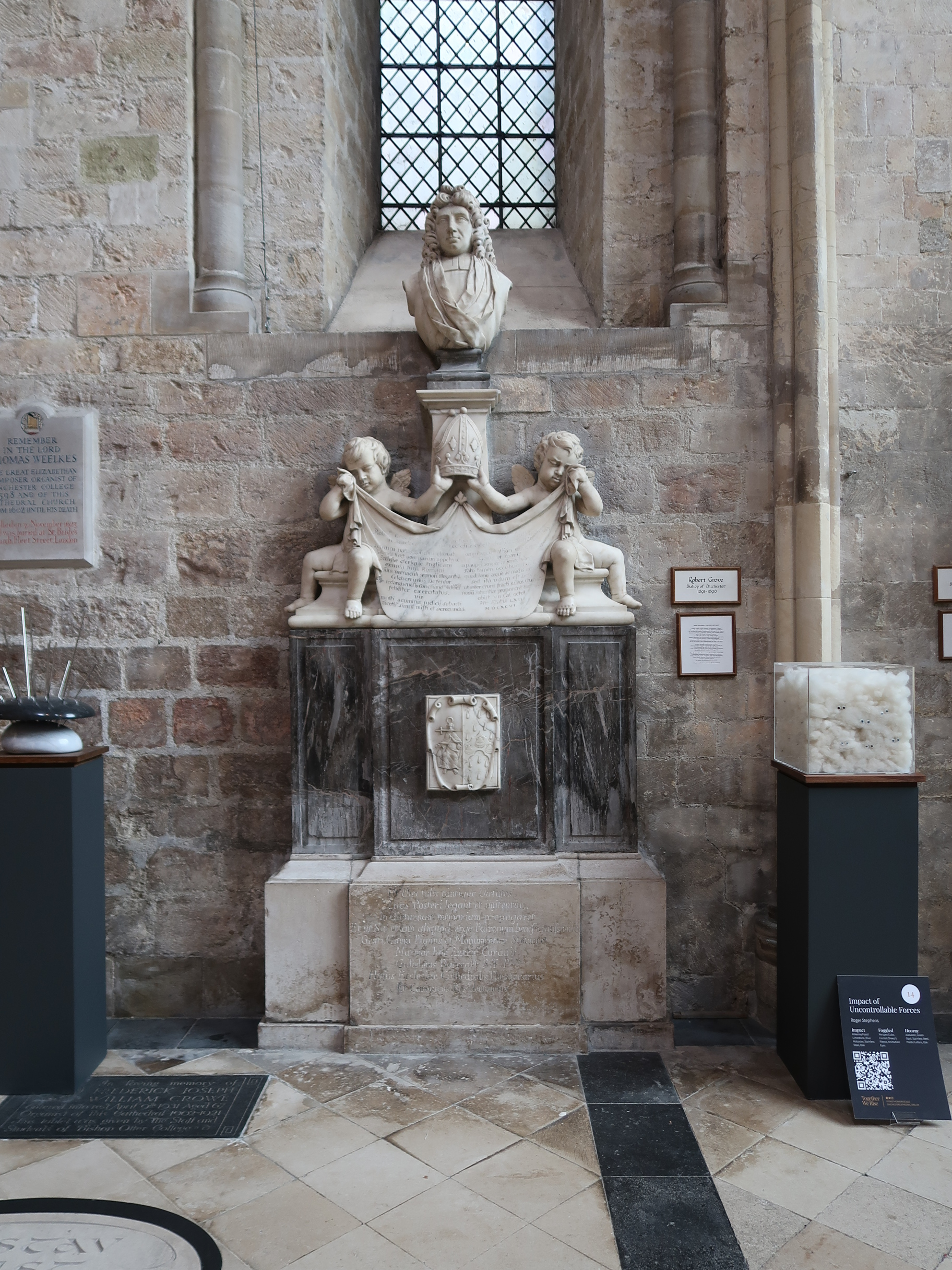
Memorial in Chichester Cathedral

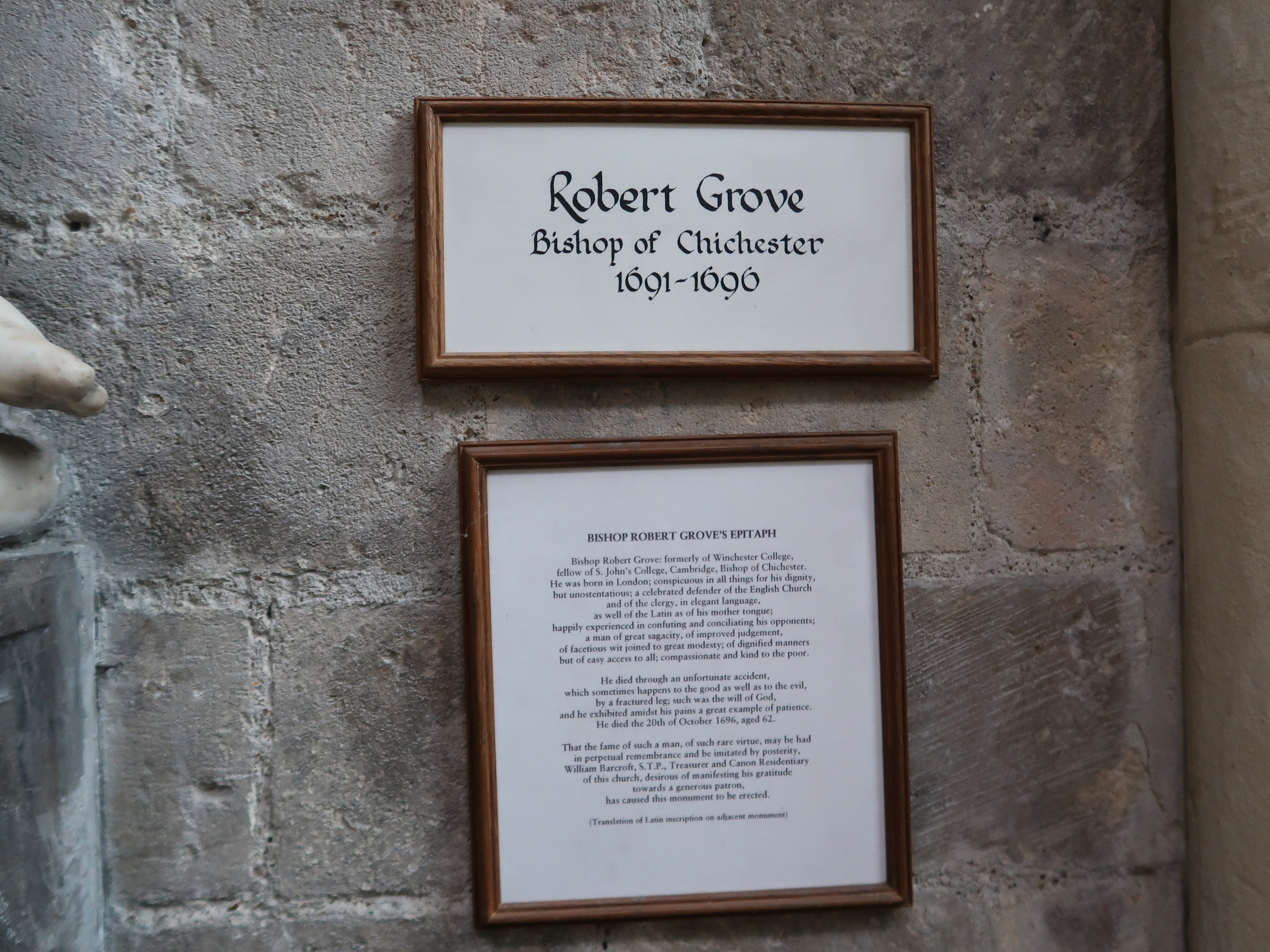
Bishop Robert Grove's Epitaph

Born in London in 1634 or 1635, he was the son of William Grove of Morden, Dorset. In 1645 he was sent to Winchester College, and was admitted a pensioner of St. John's College, Cambridge, on 18 October 1652. He was elected a scholar in 1653, graduated B.A. in 1657, and became a fellow on 23 March 1658. For several years he lived in college as tutor, proceeding M.A. in 1660, B.D. in 1667, and D.D. in 1681.

Grove, on becoming chaplain to Humphrey Henchman, Bishop of London, was presented by him to the rectory of Wennington, Essex, on 21 February 1667, which he left before 27 January 1669. On 2 September 1669 he received from the crown the rectory of Langham, Essex and on 5 October following the rectory of Aldham, in the same county, from the bishop. These livings he resigned on obtaining from Henchman the wealthy rectory of St. Andrew Undershaft, London, on 18 February 1670. On 6 October 1679 he was made prebendary of Willesden in St. Paul's Cathedral.

He took part in drawing up the famous petition against James II's declaration for liberty of conscience in May 1688. On 8 September 1690 he was appointed archdeacon of Middlesex, being also chaplain in ordinary to the king and queen. He was consecrated bishop of Chichester on 30 August 1691. He died from the effects of a carriage accident on 25 September 1696, aged 62. He was buried in Chichester Cathedral. He married Elizabeth Cole of Dover.

== Works ==
Grove had verses in Academiae Cantabrigiensis σώστρα, 1660, and his Carmen de Sanguinis Circuitu a Gulielmo Harvaeo primum invento was published with some miscellaneous poems in 1685. From 1676 to 1689 he maintained a sharp controversy with William Jenkyn and other nonconformists.

His other writings, excluding sermons published separately, are:

- A Vindication of the Conforming Clergy from the Unjust Aspersions of Heresie, &c., in answer to some part of M. Jenkyn's Funeral Sermon upon Dr. Seaman. With Short Reflexions on some Passages in a Sermon preached by Mr. J. S. upon 2 Cor. v. 20. In a Letter to a Friend (anon.), London, 1676 (2nd edit. 1680).
- Responsio ad nuperum libellum qui inscribitur Celeusma, reply to Jenkyn, London, 1680.
- A Short Defence of the Church and Clergy of England, wherein some of the common objections against both are answered, and the means of union briefly considered (anon.), London, 1681.
- Defensio suae Responsionis ad nuperum libellum, again on Jenkyn's Celeusma, London, 1682.
- A Perswasive to Communion with the Church of England (anon.), London, 1683 (2nd edit, same year).
- An Answer to Mr. Lowth's Letter to Dr. Stillingfleet, London, 1687, reply to Simon Lowth.
- The Fifteenth Note of the Church Examined, viz. Temporal Felicity (anon.), pages 365–399 of the confutation of Cardinal Bellarmine's Notes of the Church, published anonymously by W. Sherlock, London, 1688.
- The Protestant and Popish Way of interpreting Scripture, impartially compared in answer to Pax Vobis, reply to E. G., "preacher of the Word", (anon.), London, 1689.

Grove also translated into Latin Bishop Thomas Barlow's Popery, London, 1682.

Church of England titles
Preceded by Simon Patrick	Bishop of Chichester; 1691–1696	Succeeded by John Williams
