= John Fuller (college head) =

John Fuller (died 1558) was the master of Jesus College, Cambridge. As bishop's chancellor in Ely, Cambridgeshire, he was charged with suppressing Christian heresy, condemning several heretics to be burnt at the stake.

== Biography ==
Fuller was a native of Gloucester. He was educated at All Souls College, Oxford, where he was admitted to the Bachelor of Canon Law degree in July 1533, and became a fellow in 1536. He graduated Doctor of Canon Law in January 1546, and in the same year admitted himself a member of Doctors' Commons. In 1547 he served as rector of Hanwell, Middlesex, but resigned the charge in 1551, having in 1550 been appointed vicar-general or chancellor to Thomas Thirlby, bishop of Norwich. At about the same time he became vicar of Swaffham, and rector of East Dereham and North Creake in Norfolk.

=== Marian Persecutions ===
Upon Thirlby's translation to the diocese of Ely, Fuller went with him as chancellor. On 24 September 1554 Fuller was installed Thirlby's proxy in Ely Cathedral. The following November he was collated prebendary of the fifth stall. As chancellor he was also examiner of heretics, and condemned several. His judgement seldom inclined to leniency, although some of his fellow examiners condemned more than he did. For example, during the period that became known as the Marian Persecutions, two men from Wisbech, constable William Wolsey and painter Robert Pygot, were condemned by Fuller at Ely on 9 October 1555. On 16 October they were burnt at the stake, "probably on the Palace Green in front of Ely Cathedral".

He was proctor for the clergy of the diocese in two convocations, and held other preferments, being rector of Wilbraham, Fen Ditton, and Hildersham, Cambridgeshire. He resided in Queens' College, Cambridge; when in London, he had rooms in Paternoster Row. He was appointed master of Jesus College, Cambridge on 23 February 1557 succeeding Pierpoint. The following May, he was elected to the prebend of Chamberlainwood in St Paul's, London.

=== Bequests ===
He died on 30 July 1558 and was succeeded as master by Thomas Redman.

Fuller was buried, according to his directions, in the choir of Jesus College, to which institution he bequeathed one-third of his property, besides founding four fellowships. One-third he left to the poor of certain parishes, and the remainder to his cousins William and Margaret. His specific legacies included £13 6s. 8d. to All Souls' College, Oxford, and two of his best geldings to the Bishop of Ely.
