= Henry de Cornhill (priest) =

13th-century English priest

Henry de Cornhill was a medieval English priest.

Cornhill was appointed chancellor of the Diocese of London in 1217 by the papal legate Guala Bicchieri. He also held the prebends of Finsbury and Weldland in the same diocese. He remained in the chancellorship until June 1242. By 21 May 1243 he had been appointed to the office of Dean of St Paul's Cathedral, the cathedral church of the London diocese. He remained in that office until at least 28 October 1253, his last appearance in a document. He likely continued to hold the office until his death, which occurred before 26 August 1254. His death was commemorated by the cathedral on 9 April, which implies that he died in April 1254.
