= Ernest Hawkins (priest) =

Ernest Hawkins (1802–1868) was an English Anglican churchman, a mission administrator and canon of Westminster.

== Life ==
He was the sixth son of Henry Hawkins of Lawrence End, parish of Kimpton, Hertfordshire, and major in the East India Company's service, by Anne, only child of John Gurney of Bedford, a merchant. He was born at Lawrence End on 25 January 1802, and educated at Bedford. He matriculated at Balliol College, Oxford, on 19 April 1820, and took his B.A. in 1824, M.A. in 1827, and his B.D. on 14 June 1839.

On his ordination Hawkins became curate to the Rev. Joseph Gould of Burwash, Sussex, and then travelled on the continent with a pupil. He returned to Oxford as a fellow of Exeter College on 26 December 1831, when he acted as an under-librarian of the Bodleian Library, and served the curacy of St. Aldate in the city of Oxford. Leaving Oxford about 1835 he undertook the curacy of St George's, Bloomsbury, London.

In 1838 Hawkins was appointed an under-secretary of the Society for the Propagation of the Gospel (SPG), and succeeded to the secretaryship in 1843. In the following year he became assistant preacher at Lincoln's Inn, in 1845 he became a prebendary of St Paul's Cathedral, and in 1850 minister of Curzon Chapel, Mayfair. While he was secretary of the SPG the income of the society grew, and there was an increase of the colonial episcopate from eight to 47 sees.

During 1859 Hawkins served as vice-president of the Bishop's College in Cape Town. He retired from his secretaryship in 1864, and was promoted by the crown on 7 November to a canonry at Westminster, vacated for him by William Bentinck, Archdeacon of Westminster. Among his close friends were Francis Fulford, John Medley, bishop of Fredericton; and Edward Feild. Hawkins died at 20 Dean's Yard, Westminster, on 5 October 1868, and was buried in the cloisters of the abbey on 12 Oct. He had married, 20 July 1852, Sophia Anna, daughter of John Henry George Lefroy, rector of Ashe, Hampshire.

== Works ==
Hawkins was the writer or editor of:

- Documents relative to the Erection and Endowment of Additional Bishoprics in the Colonies, 1844.
- Historical Notices of the Missions of the Church of England in the North American Colonies, 1845.
- Annals of the Diocese of Fredericton, 1847.
- Annals of the Diocese of Quebec, 1849.
- Verses for 1851 in commemoration of the Third Jubilee of the Society for the Propagation of the Gospel; ed. by E. Hawkins, 1851–2.
- Documents relating to the Erection of Bishoprics in the Colonies, 1841–1855, with an historical preface, 1855; four editions.
- Manual of Prayer for Working Men and their Families, 1855; four editions.
- Psalms, Lessons, and Prayers adapted to the use of a Household, 1855.
- The Book of Psalms, with explanatory notes, 1857; three editions.
- The Gospel according to St. John. By Five Clergymen. Ed. by E. Hawkins, 1857.
- Recent Expansion of the Church of England. The Ramsden Sermon at Oxford. With an appendix of dates and statistics, 1864.
- Sick-bed Services. With a selection of Hymns, 1867; another edition, 1873.

He also edited Nos. II and III of a work called The Church in the Colonies No. II, A Journal of Visitation to a part of the Diocese of Quebec in 1843, and No. III, A Journal of Visitation in Nova Scotia, Cape Breton, and New Brunswick in 1843.

== Notes ==
Attribution

This article incorporates text from a publication now in the public domain: Stephen, Leslie; Lee, Sidney, eds. (1891). "Hawkins, Ernest". Dictionary of National Biography. Vol. 25. London: Smith, Elder & Co.
