= Peter Vannes =

16th-century Italian Catholic churchman; Dean of Salisbury

Peter Vannes (died 1563) was an Italian Catholic churchman who became a royal official in England, and Dean of Salisbury.

== Life ==
Born at Lucca in northern Italy, he was son of Stephen de Vannes of that city. In one of his letters Erasmus calls him Peter Ammonius; and he was related to Andrea Ammonio. It was through the influence of Ammonio, who was Latin secretary to Henry VIII, that Vannes was brought to England, and he became assistant to Ammonio in 1513. Shortly he also worked for Cardinal Thomas Wolsey. Ammonio died on 17 August 1517, and Vannes immediately wrote to Wolsey asking for a living. Silvestro Gigli, another native of Lucca who was bishop of Worcester, recommended Vannes to Wolsey, and Lorenzo Campeggio in 1521 sought Vannes's influence to secure his promotion to the see of Worcester. On 12 November 1521 Vannes was presented to the living of Mottram in the diocese of Coventry and Lichfield, and in 1523 he was incorporated B.D. at Cambridge.

In 1526 an unsuccessful effort was made to secure for Vannes the bishopric of Lucca, and in October–November of that year he was in Rome. In July 1527 he accompanied Wolsey on his magnificent embassy to France, and in November 1528 was commissioned with Sir Francis Bryan ambassador to the pope. The main purpose of the mission was to induce the pope to declare Henry VIII's marriage with Catherine of Aragon void ab initio, and with this object Vannes was specially instructed to hire advocates of Henry's cause, to bribe the cardinals, and generally to secure support wherever he could. Other objects of the mission were to withdraw the pope from his alliance with the Emperor Charles V, to discover the real causes of Campeggio's failure to proceed with the divorce question, and to make inquiry into the authenticity of the brief produced by Catherine removing all the disabilities found in the original dispensation for her marriage granted by Pope Julius II. If all other means failed, Vannes was 'to inquire whether the pope will dispense with the king to have two wives, making the children of the second marriage legitimate as well as those of the first, whereof some great reasons and precedents appear, especially in the Old Testament.' Vannes reached Florence on 9 January 1529, and was at Rome on the 28th; the mission was, however, a complete failure, and in October following Vannes returned to England.

Vannes maintained friendly relations with Wolsey after his fall, which did not interfere with his advancement; on 4 December 1529 he was collated to the prebend of Bedwyn in Salisbury Cathedral, and on the 16th was instituted to the rectory of Wheathamstead, Hertfordshire. On 17 July 1533 he was appointed collector of papal taxes in England, an office soon to become a sinecure; and in the same year he was sent on the king's business to Rome, Avignon, and Marseilles.

On 12 May 1534 Vannes was made archdeacon of Worcester; on 22 February 1535 he was admitted prebendary of Bole in York Cathedral; on 22 September 1535 was constituted coadjutor to the dean of Salisbury, who was of unsound mind. He subscribed the articles of religion agreed upon in the convocation of 1536. In 1537 he held the prebend of Compton Dundon in Wells Cathedral, and on 3 February 1540 succeeded to the deanery of Salisbury. In April 1542 he was admitted to the prebend of Cadington Major in St Paul's Cathedral. He also received shortly afterwards the prebend of Shipton-Underwood in Salisbury Cathedral, the rectory of Tredington, Worcestershire; and in 1545 a pension on the loss of his canonry by dissolution at the Priory of St Frideswide, Oxford.

Vannes apparently gave up his deanery during Edward VI's reign, but retained his Latin secretaryship, the grant of which was confirmed to him on 12 December 1549. On 19 May 1550 he was sent ambassador to Venice, where he arrived in August; his salary was forty shillings a day. In September 1551 he urged the Council of Ten to restore to Sebastian Cabot the property claimed by him, and on 16 Oct. was given credentials to the senators of his native city Lucca. Sir John Mason described Vannes's conduct as timid; but he was retained in that post by Queen Mary, who also restored to him the deanery of Salisbury. Vannes was at Venice when Edward Courtenay, 1st Earl of Devon, died there, and he sent the queen an account of that event. He was recalled in September 1556.

He retained his preferments under Elizabeth and died early in 1563. By his will, dated 1 July 1562, and proved 1 May 1563, he left considerable property to his heir, Benedict Hudson alias Vannes. John Leland commemorated his friendship in an ode.

== Notes ==
Attribution

This article incorporates text from a publication now in the public domain: "Vannes, Peter". Dictionary of National Biography. London: Smith, Elder & Co. 1885–1900.
