= List of lord chancellors and lord keepers =

The following is a list of lords chancellor and lords keeper of the Great Seal of England and Great Britain. It also includes a list of commissioners of Parliament's Great Seal during the English Civil War and Interregnum.

== Lords chancellor and lords keeper of England, 1050–1707 ==
=== From the House of Wessex (1050) to the Commonwealth (1646) ===
Lord Chancellor and/or Lord Keeper	Term of office		Monarch (reign)
Regenbald	1050	after 1066	Edward the Confessor (r. 1042–1066)
Regenbald	1050	after 1066	Harold II (r. 1066)
Regenbald	1050	after 1066	William I (r. 1066–1087)
Herfast	1068	1070	William I (r. 1066–1087)
Saint Osmund, Count of Sées and Bishop of Salisbury	c. 1070	c. 1078	William I (r. 1066–1087)
Maurice, Archdeacon of Le Mans	c. 1078	c. 1085	William I (r. 1066–1087)
Gerard, Preceptor of Rouen, later Archbishop of York	c. 1085	before 1091	William I (r. 1066–1087)
Gerard, Preceptor of Rouen, later Archbishop of York	c. 1085	before 1091	William II (r. 1087–1100)
Robert Bloet	after January 1091	1094	William II (r. 1087–1100)
William Giffard	1094	April 1101	William II (r. 1087–1100)
William Giffard	1094	April 1101	Henry I (r. 1100–1135)
Roger of Salisbury	1101	1102	Henry I (r. 1100–1135)
Waldric	1102	1107	Henry I (r. 1100–1135)
Ranulf	1107	1123	Henry I (r. 1100–1135)
Geoffrey Rufus	1123	1133	Henry I (r. 1100–1135)
Robert de Sigello (Note: Keeper of the Great Seal)	1133	1135	Henry I (r. 1100–1135)
Roger le Poer	1135	1139	Stephen (r. 1135–1154)
Philip de Harcourt, Dean of Lincoln	1139	1140	Stephen (r. 1135–1154)
Robert of Ghent, Dean of York	1140	1141	Stephen (r. 1135–1154)
William FitzGilbert	1141	1142	Stephen (r. 1135–1154)
Robert of Ghent, Dean of York	1142	1154	Stephen (r. 1135–1154)
Thomas Becket, Archdeacon of Canterbury, later Archbishop of Canterbury	1155	1162	Henry II (r. 1154–1189)
Geoffrey Ridel, Archdeacon of Canterbury	1162	1173	Henry II (r. 1154–1189)
Ralph de Warneville, Treasurer of York	1173	1181	Henry II (r. 1154–1189)
Geoffrey, the Bastard, Archbishop of York	1181	1189	Henry II (r. 1154–1189)
William Longchamp, Bishop of Ely	1189	1197	Richard I (r. 1189–1199)
Eustace, Dean of Salisbury	1197	1199	Richard I (r. 1189–1199)
Eustace, Dean of Salisbury	1198	1199	Richard I (r. 1189–1199)
Hubert Walter, Archbishop of Canterbury	1199	1205	John (r. 1199–1216)
Walter de Gray, at various times Bishop of Lichfield, Bishop of Worcester, Archbishop of York	1205	1214	John (r. 1199–1216)
Richard Marsh, later Bishop of Durham	1214	1226	John (r. 1199–1216)
Richard Marsh, later Bishop of Durham	1214	1226	Henry III (r. 1216–1272)
Ralph Neville, Bishop of Chichester	1226	1240	Henry III (r. 1216–1272)
Richard le Gras, Abbot of Evesham	1240	1242	Henry III (r. 1216–1272)
Ralph Neville, Bishop of Chichester	1242	1244	Henry III (r. 1216–1272)
Silvester de Everdon, Archdeacon of Chester	1244	1246	Henry III (r. 1216–1272)
John Maunsell, Provost of Beverley	1246	1247	Henry III (r. 1216–1272)
John Lexington	1247	1248	Henry III (r. 1216–1272)
John Maunsell	1248	1249	Henry III (r. 1216–1272)
John Lexington	1249	1253	Henry III (r. 1216–1272)
Eleanor of Provence, (Note: Not Lord Chancellor as such, but exercised those functions as regent until she appointed William of Kilkenny; only woman to do so until Liz Truss was appointed in 2016.); Queen Consort and Regent of England	1253	1254	Henry III (r. 1216–1272)
William of Kilkenny	1254	1255	Henry III (r. 1216–1272)
Henry Wingham, from 1259/1260 Bishop of London	5 January 1255	18 October 1260	Henry III (r. 1216–1272)
Nicholas of Ely, Archdeacon of Ely	18 October 1260	12 July 1261	Henry III (r. 1216–1272)
Walter de Merton, Archdeacon of Bath	12 July 1261	19 July 1263	Henry III (r. 1216–1272)
Nicholas of Ely, Archdeacon of Ely	19 July 1263	November; 1263	Henry III (r. 1216–1272)
John Chishull, Archdeacon of London	November; 1263	1264	Henry III (r. 1216–1272)
Thomas Cantilupe, Archdeacon of Stafford	1264	21 February 1265	Henry III (r. 1216–1272)
Ralph Sandwich	21 February 1265	10 August 1265	Henry III (r. 1216–1272)
Walter Giffard, Bishop of Bath and Wells	10 August 1265	1266	Henry III (r. 1216–1272)
Godfrey Giffard, Archdeacon of Wells	1266	1268	Henry III (r. 1216–1272)
John Chishull, Dean of St Paul's	30 October 1268	29 July 1269	Henry III (r. 1216–1272)
Richard Middleton, Archdeacon of Northumberland	29 July 1269	Before 29 November 1272	Henry III (r. 1216–1272)
Walter de Merton, Archdeacon of Bath	Before 29 November 1272	21 September 1274	Edward I (r. 1272–1307)
Robert Burnell, Bishop of Bath and Wells	21 September 1274	17 December 1292	Edward I (r. 1272–1307)
Thomas Bek, Archdeacon of Dorset	1279	1279	Edward I (r. 1272–1307)
John Langton, Canon of Lincoln	17 December 1292	30 September 1302	Edward I (r. 1272–1307)
William Greenfield, Dean of Chichester	30 September 1302	29 December 1304	Edward I (r. 1272–1307)
William Hamilton, Dean of York	29 December 1304	21 April 1307	Edward I (r. 1272–1307)
Ralph Baldock, Bishop of London	21 April 1307	2 August 1307	Edward I (r. 1272–1307)
Ralph Baldock, Bishop of London	21 April 1307	2 August 1307	Edward II (r. 1307–1327)
John Langton, Bishop of Chichester	18 August 1307	6 July 1310	Edward II (r. 1307–1327)
Walter Reynolds, Bishop of Worcester	6 July 1310	26 September 1314	Edward II (r. 1307–1327)
John Sandale, Canon of Lincoln	26 September 1314	11 June 1318	Edward II (r. 1307–1327)
John Hotham, Bishop of Ely	11 June 1318	26 January 1320	Edward II (r. 1307–1327)
John Salmon, Bishop of Norwich	26 January 1320	20 August 1323	Edward II (r. 1307–1327)
Robert Baldock, Archdeacon of Middlesex	20 August 1323	1326	Edward II (r. 1307–1327)
William Ayermin, Bishop of Norwich	1326	1327	Edward II (r. 1307–1327)
John Hotham, Bishop of Ely	26 January 1327	12 May 1328	Edward III (r. 1327–1377)
Henry Burghersh, Bishop of Lincoln	12 May 1328	28 November 1330	Edward III (r. 1327–1377)
John de Stratford, Bishop of Winchester	28 November 1330	28 September 1334	Edward III (r. 1327–1377)
Richard Bury, Bishop of Durham	28 September 1334	6 June 1335	Edward III (r. 1327–1377)
John de Stratford, Archbishop of Canterbury	6 June 1335	24 March 1337	Edward III (r. 1327–1377)
Robert de Stratford, Bishop of Chichester	24 March 1337	6 July 1338	Edward III (r. 1327–1377)
Richard Bintworth, Bishop of London	6 July 1338	28 April 1339	Edward III (r. 1327–1377)
John de Stratford, Archbishop of Canterbury	28 April 1340	20 June 1340	Edward III (r. 1327–1377)
Robert de Stratford, Bishop of Chichester	20 June 1340	14 December 1340	Edward III (r. 1327–1377)
Robert Bourchier, Baron Bourchier	14 December 1340	28 October 1341	Edward III (r. 1327–1377)
Robert Parning	28 October 1341	29 September 1343	Edward III (r. 1327–1377)
Robert Sadington	29 September 1343	26 October 1345	Edward III (r. 1327–1377)
John de Ufford, Dean of Lincoln	26 October 1345	16 June 1349	Edward III (r. 1327–1377)
John Thoresby, Bishop of Worcester	16 June 1349	27 November 1356	Edward III (r. 1327–1377)
William Edington, Bishop of Winchester	27 November 1356	19 February 1363	Edward III (r. 1327–1377)
Simon Langham, Bishop of Ely	19 February 1363	Before 17 September 1367	Edward III (r. 1327–1377)
William of Wykeham, Bishop of Winchester	Before 17 September 1367	26 March 1371	Edward III (r. 1327–1377)
Robert Thorpe	26 March 1371	5 July 1372	Edward III (r. 1327–1377)
John Knyvet	5 July 1372	11 January 1377	Edward III (r. 1327–1377)
Adam Houghton, Bishop of St David's	11 January 1377	26 June 1378	Richard II (r. 1377–1399)
Richard Scrope, Baron Scrope of Bolton	29 October 1378	30 January 1380	Richard II (r. 1377–1399)
Simon Sudbury, Archbishop of Canterbury	30 January 1380	10 August 1381	Richard II (r. 1377–1399)
Hugh Segrave	1381	1381	Richard II (r. 1377–1399)
William Courtenay, Bishop of London	10 August 1381	4 December 1381	Richard II (r. 1377–1399)
Richard Scrope, Baron Scrope of Bolton	4 December 1381	9 September 1382	Richard II (r. 1377–1399)
Robert Braybrooke, Bishop of London	9 September 1382	13 March 1383	Richard II (r. 1377–1399)
Michael de la Pole, Baron de la Pole (later Earl of Suffolk)	13 March 1383	24 October 1386	Richard II (r. 1377–1399)
Thomas Arundel, Bishop of Ely	24 October 1386	4 May 1389	Richard II (r. 1377–1399)
William of Wykeham, Bishop of Winchester	4 May 1389	27 September 1391	Richard II (r. 1377–1399)
Thomas Arundel, Archbishop of York	27 September 1391	15 November 1396	Richard II (r. 1377–1399)
Edmund Stafford, Bishop of Exeter	15 November 1396	5 September 1399	Richard II (r. 1377–1399)
Thomas Arundel, Archbishop of Canterbury	5 September 1399	1399	Richard II (r. 1377–1399)
John Scarle, Archdeacon of Lincoln	1399	9 March 1401	Henry IV (r. 1399–1413)
Edmund Stafford, Bishop of Exeter	9 March 1401	26 February–1 March 1403	Henry IV (r. 1399–1413)
Henry Beaufort, Bishop of Lincoln	26 February–1 March 1403	c. 28 February 1405	Henry IV (r. 1399–1413)
Thomas Langley, Dean of York	c. 28 February 1405	30 January 1407	Henry IV (r. 1399–1413)
Thomas Arundel, Archbishop of Canterbury	30 January 1407	31 January 1410	Henry IV (r. 1399–1413)
Sir Thomas Beaufort	31 January 1410	5 January 1412	Henry IV (r. 1399–1413)
Thomas Arundel, Archbishop of Canterbury	5 January 1412	21 March 1413	Henry IV (r. 1399–1413)
Henry Beaufort, Bishop of Winchester	21 March 1413	23 July 1417	Henry V (r. 1413–1422)
Thomas Langley, Bishop of Durham	23 July 1417	6 July 1424 (Note: Reappointed on 16 November 1422)	Henry V (r. 1413–1422)
Thomas Langley, Bishop of Durham	23 July 1417	6 July 1424	Henry VI (r. 1422–1461)
Henry Beaufort, Bishop of Winchester	6 July 1424	16 March 1426	Henry VI (r. 1422–1461)
John Kemp, Archbishop of York	16 March 1426	4 March 1432	Henry VI (r. 1422–1461)
John Stafford, Bishop of Bath and Wells (later Archbishop of Canterbury)	4 March 1432	31 January 1450	Henry VI (r. 1422–1461)
John Kemp, Archbishop of York	31 January 1450	2 April 1454	Henry VI (r. 1422–1461)
Richard Neville, Earl of Salisbury	2 April 1454	7 March 1455	Henry VI (r. 1422–1461)
Thomas Bourchier, Archbishop of Canterbury	7 March 1455	11 October 1456	Henry VI (r. 1422–1461)
William Waynflete, Bishop of Winchester	11 October 1456	25 July 1460	Henry VI (r. 1422–1461)
George Neville, Bishop of Exeter	25 July 1460	20 June 1467 (Note: Reappointed on 10 March 1461)	Henry VI (r. 1422–1461)
George Neville, Bishop of Exeter	25 July 1460	20 June 1467	Edward IV (r. 1461–1470)
Robert Stillington, Bishop of Bath and Wells	20 June 1467	29 September 1470	Edward IV (r. 1461–1470)
George Neville, Archbishop of York	29 September 1470	1471	Henry VI (r. 1470–1471)
Robert Stillington, Bishop of Bath and Wells	1471	27 July 1473	Edward IV (r. 1471–1483)
Laurence Booth, Bishop of Durham	27 July 1473	Before 28 May 1474	Edward IV (r. 1471–1483)
John Alcock, Bishop of Rochester	10 June 1475	28 September 1475	Edward IV (r. 1471–1483)
Thomas Rotheram, Bishop of Lincoln	Before 28 May 1475	9 April–13 May 1483	Edward IV (r. 1471–1483)
John Russell, Bishop of Lincoln	9 April–13 May 1483	18 September 1485 (Note: Reappointed on 27 June 1483)	Richard III (r. 1483–1485)
Thomas Rotheram, Archbishop of York	18 September 1485	7 October 1485	Henry VII (r. 1485–1509)
John Alcock, Bishop of Worcester	7 October 1485	6 March 1487	Henry VII (r. 1485–1509)
John Morton, Cardinal Archbishop of Canterbury	6 March 1487	21 January 1504	Henry VII (r. 1485–1509)
Henry Deane, Archbishop of Canterbury	13 October 1500	27 July 1502	Henry VII (r. 1485–1509)
William Warham, Archbishop of Canterbury	21 January 1502 (Note: Keeper since 11 August 1502)	24 December 1515	Henry VII (r. 1485–1509)
William Warham, Archbishop of Canterbury	21 January 1502	24 December 1515	Henry VIII (r. 1509–1547)
Thomas Wolsey, Cardinal Archbishop of York	24 December 1515	26 October 1529	Henry VIII (r. 1509–1547)
Thomas More (Note: A former Speaker of the House of Commons.)	26 October 1529	16 May 1532	Henry VIII (r. 1509–1547)
Thomas Audley (Baron Audley of Walden from 1538)	26 January 1533 (Note: Keeper since 20 May 1532)	3 May 1544	Henry VIII (r. 1509–1547)
Thomas Wriothesley, 1st Baron Wriothesley	3 May 1544 (Note: Keeper since 22 April 1544)	1547	Henry VIII (r. 1509–1547)
Thomas Wriothesley, 1st Baron Wriothesley	3 May 1544	1547	Edward VI (r. 1547–1553)
William Paulet, Baron St John; Keeper	1547	23 October 1547	Edward VI (r. 1547–1553)
Richard Rich, 1st Baron Rich	23 October 1547	19 January 1552	Edward VI (r. 1547–1553)
Thomas Goodrich, Bishop of Ely	19 January 1552	23 August 1553	Edward VI (r. 1547–1553)
Stephen Gardiner, Bishop of Winchester	23 August 1553	14 November 1555	Mary I (r. 1553–1558)
Nicholas Heath, Archbishop of York	14 November 1555	18 November 1558	Mary I (r. 1553–1558)
With the queen	18 November 1558	22 December 1558	Elizabeth I (r. 1558–1603)
Nicholas Bacon, Lord Keeper	22 December 1558	20 February 1579	Elizabeth I (r. 1558–1603)
With the queen	20 February 1579	26 April 1579	Elizabeth I (r. 1558–1603)
Thomas Bromley	26 April 1579	29 April 1587	Elizabeth I (r. 1558–1603)
Christopher Hatton	29 April 1587	22 November 1591	Elizabeth I (r. 1558–1603)
In commission: Commissioners of the Great Seal; William Cecil, 1st Baron Burghley; Henry Carey, 1st Baron Hunsdon; William Brooke, 10th Baron Cobham; Thomas Sackville, 1st Baron Buckhurst; Commissioners to hear causes; Gilbert Gerard and others	22 November 1591	28 May 1592	Elizabeth I (r. 1558–1603)
John Puckering, Lord Keeper	28 May 1592	6 May 1596	Elizabeth I (r. 1558–1603)
Sir Thomas Egerton, Lord Keeper to 19 July 1603 (Lord Ellesmere from 1603; Viscount Brackley from 1616)	6 May 1596	5 March 1617	Elizabeth I (r. 1558–1603)
Sir Thomas Egerton, Lord Keeper to 19 July 1603 (Lord Ellesmere from 1603; Viscount Brackley from 1616)	6 May 1596	5 March 1617	James I (r. 1603–1625)
Francis Bacon, Lord Keeper to 1618 (Lord Verulam from 1618; Viscount St Alban from 1621)	7 March 1617	1 May 1621	James I (r. 1603–1625)
In commission: Commissioners to hear causes in the Court of Chancery; Julius Caesar and others; Commissioners to hear causes in the House of Lords; James Ley and others; Commissioners to use the Great Seal; Henry Montagu, 1st Viscount Mandeville; Ludovic Stewart, 2nd Duke of Lennox; Thomas Howard, 21st Earl of Arundel	1 May 1621	16 July 1621	James I (r. 1603–1625)
John Williams, Bishop of Lincoln, Lord Keeper	16 July 1621	1 November 1625	James I (r. 1603–1625)
John Williams, Bishop of Lincoln, Lord Keeper	16 July 1621	1 November 1625	Charles I (r. 1625–1649)
Thomas Coventry, Lord Keeper (Lord Coventry from 1628)	1625	1640	Charles I (r. 1625–1649)
John Finch, Baron Finch, Lord Keeper	1640	1641	Charles I (r. 1625–1649)
Edward Littleton, 1st Baron Lyttelton, Lord Keeper (Took Great Seal to the King in 1642)	1641	1645	Charles I (r. 1625–1649)
Richard Lane, Lord Keeper	1645	1650	Charles I (r. 1625–1649)
Richard Lane, Lord Keeper	1645	1650	Charles II Court in exile from 1649
Vacant	1650	1653	Charles II Court in exile from 1649
Edward Herbert, Lord Keeper	1653	1654	Charles II Court in exile from 1649

The Great Seal was captured and destroyed by Parliament on 11 August 1646.

=== Commissioners of Parliament's Great Seal 1643–1660 ===
Name	Term
In commission: Henry Grey, 10th Earl of Kent; Oliver St John, 1st Earl of Bolingbroke died July 1646; Oliver St John; John Wilde; Samuel Browne; Edmund Prideaux; William Cecil, 2nd Earl of Salisbury replacing Bolingbroke	Nov 1643 – Oct 1646
In commission: William Cecil, 2nd Earl of Salisbury; Edward Montagu, 2nd Earl of Manchester; William Lenthall (as Speaker of the House of Commons)	1646–1648
In commission: Henry Grey, 10th Earl of Kent; William Grey, 1st Baron Grey of Werke; Thomas Widdrington; Bulstrode Whitelocke	1648–1649
In commission: Bulstrode Whitelocke; John Lisle; Richard Keble	1649–1654
In commission: Bulstrode Whitelocke; Thomas Widdrington; John Lisle	1654–1656
In commission: Nathaniel Fiennes; John Lisle	1656–1659
In commission: Nathaniel Fiennes; John Lisle; Bulstrode Whitelocke	January–June 1659
In commission: John Bradshaw; Thomas Tyrrell; John Fountaine	June 1659 – 1660
In commission: William Lenthall; Thomas Widdrington; Thomas Tyrrell; John Fountaine; Edward Montagu, 2nd Earl of Manchester	1660–1660

=== From the Restoration (1660) to the Act of Union (1707) ===
Lord Chancellor and Lord Keeper	Term of office		Other peerage(s)	Monarch (reign)
Edward Hyde	13 January 1658	30 August 1667	Baron Hyde in 1660; Earl of Clarendon in 1661	Charles II (r. 1660–1685)
Orlando Bridgeman (Note: Lord Keeper of the Great Seal)	31 August 1667	17 November 1672	—	Charles II (r. 1660–1685)
Anthony Ashley Cooper; 1st Earl of Shaftesbury	17 November 1672	9 November 1673		Charles II (r. 1660–1685)
Heneage Finch; Baron Finch (Lord Keeper until 1675)	9 November 1673	18 December 1682^{†}	Earl of Nottingham from 12 May 1681	Charles II (r. 1660–1685)
Francis North	20 December 1682	5 September 1685^{†}	Baron Guilford in 1683	Charles II (r. 1660–1685)
Francis North	20 December 1682	5 September 1685^{†}	Baron Guilford in 1683	James II (r. 1685–1688)
George Jeffreys; 1st Baron Jeffreys	28 September 1685	December; 1688	—	James II (r. 1685–1688)
In commission: John Maynard; Anthony Keck; William Rawlinson	4 March 1689	14 May 1690	—	Mary II (r. 1689–1694) & William III (r. 1689–1702)
In commission: John Trevor; William Rawlinson; George Hutchins	14 May 1690	22 March 1693	—	Mary II (r. 1689–1694) & William III (r. 1689–1702)
John Somers (Lord Keeper until 1697)	23 March 1693	27 April 1700	Baron Somers from 1697	Mary II (r. 1689–1694) & William III (r. 1689–1702)
In commission: John Holt, Lord Chief Justice; George Treby, Chief Justice of the Common Pleas; Edward Ward, Chief Baron of the Exchequer	27 April 1700	31 May 1700	—	Mary II (r. 1689–1694) & William III (r. 1689–1702)
Nathan Wright	31 May 1700	11 October 1705	—	Mary II (r. 1689–1694) & William III (r. 1689–1702)
Nathan Wright	31 May 1700	11 October 1705	—	Anne (r. 1702–1714)
William Cowper	11 October 1705	4 May 1707	Baron Cowper in 1706	Anne (r. 1702–1714)

== Lords high chancellor and lords keeper of Great Britain (1707–present) ==
High Chancellor and Lord Keeper	Term of office		Party	Ministry	Other peerage(s)	Monarch (Reign)
William Cowper, 1st Baron Cowper (1st time)	4 May 1707	23 September 1710	—	Godolphin–Marlborough	see below	Anne (r. 1702–1714)
William Cowper, 1st Baron Cowper (1st time)	4 May 1707	23 September 1710	—	Oxford–Bolingbroke	see below	Anne (r. 1702–1714)
In commission: Thomas Trevor, Chief Justice of the Common Pleas; Robert Tracy, Justice of the Common Pleas; John Scrope, Baron of the Exchequer	26 September 1710	19 October 1710	—	Oxford–Bolingbroke	—	Anne (r. 1702–1714)
Simon Harcourt, 1st Baron Harcourt (Note: Lord Keeper of the Great Seal until 7 April 1713.)	19 October 1710	21 September 1714	Tory	Oxford–Bolingbroke	Viscount Harcourt in 1721	Anne (r. 1702–1714)
William Cowper, 1st Baron Cowper (2nd time)	21 September 1714	15 April 1718	—	Townshend	Earl Cowper in 1718	George I (r. 1714–1727)
William Cowper, 1st Baron Cowper (2nd time)	21 September 1714	15 April 1718	—	Stanhope–Sunderland I	Earl Cowper in 1718	George I (r. 1714–1727)
In commission: Robert Tracy, Justice of the Common Pleas; John Pratt, Justice of the King's Bench; James Montagu, Baron of the Exchequer	18 April 1718	12 May 1718	—	Stanhope–Sunderland II	—	George I (r. 1714–1727)
Thomas Parker, 1st Baron Parker	12 May 1718	7 January 1725	Whig	Stanhope–Sunderland II	Earl of Macclesfield in 1721	George I (r. 1714–1727)
Thomas Parker, 1st Baron Parker	12 May 1718	7 January 1725	Whig	Walpole–Townshend	Earl of Macclesfield in 1721	George I (r. 1714–1727)
In commission: Joseph Jekyll, Master of the Rolls; Jeffrey Gilbert, Baron of the Exchequer; Robert Raymond, Lord Chief Justice of the King's Bench	7 January 1725	1 June 1725	—	Walpole–Townshend	—	George I (r. 1714–1727)
Peter King, 1st Baron King	1 June 1725	29 November 1733	—	Walpole–Townshend	—	George I (r. 1714–1727)
Peter King, 1st Baron King	1 June 1725	29 November 1733	—	Walpole–Townshend	—	George II (r. 1727–1760)
Peter King, 1st Baron King	1 June 1725	29 November 1733	—	Walpole	—	George II (r. 1727–1760)
Charles Talbot, 1st Baron Talbot	29 November 1733	14 February 1737^{†}	—	Walpole	—	George II (r. 1727–1760)
Philip Yorke, 1st Baron Hardwicke	21 February 1737	19 November 1756	Whig	Walpole	Earl of Hardwicke in 1754	George II (r. 1727–1760)
Philip Yorke, 1st Baron Hardwicke	21 February 1737	19 November 1756	Whig	Carteret	Earl of Hardwicke in 1754	George II (r. 1727–1760)
Philip Yorke, 1st Baron Hardwicke	21 February 1737	19 November 1756	Whig	Broad Bottom (I & II)	Earl of Hardwicke in 1754	George II (r. 1727–1760)
Philip Yorke, 1st Baron Hardwicke	21 February 1737	19 November 1756	Whig	Newcastle I	Earl of Hardwicke in 1754	George II (r. 1727–1760)
In commission: John Willes, Chief Justice of the Common Pleas; Sidney Stafford Smythe, Baron of the Exchequer; John Eardley Wilmot, Justice of the King's Bench	19 November 1756	30 June 1757	—	Pitt–Devonshire	—	George II (r. 1727–1760)
In commission: John Willes, Chief Justice of the Common Pleas; Sidney Stafford Smythe, Baron of the Exchequer; John Eardley Wilmot, Justice of the King's Bench	19 November 1756	30 June 1757	—	1757 Caretaker	—	George II (r. 1727–1760)
Robert Henley, 1st Baron Henley (Note: Lord Keeper of the Great Seal until 16 January 1761.)	30 June 1757	30 July 1766	Whig	Pitt–Newcastle	Earl of Northington in 1764	George II (r. 1727–1760)
Robert Henley, 1st Baron Henley	30 June 1757	30 July 1766	Whig	Pitt–Newcastle	Earl of Northington in 1764	George III (1760–1820) (Note: George, Prince of Wales served as prince regent from 5 February 1811.)
Robert Henley, 1st Baron Henley	30 June 1757	30 July 1766	Whig	Bute	Earl of Northington in 1764	George III (1760–1820)
Robert Henley, 1st Baron Henley	30 June 1757	30 July 1766	Whig	Grenville (Whig–Tory)	Earl of Northington in 1764	George III (1760–1820)
Robert Henley, 1st Baron Henley	30 June 1757	30 July 1766	Whig	Rockingham I	Earl of Northington in 1764	George III (1760–1820)
Charles Pratt, 1st Baron Camden	30 July 1766	17 January 1770	Whig	Chatham (Whig–Tory)	Earl Camden in 1786	George III (1760–1820)
Charles Pratt, 1st Baron Camden	30 July 1766	17 January 1770	Whig	Grafton (Whig–Tory)	Earl Camden in 1786	George III (1760–1820)
Charles Yorke; MP for Cambridge University	17 January 1770	20 January 1770^{†}	Whig	Grafton (Whig–Tory)	(Note: Charles Yorke, who had been associated with the opposition, was persuaded to accept appointment as Lord Chancellor and was to have been created Baron Morden. However on meeting with his erstwhile opposition colleagues he became ashamed of his action. He refused to sign the patent conferring the peerage on himself and then committed suicide.)	George III (1760–1820)
In commission: Sidney Stafford Smythe, Baron of the Exchequer; Henry Bathurst, Justice of the Common Pleas; Richard Aston, Justice of the King's Bench	21 January 1770	23 January 1771	—	North	—	George III (1760–1820)
Henry Bathurst, 1st Baron Apsley	23 January 1771	3 June 1778	Tory	North	Succeeded as Earl Bathurst in 1775	George III (1760–1820)
Edward Thurlow, 1st Baron Thurlow (1st time)	3 June 1778	7 April 1783	Tory	North	see below	George III (1760–1820)
Edward Thurlow, 1st Baron Thurlow (1st time)	3 June 1778	7 April 1783	Tory	Rockingham II	see below	George III (1760–1820)
Edward Thurlow, 1st Baron Thurlow (1st time)	3 June 1778	7 April 1783	Tory	Shelburne (Whig–Tory)	see below	George III (1760–1820)
In commission: Alexander Wedderburn, 1st Baron Loughborough, Chief Justice of the Common Pleas; William Henry Ashurst, Justice of the King's Bench; Beaumont Hotham, Baron of the Exchequer	9 April 1783	23 December 1783	—	Fox–North (Whig–Tory)	—	George III (1760–1820)
Edward Thurlow, 1st Baron Thurlow (2nd time)	23 December 1783	15 June 1792	Tory	Pitt I	Baron Thurlow in 1792	George III (1760–1820)
In commission: James Eyre, Chief Baron of the Exchequer; William Henry Ashurst, Justice of the King's Bench; John Wilson, Justice of the Common Pleas	15 June 1792	28 January 1793	—	Pitt I	—	George III (1760–1820)
Alexander Wedderburn, 1st Baron Loughborough	28 January 1793	14 April 1801	—	Pitt I	Earl of Rosslyn in 1801	George III (1760–1820)
John Scott, 1st Baron Eldon (1st time)	14 April 1801	7 February 1806	Tory	Addington	see below	George III (1760–1820)
John Scott, 1st Baron Eldon (1st time)	14 April 1801	7 February 1806	Tory	Pitt II	see below	George III (1760–1820)
Thomas Erskine, 1st Baron Erskine	7 February 1806	1 April 1807	Whig	All the Talents (Whig–Tory)	—	George III (1760–1820)
John Scott, 1st Baron Eldon (2nd time)	1 April 1807	12 April 1827	Tory	Portland II	Earl of Eldon in 1821	George III (1760–1820)
John Scott, 1st Baron Eldon (2nd time)	1 April 1807	12 April 1827	Tory	Perceval	Earl of Eldon in 1821	George III (1760–1820)
John Scott, 1st Baron Eldon (2nd time)	1 April 1807	12 April 1827	Tory	Liverpool	Earl of Eldon in 1821	George III (1760–1820)
John Scott, 1st Baron Eldon (2nd time)	1 April 1807	12 April 1827	Tory	Liverpool	Earl of Eldon in 1821	George IV (r. 1820–1830)
John Copley, 1st Baron Lyndhurst (1st time)	2 May 1827	24 November 1830	Tory	Canning (Canningite–Whig)	—	George IV (r. 1820–1830)
John Copley, 1st Baron Lyndhurst (1st time)	2 May 1827	24 November 1830	Tory	Goderich (Canningite–Whig)	—	George IV (r. 1820–1830)
John Copley, 1st Baron Lyndhurst (1st time)	2 May 1827	24 November 1830	Tory	Wellington–Peel	—	George IV (r. 1820–1830)
John Copley, 1st Baron Lyndhurst (1st time)	2 May 1827	24 November 1830	Tory	Wellington–Peel	—	William IV (r. 1830–1837)
Henry Brougham, 1st Baron Brougham and Vaux	24 November 1830	21 November 1834	Whig	Grey	Baron Brougham and Vaux in 1860	William IV (r. 1830–1837)
Henry Brougham, 1st Baron Brougham and Vaux	24 November 1830	21 November 1834	Whig	Melbourne I	Baron Brougham and Vaux in 1860	William IV (r. 1830–1837)
John Copley, 1st Baron Lyndhurst (2nd time)	21 November 1834	8 April 1835	Conservative	Wellington Caretaker	—	William IV (r. 1830–1837)
John Copley, 1st Baron Lyndhurst (2nd time)	21 November 1834	8 April 1835	Conservative	Peel I	—	William IV (r. 1830–1837)
In commission: Charles Pepys, Master of the Rolls; Lancelot Shadwell, Vice-Chancellor of England; John Bosanquet, Justice of the Common Pleas	23 April 1835	16 January 1836	—	Melbourne II	—	William IV (r. 1830–1837)
Charles Pepys, 1st Baron Cottenham (1st time)	16 January 1836	30 August 1841	Whig	Melbourne II	see below	William IV (r. 1830–1837)
Charles Pepys, 1st Baron Cottenham (1st time)	16 January 1836	30 August 1841	Whig	Melbourne II	see below	Victoria (r. 1837–1901)
John Copley, 1st Baron Lyndhurst (3rd time)	3 September 1841	27 June 1846	Conservative	Peel II	—	Victoria (r. 1837–1901)
Charles Pepys, 1st Baron Cottenham (2nd time)	6 July 1846	19 June 1850	Whig	Russell I	Earl of Cottenham in 1850	Victoria (r. 1837–1901)
In commission: Henry Bickersteth, 1st Baron Langdale, Master of the Rolls; Lancelot Shadwell, Vice Chancellor of England; Robert Rolfe, Baron of the Exchequer	19 June 1850	15 July 1850	—	Russell I	—	Victoria (r. 1837–1901)
Thomas Wilde, 1st Baron Truro	15 July 1850	21 February 1852	Whig	Russell I	—	Victoria (r. 1837–1901)
Edward Sugden, 1st Baron St Leonards (Note: A former Lord High Chancellor of Ireland.)	27 February 1852	17 December 1852	Conservative	Who? Who?	—	Victoria (r. 1837–1901)
Robert Rolfe, 1st Baron Cranworth (1st time)	28 December 1852	21 February 1858	Whig	Aberdeen (Peelite–Whig)	—	Victoria (r. 1837–1901)
Robert Rolfe, 1st Baron Cranworth (1st time)	28 December 1852	21 February 1858	Whig	Palmerston I	—	Victoria (r. 1837–1901)
Frederic Thesiger, 1st Baron Chelmsford (1st time)	26 February 1858	11 June 1859	Conservative	Derby–Disraeli II	—	Victoria (r. 1837–1901)
John Campbell, 1st Baron Campbell	18 June 1859	24 June 1861	Liberal	Palmerston II	—	Victoria (r. 1837–1901)
Richard Bethell, 1st Baron Westbury	26 June 1861	7 July 1865	Liberal	Palmerston II	—	Victoria (r. 1837–1901)
Robert Rolfe, 1st Baron Cranworth (2nd time)	7 July 1865	26 June 1866	Liberal	Palmerston II	—	Victoria (r. 1837–1901)
Robert Rolfe, 1st Baron Cranworth (2nd time)	7 July 1865	26 June 1866	Liberal	Russell II	—	Victoria (r. 1837–1901)
Frederic Thesiger, 1st Baron Chelmsford (2nd time)	6 July 1866	29 February 1868	Conservative	Derby–Disraeli III	—	Victoria (r. 1837–1901)
Hugh Cairns, 1st Baron Cairns (1st time)	29 February 1868	1 December 1868	Conservative	Derby–Disraeli III	see below	Victoria (r. 1837–1901)
William Wood, 1st Baron Hatherley	9 December 1868	15 October 1872	Liberal	Gladstone I	—	Victoria (r. 1837–1901)
Roundell Palmer, 1st Baron Selborne (1st time)	15 October 1872	17 February 1874	Liberal	Gladstone I	see below	Victoria (r. 1837–1901)
Hugh Cairns, 1st Baron Cairns (2nd time)	21 February 1874	21 April 1880	Conservative	Disraeli II	Earl Cairns in 1878	Victoria (r. 1837–1901)
Roundell Palmer, 1st Baron Selborne (2nd time)	28 April 1880	9 June 1885	Liberal	Gladstone II	Earl of Selborne in 1882	Victoria (r. 1837–1901)
Hardinge Giffard, 1st Baron Halsbury (1st time)	24 June 1885	28 January 1886	Conservative	Salisbury I	see below	Victoria (r. 1837–1901)
Farrer Herschell, 1st Baron Herschell (1st time)	6 February 1886	20 July 1886	Liberal	Gladstone III	—	Victoria (r. 1837–1901)
Hardinge Giffard, 1st Baron Halsbury (2nd time)	3 August 1886	11 August 1892	Conservative	Salisbury II	—	Victoria (r. 1837–1901)
Farrer Herschell, 1st Baron Herschell (2nd time)	18 August 1892	21 June 1895	Liberal	Gladstone IV	—	Victoria (r. 1837–1901)
Farrer Herschell, 1st Baron Herschell (2nd time)	18 August 1892	21 June 1895	Liberal	Rosebery	—	Victoria (r. 1837–1901)
Hardinge Giffard, 1st Baron Halsbury (3rd time)	29 June 1895	4 December 1905	Conservative	Salisbury (III & IV) (Con.–Lib.U.)	Earl of Halsbury in 1898	Victoria (r. 1837–1901)
Hardinge Giffard, 1st Baron Halsbury (3rd time)	29 June 1895	4 December 1905	Conservative	Salisbury (III & IV) (Con.–Lib.U.)	Earl of Halsbury in 1898	Edward VII (r. 1901–1910)
Hardinge Giffard, 1st Baron Halsbury (3rd time)	29 June 1895	4 December 1905	Conservative	Balfour (Con.–Lib.U.)	Earl of Halsbury in 1898	Edward VII (r. 1901–1910)
Robert Reid, 1st Baron Loreburn	10 December 1905	10 June 1912	Liberal	Campbell-Bannerman	Earl Loreburn in 1911	Edward VII (r. 1901–1910)
Robert Reid, 1st Baron Loreburn	10 December 1905	10 June 1912	Liberal	Asquith (I–III)	Earl Loreburn in 1911	Edward VII (r. 1901–1910)
Robert Reid, 1st Baron Loreburn	10 December 1905	10 June 1912	Liberal	Asquith (I–III)	Earl Loreburn in 1911	George V (r. 1910–1936)
Richard Haldane, 1st Viscount Haldane (1st time)	10 June 1912	25 May 1915	Liberal	Asquith (I–III)	—	George V (r. 1910–1936)
Stanley Buckmaster, 1st Baron Buckmaster	25 May 1915	5 December 1916	Liberal	Asquith Coalition (Lib.–Con.–Lab.)	Viscount Buckmaster in 1933	George V (r. 1910–1936)
Robert Finlay, 1st Baron Finlay	10 December 1916	10 January 1919	Conservative	Lloyd George (I & II) (Lib.–Con.–Lab.)	Viscount Finlay in 1919	George V (r. 1910–1936)
F. E. Smith, 1st Baron Birkenhead	10 January 1919	19 October 1922	Conservative	Lloyd George (I & II) (Lib.–Con.–Lab.)	Viscount Birkenhead in 1921; Earl of Birkenhead in 1922	George V (r. 1910–1936)
George Cave, 1st Viscount Cave (1st time)	24 October 1922	22 January 1924	Conservative	Law	—	George V (r. 1910–1936)
George Cave, 1st Viscount Cave (1st time)	24 October 1922	22 January 1924	Conservative	Baldwin I	—	George V (r. 1910–1936)
Richard Haldane, 1st Viscount Haldane (2nd time)	22 January 1924	6 November 1924	Labour	MacDonald I	—	George V (r. 1910–1936)
George Cave, 1st Viscount Cave (2nd time)	6 November 1924	28 March 1928	Conservative	Baldwin II	—	George V (r. 1910–1936)
Douglas Hogg, 1st Baron Hailsham (1st time)	28 March 1928	4 June 1929	Conservative	Baldwin II	Viscount Hailsham in 1929	George V (r. 1910–1936)
John Sankey, 1st Baron Sankey	7 June 1929	7 June 1935	Labour	MacDonald II	Viscount Sankey in 1932	George V (r. 1910–1936)
John Sankey, 1st Baron Sankey	7 June 1929	7 June 1935	National Labour	National I (N.Lab.–Con.–N.Lib. –Lib.)	Viscount Sankey in 1932	George V (r. 1910–1936)
John Sankey, 1st Baron Sankey	7 June 1929	7 June 1935	National Labour	National II (N.Lab.–Con.–N.Lib. –Lib. until 1932)	Viscount Sankey in 1932	George V (r. 1910–1936)
Douglas Hogg, 1st Viscount Hailsham (2nd time)	7 June 1935	9 March 1938	Conservative	National III (Con.–N.Lab.–N.Lib.)	—	George V (r. 1910–1936)
Douglas Hogg, 1st Viscount Hailsham (2nd time)	7 June 1935	9 March 1938	Conservative	National III (Con.–N.Lab.–N.Lib.)	—	Edward VIII (1936)
Douglas Hogg, 1st Viscount Hailsham (2nd time)	7 June 1935	9 March 1938	Conservative	National IV (Con.–N.Lab.–N.Lib.)	—	George VI (r. 1936–1952)
Frederic Maugham, Baron Maugham	9 March 1938	3 September 1939	Conservative	National IV (Con.–N.Lab.–N.Lib.)	Viscount Maugham in 1939	George VI (r. 1936–1952)
Thomas Inskip, 1st Viscount Caldecote	3 September 1939	12 May 1940	Conservative	Chamberlain War (Con.–N.Lab.–N.Lib.)	—	George VI (r. 1936–1952)
John Simon, 1st Viscount Simon	10 May 1940	27 July 1945	National Liberal	Churchill War (All parties)	—	George VI (r. 1936–1952)
John Simon, 1st Viscount Simon	10 May 1940	27 July 1945	National Liberal	Churchill Caretaker (Con.–N.Lib.)	—	George VI (r. 1936–1952)
William Jowitt, 1st Baron Jowitt	27 July 1945	26 October 1951	Labour	Attlee (I & II)	Viscount Jowitt in 1947; Earl Jowitt in 1951	George VI (r. 1936–1952)
Gavin Simonds, Baron Simonds	30 October 1951	18 October 1954	Conservative	Churchill III	Baron Simonds in 1952; Viscount Simonds in 1954	George VI (r. 1936–1952)
Gavin Simonds, Baron Simonds	30 October 1951	18 October 1954	Conservative	Churchill III	Baron Simonds in 1952; Viscount Simonds in 1954	Elizabeth II (r. 1952–2022)
David Maxwell Fyfe, 1st Viscount Kilmuir	18 October 1954	13 July 1962	Conservative	Churchill III	Earl of Kilmuir in 1962	Elizabeth II (r. 1952–2022)
David Maxwell Fyfe, 1st Viscount Kilmuir	18 October 1954	13 July 1962	Conservative	Eden	Earl of Kilmuir in 1962	Elizabeth II (r. 1952–2022)
David Maxwell Fyfe, 1st Viscount Kilmuir	18 October 1954	13 July 1962	Conservative	Macmillan (I & II)	Earl of Kilmuir in 1962	Elizabeth II (r. 1952–2022)
Reginald Manningham-Buller, 1st Baron Dilhorne	13 July 1962	16 October 1964	Conservative	Macmillan (I & II)	Viscount Dilhorne in 1962	Elizabeth II (r. 1952–2022)
Reginald Manningham-Buller, 1st Baron Dilhorne	13 July 1962	16 October 1964	Conservative	Douglas-Home	Viscount Dilhorne in 1962	Elizabeth II (r. 1952–2022)
Gerald Gardiner, Baron Gardiner	16 October 1964	19 June 1970	Labour	Wilson (I & II)	—	Elizabeth II (r. 1952–2022)
Quintin Hogg, Baron Hailsham of St Marylebone (1st time)	20 June 1970	4 March 1974	Conservative	Heath	—	Elizabeth II (r. 1952–2022)
Frederick Elwyn Jones, Baron Elwyn-Jones	5 March 1974	4 May 1979	Labour	Wilson (III & IV)	—	Elizabeth II (r. 1952–2022)
Frederick Elwyn Jones, Baron Elwyn-Jones	5 March 1974	4 May 1979	Labour	Callaghan	—	Elizabeth II (r. 1952–2022)
Quintin Hogg, Baron Hailsham of St Marylebone (2nd time)	4 May 1979	13 June 1987	Conservative	Thatcher I	—	Elizabeth II (r. 1952–2022)
Quintin Hogg, Baron Hailsham of St Marylebone (2nd time)	4 May 1979	13 June 1987	Conservative	Thatcher II	—	Elizabeth II (r. 1952–2022)
Michael Havers, Baron Havers	13 June 1987	26 October 1987	Conservative	Thatcher III	—	Elizabeth II (r. 1952–2022)
James Mackay, Baron Mackay of Clashfern	28 October 1987	2 May 1997	Conservative	Thatcher III	—	Elizabeth II (r. 1952–2022)
James Mackay, Baron Mackay of Clashfern	28 October 1987	2 May 1997	Conservative	Major I	—	Elizabeth II (r. 1952–2022)
James Mackay, Baron Mackay of Clashfern	28 October 1987	2 May 1997	Conservative	Major II	—	Elizabeth II (r. 1952–2022)
Derry Irvine, Baron Irvine of Lairg	2 May 1997	12 June 2003	Labour	Blair I	—	Elizabeth II (r. 1952–2022)
Derry Irvine, Baron Irvine of Lairg	2 May 1997	12 June 2003	Labour	Blair II	—	Elizabeth II (r. 1952–2022)
Charlie Falconer, Baron Falconer of Thoroton	12 June 2003	28 June 2007	Labour	Blair II	—	Elizabeth II (r. 1952–2022)
Charlie Falconer, Baron Falconer of Thoroton	12 June 2003	28 June 2007	Labour	Blair III	—	Elizabeth II (r. 1952–2022)
Jack Straw (Note: First non-peer to serve as Lord Chancellor since Robert Henley as Lord Keeper of the Seal in 1760.); MP for Blackburn	28 June 2007	11 May 2010	Labour	Brown	—	Elizabeth II (r. 1952–2022)
Kenneth Clarke; MP for Rushcliffe	12 May 2010	4 September 2012	Conservative	Cameron–Clegg (Con.–L.D.)	Baron Clarke of Nottingham for Life in 2020	Elizabeth II (r. 1952–2022)
Chris Grayling; MP for Epsom and Ewell	4 September 2012	9 May 2015	Conservative	Cameron–Clegg (Con.–L.D.)	Baron Grayling for Life in 2024	Elizabeth II (r. 1952–2022)
Michael Gove; MP for Surrey Heath	9 May 2015	14 July 2016	Conservative	Cameron II	Baron Gove for Life in 2025	Elizabeth II (r. 1952–2022)
Liz Truss (Note: First woman to hold the office, and first to exercise its functions since Eleanor of Provence in 1254.); MP for South West Norfolk	14 July 2016	11 June 2017	Conservative	May I	—	Elizabeth II (r. 1952–2022)
David Lidington; MP for Aylesbury	11 June 2017	8 January 2018	Conservative	May II	—	Elizabeth II (r. 1952–2022)
David Gauke; MP for South West Hertfordshire	8 January 2018	24 July 2019	Conservative	May II	—	Elizabeth II (r. 1952–2022)
Robert Buckland; MP for South Swindon	24 July 2019	15 September 2021	Conservative	Johnson I	—	Elizabeth II (r. 1952–2022)
Robert Buckland; MP for South Swindon	24 July 2019	15 September 2021	Conservative	Johnson II	—	Elizabeth II (r. 1952–2022)
Dominic Raab; MP for Esher and Walton (1st time)	15 September 2021	6 September 2022	Conservative	Johnson II	—	Elizabeth II (r. 1952–2022)
Brandon Lewis; MP for Great Yarmouth	6 September 2022	25 October 2022	Conservative	Truss	—	Elizabeth II (r. 1952–2022)
Brandon Lewis; MP for Great Yarmouth	6 September 2022	25 October 2022	Conservative	Truss	—	Charles III (2022–present)
Dominic Raab; MP for Esher and Walton (2nd time)	27 October 2022	21 April 2023	Conservative	Sunak	—	Charles III (2022–present)
Alex Chalk; MP for Cheltenham	26 April 2023	5 July 2024	Conservative	Sunak	—	Charles III (2022–present)
Shabana Mahmood; MP for Birmingham Ladywood	5 July 2024	5 September 2025	Labour	Starmer	—	Charles III (2022–present)
David Lammy MP for Tottenham	5 September 2025	20 July 2026	Labour	Starmer	—	Charles III (2022–present)
Alex Norris; MP for Nottingham North and Kimberley	20 July 2026	Incumbent	Labour Co-op	Burnham	—	Charles III (2022–present)

== Sources ==
- John Haydn and Horace Ockerby, The Book of Dignities, third edition, W.H. Allen and Co. Ltd, London 1894, reprinted Firecrest Publishing Limited, Bath 1969, p. 352–358
- John Lord Campbell (1845) Lives of the Lords Chancellors and Keepers of the Great Seal of England. 5th ed. (1868) London: Murray, vol. 10
- Fryde, E. B.; Greenway, D. E.; Porter, S.; Roy, I. (1996). Handbook of British Chronology (Third revised ed.). Cambridge, UK: Cambridge University Press. ISBN 0-521-56350-X.
