= Chancellor of the Order of the Garter =

Officer of the Order of the Garter

The Chancellor of the Order of the Garter is an officer of the Order of the Garter.

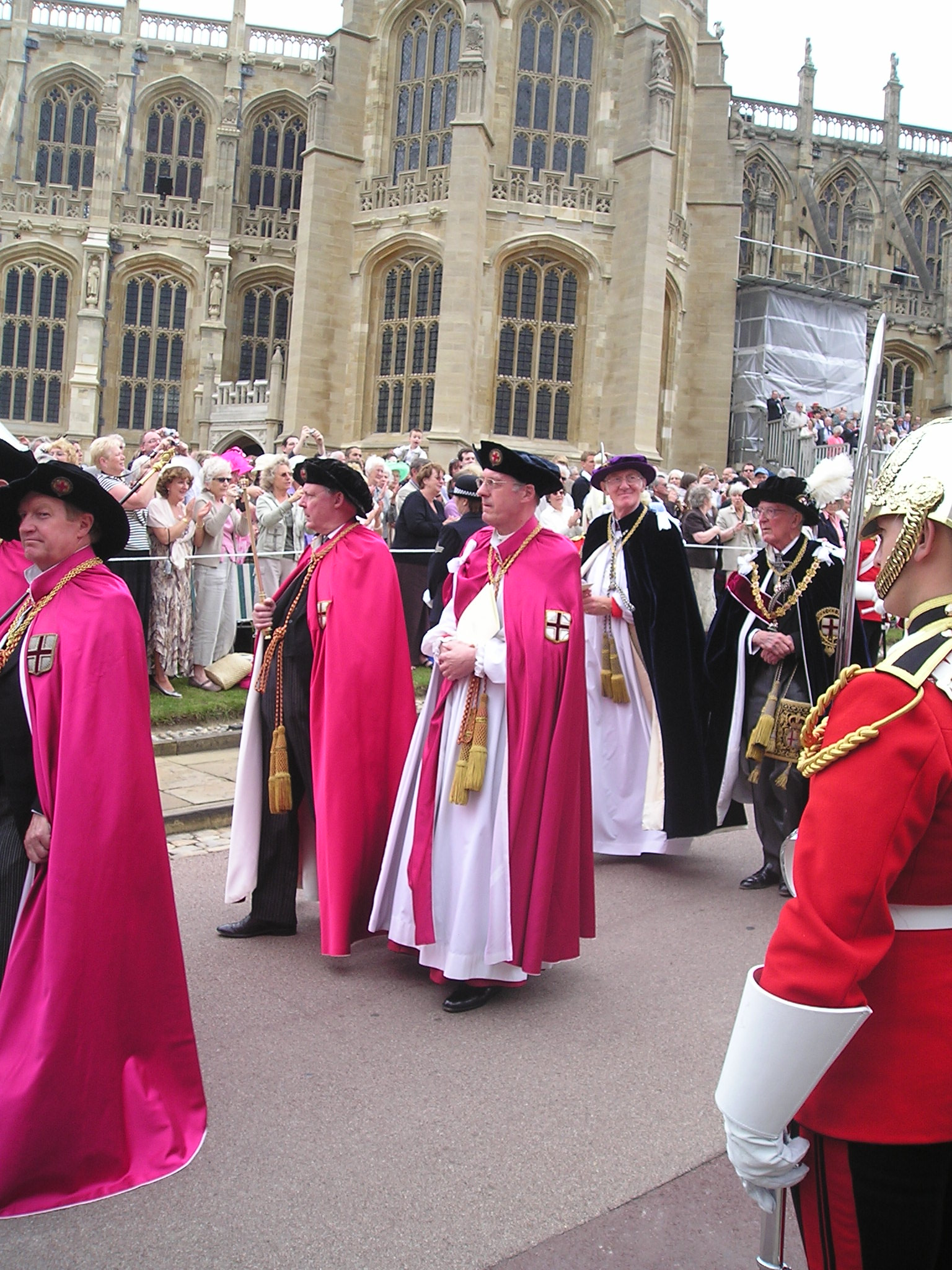
Officers of the Order of the Garter (left to right): Secretary (barely visible), Gentleman Usher of the Black Rod, Garter Principal King of Arms, Register, Prelate, Chancellor

== History of the office ==
When the Order of the Garter was founded in 1348 at St George's Chapel, Windsor Castle by King Edward III, three officers were initially appointed to serve them: the Prelate, the Register and the Usher. In 1477 Edward IV decreed that the further position of Chancellor should be created to be responsible for the seal and its use. Accommodation was to be provided in what came to be called the Chancellor's Tower. The position of Chancellor was to be second in seniority to the Prelate and was granted to Richard Beauchamp, Bishop of Salisbury, and his successors in that position. At that time Windsor Chapel lay geographically in the See of Salisbury, although as a royal chapel it did not come under the direct jurisdiction of the Bishop.

The unbroken succession of Bishops of Salisbury came to an end in 1551 when Sir William Cecil was made Chancellor by Edward VI, after which a succession of lay Chancellors were appointed.

Following a number of petitions by successive Bishops of Salisbury, their right to hold the position was conceded in 1669 and on the death of Henry de Vic the honour reverted to the Bishops of Salisbury.

In 1837 boundary changes made Windsor Castle fall in the diocese of Oxford and the Chancellorship was transferred to the Bishop of Oxford. A century later, the Bishop of Salisbury again challenged the loss of the office on the grounds that the Chancellorship had been attached to his office regardless of the diocese in which the chapel of the order lay and that, in any event, St George's Chapel, as a Royal Peculiar, was not under diocesan jurisdiction. The office of Chancellor was removed from the Bishop of Oxford (the outgoing bishop, Thomas Banks Strong, had been outspoken in the abdication crisis of Edward VIII), and withheld from his successors.

The office has since been held by one of the Knights and Ladies Companion. In 2024, The Baroness Manningham-Buller became the first female chancellor.

== Chancellors of the Order of the Garter ==
=== Bishops of Salisbury ===
- 1477–1481: Richard Beauchamp
- 1482–1484: Lionel Woodville
- 1485–1493: Thomas Langton
- 1493–1499: John Blyth
- 1500–1501: Henry Deane
- 1502–1524: Edmund Audley

=== Lay Chancellors ===
- 1551–1553: Sir William Cecil, Secretary of State
- 1553–1572: Sir William Petre, Secretary of State
- 1572–1577: Sir Thomas Smith, Secretary of State
- 1578–1587: Sir Francis Walsingham, Secretary of State
- 1587–1588: Sir Amias Paulet, Secretary of State
- 1589–1596: Sir John Wolley, Secretary for the Latin Tongue
- 1596–1607: Sir Edward Dyer
- 1607–1617: Sir John Herbert, Secretary of State
- 1617–1632: Sir George More
- 1632–1636: Sir Francis Crane
- 1637-1644: Sir Thomas Roe
- 1645–1658: Sir James Palmer
- 1658–1671: Sir Henry de Vic

=== Bishops of Salisbury ===
- 1671–1689: Seth Ward
- 1689–1715: Gilbert Burnet
- 1715–1721: William Talbot
- 1721–1723: Richard Willis
- 1723–1734: Benjamin Hoadly
- 1734–1748: Thomas Sherlock
- 1748–1757: John Gilbert
- 1757–1761: John Thomas
- 1761: The Hon Robert Hay Drummond
- 1761–1766: John Thomas
- 1766–1782: John Hume
- 1782–1791: Shute Barrington
- 1791–1807: John Douglas
- 1807–1825: John Fisher
- 1825–1837: Thomas Burgess

=== Bishops of Oxford ===
- 1837–1845: Richard Bagot
- 1845–1869: Samuel Wilberforce
- 1870–1889: John Mackarness
- 1889–1901: William Stubbs
- 1901–1911: Francis Paget
- 1911–1919: Charles Gore
- 1919–1925: Hubert Burge
- 1925–1937: Thomas Strong

=== Knights and Ladies Companion Chancellors ===
- 1937–1943: The Duke of Portland
- 1943–1959: The Earl of Halifax
- 1960–1972: The Marquess of Salisbury
- 1972–1977: The Viscount Cobham
- 1977–1994: The Marquess of Abergavenny
- 1994–2012: The Lord Carrington
- 2012–2024: The Duke of Abercorn
- 2024–present: The Baroness Manningham-Buller
