= Lawrence Booth =

Archbishop of York from 1476 to 1480

The Most Reverend and Right Honourable Lawrence Booth
- Archbishop of York and Primate of England
- Appointed: 1 September 1476
- Term ended: 19 May 1480
- Predecessor: George Neville
- Successor: Thomas Rotherham
- Other posts: Lord Chancellor and Keeper of the Great Seal
- Previous posts: Prince-Bishop of Durham; Dean of St Paul's

Orders
- Ordination: 1441
- Consecration: 25 September 1457

Personal details
- Born: c. 1420 Barton, Lancashire, England
- Died: 19 May 1480 (aged 60) Cawood Castle, Yorkshire
- Buried: Southwell Minster
- Denomination: Catholic
- Education: Pembroke Hall, Cambridge
- Coat of arms

Lawrence Booth (c. 1420 – 1480) served as bishop of Durham and lord chancellor of England, before being appointed archbishop of York.

== Life ==
The illegitimate son of John Booth, lord of the manor of Barton, near Eccles, Lancashire, he was half-brother of Sir Robert Booth of Dunham Massey, Cheshire.

Booth read civil and canon law at Cambridge, graduating as licentiate (Lic.C.L.), before receiving a Doctor of Divinity (D.D.). He was elected Master of Pembroke Hall in 1450, a post he held until his death, and also served as Chancellor of the University of Cambridge. Whilst at Cambridge, where he started a movement for both a School of Arts and a School of Civil Law, he is believed to have produced his first miracle, but cause for his beatification or canonization is yet to be introduced.

Outside Cambridge, Booth's career was helped by his half-brother William Booth, who was Bishop of Coventry and Lichfield (1447–1452) and Archbishop of York (1452–1464). In 1449, he was appointed a prebendary of St Paul's Cathedral and, on 2 November 1456, became Dean of St Paul's. He was also a prebendary of York Minster and of Lichfield Cathedral. From 1454 to 1457 he was Archdeacon of Richmond.

Booth's influence was not confined to the Church; he was also active in government. He was chancellor to Margaret of Anjou and, in about 1456, he became Keeper of the Privy Seal, and in that same year on 28 January he was also appointed one of the tutors and guardians of the Prince of Wales. He was Lord Privy Seal until 1460. In 1457 he also served briefly as Provost of Beverley Minster.

On 25 September 1457, Booth was installed as Prince-Bishop of Durham.

Although from a Lancastrian family, he cultivated relations with the Yorkists and, after the fall of Henry VI, Booth adapted himself to the new status quo. He submitted himself to King Edward (the former Earl of March) in April 1461, and by the end of June, Booth defeated a raid led by the Lords de Ros, Dacre and Rugemont-Grey who brought Henry VI over the border to try to raise a rebellion in the north of England. King Edward named him his confessor. Although he temporarily lost control of the palatinate of Durham, he was restored in 1464, after making a submission to Edward IV; he was successful in part by being a prelate who was never imprisoned in that era. He resumed activity in Edward's government thereafter being appointed, on 27 July 1473, Lord Chancellor, serving until May 1474. In October 1473 he led a delegation to Scotland to formally sign the marriage treaty between the newborn son (later James IV of Scotland) of James III and Edward's third daughter Cecily.

In 1476 Booth was translated to the see of York, previously held by his half-brother. He was the only prelate after King Edward IV's accession ever promoted to higher office.

Booth served as Archbishop of York until his death on 19 May 1480, and is buried beside William Booth, in the Collegiate Church of Southwell, which they both generously endowed.

== See also ==
- Booth baronets – Set index for Booth baronets
- York Minster – Grade I listed cathedral in England

== Citations ==
Political offices
Preceded by Thomas Lisieux	Lord Privy Seal; 1456–1460	Succeeded by Robert Stillington
Preceded by Robert Stillington	Lord Chancellor; 1473–1474	Succeeded by John Alcock
Catholic Church titles
Preceded by Robert Neville	Bishop of Durham; 1456–1476	Succeeded by William Dudley
Preceded by George Neville	Archbishop of York; 1476–1480	Succeeded by Thomas Rotherham
Academic offices
Preceded by Hugh Damlet	Master of Pembroke College, Cambridge; 1450–1480	Succeeded by Thomas Rotherham
Preceded by William Percy	Chancellor of the University of Cambridge; 1456–1458	Succeeded by William Wilflete
