= De Vic baronets =

Extinct baronetcy in the Baronetage of England

The de Vic Baronetcy, of Guernsey, was a title in the Baronetage of England. It was created on 3 September 1649 for Henry de Vic, Chancellor of the Order of the Garter. The title became extinct on the death of the second Baronet in 1688.

== de Vic baronets, of Guernsey (1649) ==
- Sir Henry de Vic, 1st Baronet (c. 1599–1671)
- Sir Charles de Vic, 2nd Baronet (died 1688)
