= Richard Steward =

English royalist churchman

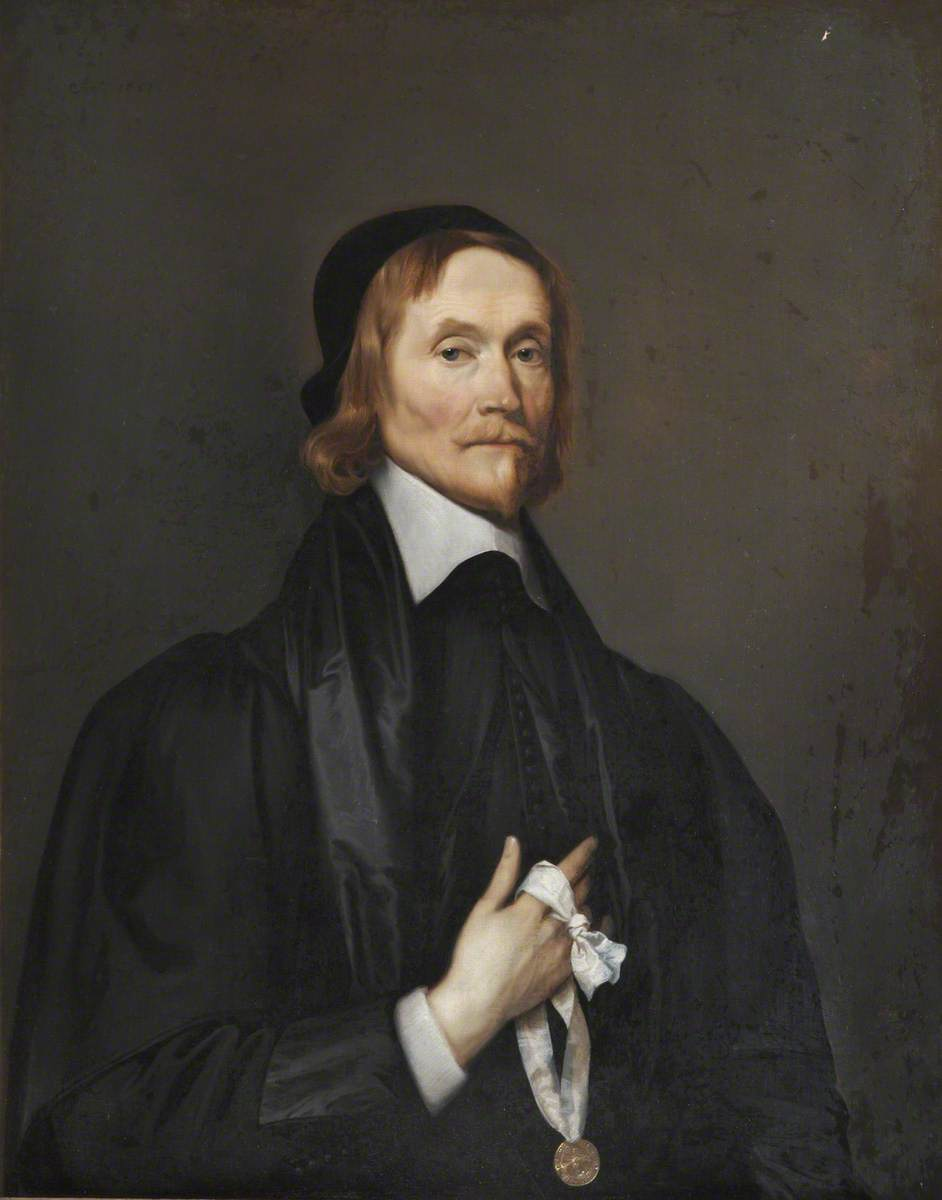
Richard Steward by Adriaen Hanneman

Richard Steward or Stewart (1593? – 1651) was an English royalist churchman, clerk of the closet to Charles I and designated Dean of St. Paul's and Westminster, though not able to take up his position because of the wartime circumstances.

== Life ==
He was baptised at Pateshull, Northamptonshire, on 3 August 1595, probably some two years after his birth. He was third son of Nicholas Steward, esq., of Pateshull. His mother's maiden name was Madox. From Westminster School he matriculated at Magdalen Hall, Oxford on 1 December 1609. He graduated B.A. in 1612, M.A. in 1615, B.C.L. in 1617, and D.C.L. on 3 July 1624. In 1613 he was elected fellow of All Souls' College, and in 1622 served in the office of proctor.

Having taken orders, he became rector of Harrietsham, Kent, in 1626, and on 17 July 1629 was named prebendary of Worcester. In the following year he also became vicar of Aldbourne in Wiltshire and rector of Mildenhall in Suffolk, and of Alton Barnes, Wiltshire. With the last benefice he also held a canonry at Salisbury. On 6 March 1635 he received in addition the deanery of Chichester. In 1638 he resigned his stall at Worcester on becoming prebendary of Westminster. He was made a chaplain in ordinary and clerk of the closet to Charles I in 1636, and two years later he received an annuity of £100 from the royal exchequer.

On 24 December 1639, on the nomination of the king, who dispensed with the statutory obligation requiring membership of the foundation, Steward became Provost of Eton College in succession to Sir Henry Wotton. In April of the following year he acted as prolocutor of convocation, working to obtain the vote of subsidies. He was rewarded by the nomination to the deanery of St. Paul's in 1641, but for some reason was not definitely appointed. On 15 March 1642 he was admitted to the prebend of St. Pancras, and in 1643 he was made Dean of the Chapel Royal. But in the same year he was dispossessed of the provostship of Eton by Parliament in favour of Francis Rous, and was subsequently deprived of his other preferments. The First English Civil War also prevented him from taking possession of the deanery of Westminster, to which he was nominated in 1645 on the expiry of Archbishop John Williams's commendam.

Steward was held in high favour by Charles I. In January 1645 he, together with five other divines, was sent by the king to the Treaty of Uxbridge, where he vigorously defended episcopacy, and treated the arguments for the presbyterian government in the Church of England by Alexander Henderson and Stephen Marshall as too diffuse. In August 1646 Charles I, writing from Newcastle, recommended Steward to the Prince of Wales and desired him to defer to his opinion in church affairs. From this time Steward seems to have followed the fortunes of Prince Charles. In 1649 he strongly opposed a clause in the proposed royal declaration drawn up by Edward Hyde. In the summer of 1650 he was in Jersey, in correspondence with Sir Edward Nicholas. In August he told Nicholas that he had been received into James, Duke of York's favour. He followed the Duke from Paris to Brussels, but returned to Paris in 1651, and John Evelyn heard him preach on 21 July.

Steward died at Paris on 14 November 1651. He was buried in the Protestant cemetery near Saint-Germain-des-Prés. He had married a daughter of Sir William Button of Tockenham, Wiltshire, and left two sons: Charles (1666–1735), and Knightley Steward (1673–1746), both of whom were beneficed clergymen.

== Works ==
Steward supplied Edward Hyde with some materials for his History of the Rebellion, particularly regarding the Uxbridge conference.

Steward published:

- 'Three Sermons,' 1656; reissued in 1658 with a fourth by Samuel Harsnett, and an 'Epistle to the Reader,' by T. H.
- 'Catholique Divinity; or the most solid and sententious expressions of the Primitive Doctors of the Church, with other Ecclesiastical and Civil Authors,' &c., 1657, (prefatory remarks by H. M.).
- 'Trias Sacra: a second ternary of Sermons,' 1659; reissued as 'Golden Remains, being the last and best Monuments that are likely to be made publick,' 1660.
- 'A Discourse of Episcopacy and Sacrilege,' 1683; originally printed in 1647 as an answer to a 'Letter to Dr. Samuel Turner' by John Fountaine.

'The Old Puritan detected and defeated,' 1689, is also attributed to him by the printer Sherlock; it was an attempt to prove that the fifty-fifth canon of James I did not favour extempore prayers.
