= John Sherwood (bishop) =

15th-century Bishop of Durham

- Bishop of Durham
- Appointed: 29 March 1484
- Term ended: 14 January 1494
- Predecessor: William Dudley
- Successor: Richard Foxe
- Previous post: Archdeacon of Richmond

Orders
- Consecration: probably 26 May 1484

Personal details
- Died: 14 January 1494 Rome
- Denomination: Catholic

John Sherwood (or Shirwood; died 1494) was an English churchman and diplomat.

== Life ==
Sherwood was the son of the common clerk John Shirwod of York and his first wife, Agnes. He graduated M.A. at University College, Oxford in 1450. He learned Greek from the scribe Emmanuel of Constantinople, in 1455; for which he was later commended in a letter from Richard III of England to Pope Innocent VIII. He was a papal lawyer, and then a diplomat, when he became the first permanent English ambassador, resident from 1479 in Rome. He built up a noted classical library, and gained the support of George Neville, Archbishop of York.

Sherwood was Archdeacon of Richmond in 1465 and later became Bishop of Durham, in 1484. He was nominated on 29 March 1484, with Richard III on the throne, and probably was consecrated on 26 May 1484. Despite knowing of the Princes in the Tower, through their physician, he did nothing for them. He visited Rome twice more as ambassador: in 1487, with Thomas Linacre and William Tilly of Selling; and in 1492–3, when he died there.

Sherwood died on 14 January 1494.

== Citations ==
Catholic Church titles
Preceded by William Dudley	Bishop of Durham; 1484–1494	Succeeded by Richard Foxe
