= John Morton (cardinal) =

English archbishop, administrator, and cardinal (c. 1420–1500)

His Eminence John Morton J.C.D., D.C.L.
- Cardinal, Archbishop of Canterbury; Primate of All England
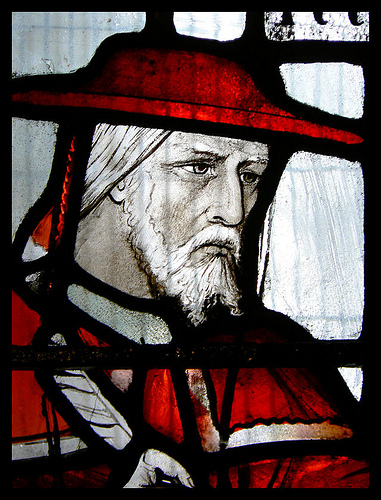
- Church: Catholic Church
- Appointed: 6 October 1486
- Term ended: 15 September 1500
- Predecessor: Thomas Bourchier
- Successor: Thomas Langton (as bishop-elect), Henry Deane as true Archbishop
- Previous posts: Bishop of Ely, 1479–1486

Orders
- Consecration: 31 January 1479 by Thomas Bourchier
- Created cardinal: 20 September 1493 by Alexander VI
- Rank: Cardinal priest of Santa Anastasia

Personal details
- Born: c. 1420 Dorset, England
- Died: 15 September 1500 (aged approximately 79/80) Knole House, near Sevenoaks, Kent, England
- Buried: Crypt of Canterbury Cathedral
- Education: Probably Peckwater Inn at Oxford rather than Balliol College
- Coat of arms

John Morton (c. 1420 – 15 September 1500) was an English cleric, civil lawyer and administrator during the period of the Wars of the Roses. He entered royal service under Henry VI and was a trusted councillor under Edward IV and Henry VII. Edward IV made him Bishop of Ely and under Henry VII he became Lord Chancellor, Archbishop of Canterbury and a cardinal.

== Early life ==
Morton was born in around 1420 either in Milborne St Andrew or Bere Regis in Dorset. He came from the minor gentry of the time: his father was Richard Morton of Milborne St Andrew and his uncle, William Morton of Cerne, represented Shaftesbury in Parliament in 1437. Morton was educated at the University of Oxford, becoming a Bachelor of Civil Law in 1448, a Bachelor of Civil and Canon Law in 1451 and a Doctor of Civil Law in 1452. He practised as a proctor in the chancellor's court at Oxford from 1448 and in 1451 he was acting as a commissary or deputy and official of the chancellor of the university. In 1452 he became principal of the civil law school and in 1453 he became the principal of Peckwater Inn where he had previously been a fellow. Later in life, Morton was elected as Chancellor of the University of Oxford for life in 1495 and as Chancellor of the University of Cambridge in 1499.

Morton also practised as an advocate in the Court of Arches, the ecclesiastical court of the Province of Canterbury. As a result of his work as a civil lawyer Morton came to the notice of Thomas Bourchier, who became Archbishop of Canterbury in 1454, and on 26 September 1456 he entered royal service, being appointed as chancellor of the infant Edward, Prince of Wales.

Morton was ordained as an acolyte and subdeacon on 17 December 1457, as a deacon on 17 February 1458 and as a priest on 10 March 1458. He had already obtained his first benefices, as rector of Shellingford in Berkshire (23 January 1453) and rector of Maiden Newton in Dorset (21 March 1457). In 1458 he was granted a papal dispensation to hold three benefices at the same time. In May 1458 he was made a subdean and prebend of Lincoln Cathedral, in November 1458 a prebend of Salisbury, and by 1461 he was also rector of Bloxworth in Dorset and archdeacon of Norwich.

In 1459 the Duke of York, the Earl of Salisbury, and Salisbury's eldest son, the Earl of Warwick, rose in rebellion against Henry VI but they fled after the Rout of Ludford Bridge. Morton was one of a number of lawyers involved in drawing up the act of attainder against the Yorkist lords passed by the parliament which met in Coventry in November 1459. After the defeat of the Lancastrian forces at the Battle of Towton on 29 March 1461, Morton was captured at Cockermouth along with the Earl of Wiltshire. They were brought to Edward IV in Newcastle where Wiltshire was beheaded while Morton was sent to the Tower of London.

Morton was included in the act of attainder passed by Edward IV's first parliament in November 1461 and he lost all the benefices which he had accumulated. However, he escaped and joined Queen Margaret of Anjou in France, being appointed Keeper of the Privy Seal to Henry VI and assisting in the negotiations leading to the Treaty of Tours on 28 June 1462. He accompanied the queen when, with French and Scottish support, she made incursions into Northumberland in 1462 and 1463. After these attempts to restore Henry VI failed, Morton returned to France with the queen and shared the exile of the small Lancastrian court at the Chateau of Koeur near Saint-Mihiel in Lorraine. In 1469 he was admitted to study theology at the University of Louvain.

== Service under Edward IV ==
Following the final defeat of the Lancastrian cause at the Battle of Tewkesbury on 4 May 1471, Morton was granted a pardon by Edward IV and resumed his career in royal service. By 29 September 1471 (Michaelmas) he was appointed as a Master in Chancery and on 16 March 1472 he was granted the office of Master of the Rolls. Besides being the keeper of the rolls of the Chancery, the parchment rolls which formed the official records of the government of England, the Master of the Rolls was by this time a judicial official, second only to the Lord Chancellor in the Court of Chancery. He also acted as the keeper of the Great Seal during a vacancy in the office of Lord Chancellor or during the Lord Chancellor's temporary absence.

Morton began to accumulate more benefices, being made Rector of St Dunstan-in-the-East in London in 1472 (exchanged in 1474 for appointments as Rector of South Molton in Devon and master of St Bartholomew's Hospital in Bristol), a prebend of St Paul's in London in 1473, archdeacon of Chester (1474), Winchester (1475), Huntingdon (1475), Berkshire (1476), Norfolk (1477) and Leicester (1478) and a prebend of Wells (1476), York (1476) and Exeter (1476).

Civil lawyers were also in demand for diplomatic missions and Morton left England in early January 1474 together with Lord Duras on an embassy to Burgundy. He did not return until early June. In December 1474 he was despatched on another embassy to Burgundy along with Sir Thomas Montgomery and the king's secretary, William Hatclyf. They were also commissioned to seek alliances against France with the Holy Roman Emperor, Frederick III, and Matthias Corvinus, King of Hungary. After Edward IV invaded France in the middle of 1475, Morton was involved in negotiating the Treaty of Picquigny (29 August 1475) by which Louis XI undertook to pay Edward IV 75,000 crowns within fifteen days, and 50,000 crowns yearly thereafter as long as they both lived, in exchange for the withdrawal of the English army. Along with other members of the English court, Morton was rewarded by Louis XI with an annual pension, in his case of 600 crowns.

On 16 February 1477 Edward IV sent Morton and Sir John Donne as ambassadors to Louis XI to seek the extension of the truce under the Treaty of Picquigny. When Louis XI sent ambassadors to England in July 1477 to continue negotiations, Morton was one of those appointed to meet them. By a treaty made on 21 July 1477 the truce was extended for the lives of the kings and for a year after the death of whichever of them died first. On 21 January 1479 Edward IV instructed Morton and others to begin negotiations with the French ambassador, Charles de Martigny, Bishop of Elne, with a view to extending the truce between the two nations to last for one hundred and one years and to pay the pension of 50,000 crowns yearly throughout that period to Edward and his successors. In February 1479 the bishop signed agreements to that effect drawn up by Morton.

In the meanwhile, Morton had been consecrated by Archbishop Bourchier as Bishop of Ely in the chapel at Lambeth on 31 January 1479 and he vacated the other ecclesiastical offices which he had accumulated. It was during this period that Morton was mentioned by the visiting Italian observer, Dominic Mancini, as being, along with Archbishop Thomas Rotherham and William, Lord Hastings, "of no small influence" with the king. Mancini wrote that "these men being in age mature, and instructed by long experience of public affairs, helped more than other councillors to form the king's policy, and besides carried it out".

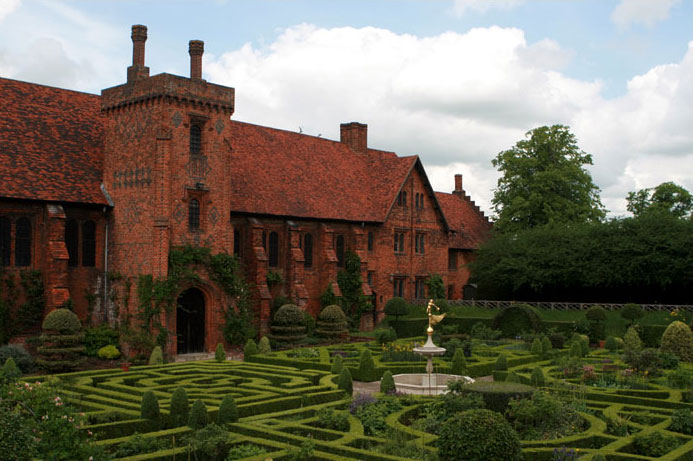
The Old Palace at Hatfield House, Hertfordshire

As Bishop of Ely, Morton initiated various building works, including rebuilding the Bishop's Palace at Hatfield in Hertfordshire which had been in the possession of the Bishops of Ely since 1109. Morton rebuilt it in about 1480 as a stately manor house, all in brick. He was also responsible for the construction of Morton's Leam, a cut or ditch twelve miles in length, forty feet broad and four feet deep, from Stanground near Peterborough to Guyhirn, by which water was channelled from the River Nene to Wisbech. Morton had a tower built to monitor the works.

== Exile under Richard III ==
Edward IV died unexpectedly on 9 April 1483 and Morton was involved in making arrangements for the coronation of his elder son as Edward V. However, on 13 June he was arrested at a council meeting along with Lord Hastings and Archbishop Rotherham. They were accused of treason by the king's uncle, Richard, Duke of Gloucester, and Hastings was beheaded. Morton and Rotherham were imprisoned in the Tower of London. Gloucester was crowned as Richard III on 6 July 1483. Rotherham was soon restored to favour but Morton was committed to the custody of Henry Stafford, Duke of Buckingham, who sent him to his castle in Wales, Brecon Castle. Morton was involved in the failed uprising known as Buckingham's rebellion but he subsequently escaped to Flanders from where he continued to coordinate opposition to Richard III. In particular, when Richard III was seeking the return of Henry Tudor, Earl of Richmond, from Brittany, Morton sent Christopher Urswick to alert him, and Henry was able to escape over the border into France.

Morton was included in the Acts of Attainder passed by Richard III's first (and only) parliament which met at Westminster in January 1484 and he once again lost all his temporal possessions. He was granted an unsolicited pardon on 11 December 1484 but he nevertheless refused to return to England. He is known to have been in Rome by 31 January 1485, when he signed the register of the Santo Spirito fraternity, and he was still there in April, when he secured a papal brief for the reform of Peterhouse, and probably on 7 May, when a papal indulgence was secured, the proceeds of which were to go to the repair of the dykes of the Isle of Ely and Ely Cathedral, damaged in recent floods. His real mission, however, may have been to secure papal dispensation for Richmond's intended marriage to Edward IV's eldest daughter, Elizabeth of York, which was necessary because both were descended from John of Gaunt.

== Service under Henry VII ==
Henry VII summoned Morton back to England immediately after his victory at the Battle of Bosworth and he was probably present at Henry's coronation at Westminster on 30 October 1485. On 6 March 1486 he was made Lord Chancellor. This was a judicial office, presiding over the equitable jurisdiction of the Court of Chancery which continued to expand during his tenure. He was Henry VII's most trusted adviser, being present at nearly every meeting of the king's council for which records survive. The overall direction of policy in domestic and international affairs remained in the king's hands, advised by his councillors, but Morton and other royal clerks carried out the administrative work of putting his decisions into effect.

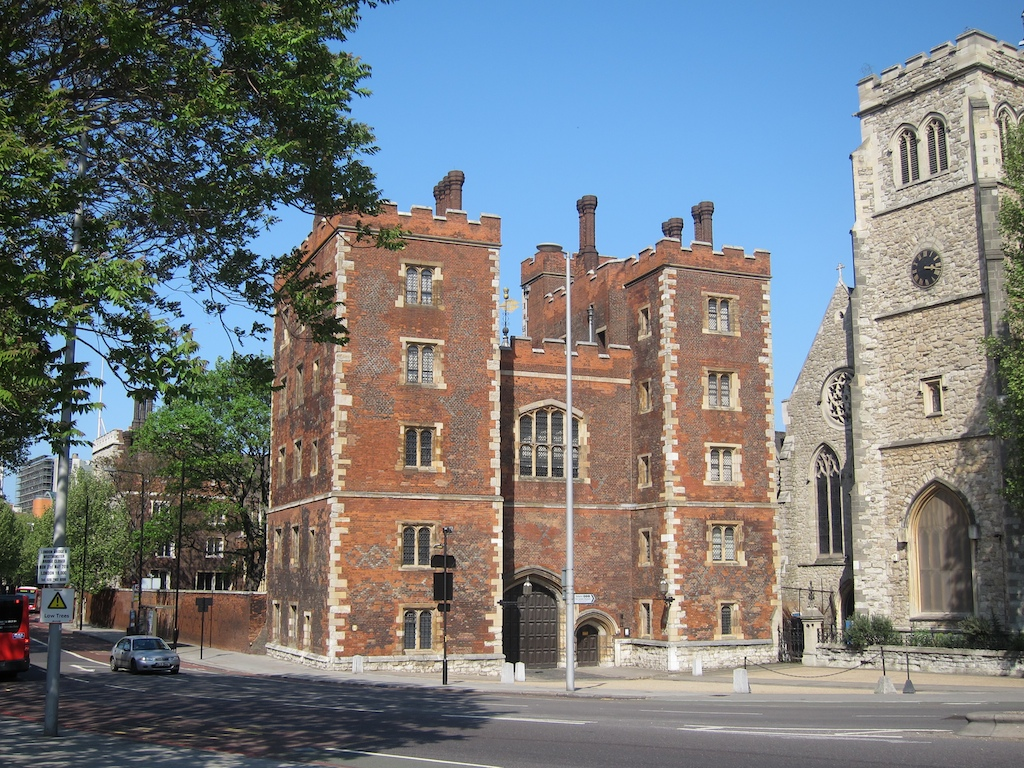
Morton's Tower, the entrance to Lambeth Palace

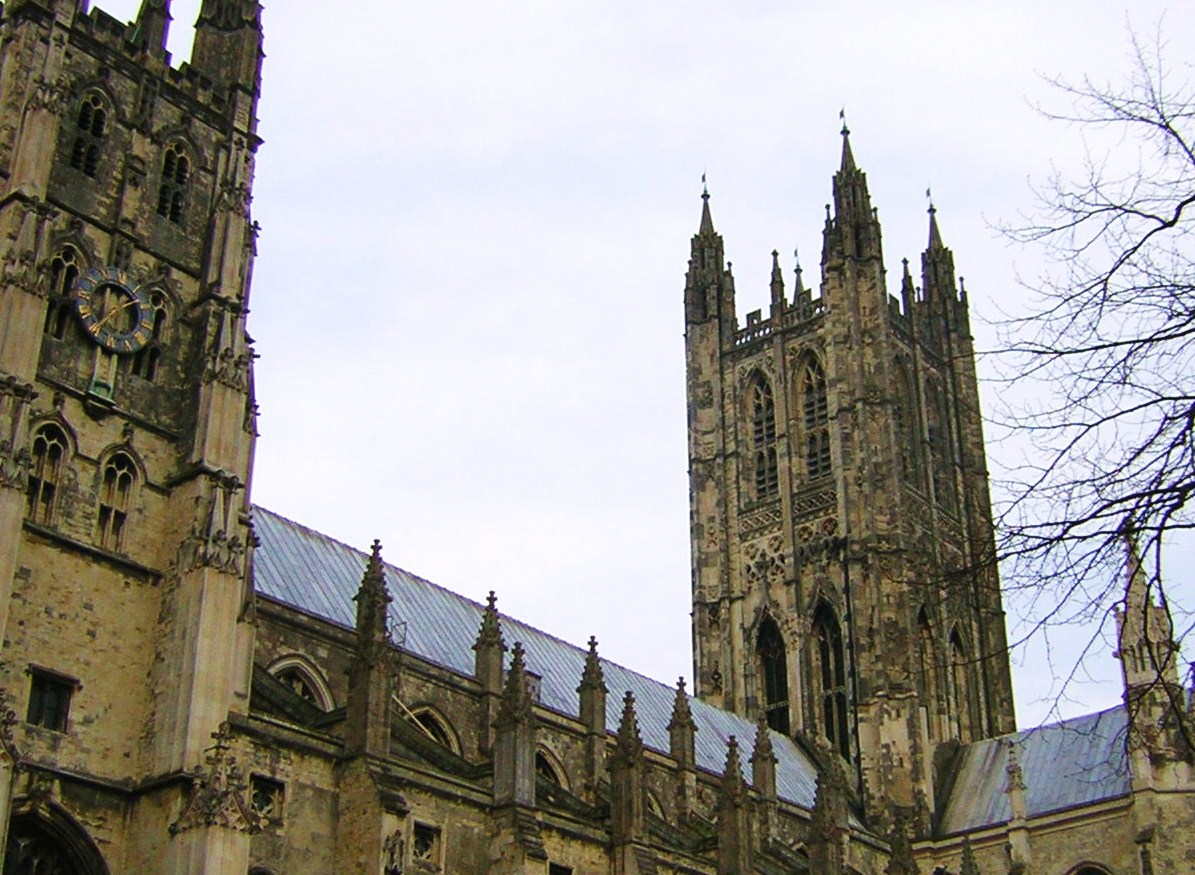
Bell Harry Tower, Canterbury Cathedral

In the seventeenth century Francis Bacon attributed to Morton the device known as Morton's fork, whereby those who were lavish in their manner of living were told by the tax commissioners that they could obviously afford to give more to the king while those who were frugal were likewise told that they should contribute more because they must have put aside savings. However, this was Bacon's invention. It is true that the king's councillors, in particular Morton and Reginald Bray, were blamed by the Cornish rebels in 1497 for the level of taxation, but it was only after the deaths of Morton in 1500 and Bray in 1503 that Henry's financial exactions, in particular his imposition of bonds on many of his subjects and his exploitation of his prerogative rights, became more burdensome. The historian Polydore Vergil wrote that Morton and Bray were the two councillors who could reprove Henry VII when necessary and that it became obvious after their deaths that they had been responsible, not for aggravating royal harshness, but for restraining it.

Cardinal Bourchier died at Knole on 30 March 1486 and Henry VII prevailed upon the monks of Canterbury to elect Morton as his successor as Archbishop of Canterbury. The pope signified his agreement to this appointment by a bull dated 6 October and Morton was enthroned on 21 January 1487. After much pressure from Henry VII, he was made a cardinal on 20 September 1493. With the support of the papacy, Morton pursued reform of religious houses such as the Abbey of St Albans and the Cluniac house of St Andrew's, Northampton. He was not accused of personal aggrandisement but he sought to defend the traditional prerogatives of the Archbishop of Canterbury and he defended the jurisdiction of the archbishop's courts over wills where the testator had substantial goods in more than one diocese.

In 1489, Morton stood as godfather to the king's eldest daughter, Princess Margaret, to whom Morton gave two gilt flagons and a holy water basin with a gold bejeweled aspergillum as christening gifts.

As he had done when he was Bishop of Ely, Morton engaged in various building works while he was Archbishop of Canterbury. Cardinal Bourchier had left the manor of Knole to the see of Canterbury in 1480 and Morton carried out repairs and improvements of what was to be one of his favourite residences as archbishop. At Lambeth Palace, which was his principal residence, he built the brick gatehouse, called Morton's Tower. He also rebuilt or added to his residences at Croydon, Maidstone, Charing, Ford (near Reculver), Allington (modern Aldington) and the palace at Canterbury. Morton's crowning achievement as archbishop in terms of building works was the completion of the central crossing tower of Canterbury Cathedral, known as Bell Harry Tower. This was initially built as a simple lantern tower, like that at York, but in around 1494 it was decided to add an extra fifty feet to the tower and the exterior stonework bears Morton's rebus – a falcon or 'mort' perched on a cask or 'tun' – as evidence of his involvement.

== Morton's legacy ==
Morton died at Knole on 15 September 1500. A London chronicler said that he was:

a man worthi of memory for his many greate Actes and specially for his greate wisdom, which contynued to the tyme of his Discease, passyng the yeres of iiij^{xx} and odde; in our tyme was no man lyke to be compared w^{t} him in all thynges; Albeit that he lyved not w^{t}oute the greate Disdayn and greate haterede of the Comons of this land

The mention of the hatred of the commons was perhaps a reference to the fact that, as mentioned above in relation to the Cornish rebellion, he was blamed for the heavy burden of taxation. The Spanish ambassador, De Puebla, wrote on 27 December 1500 that "the Cardinal of England is dead, and has left no statesman behind who can be compared to him". John Haryngton, the proctor of the English Cistercians, and therefore an opponent of Morton's attempt to extend his jurisdiction to include exempt religious houses, including the Cistercians, said that he saw in him "nothing but the qualities of a good judge" and that in his opinion he was:

a man of great learning and profound wisdom, devoted to the service of God, concerned for the public welfare rather than for his own advantage, immersing himself profitably in both religious and secular affairs, and not shrinking from the heat and burden of the day.

Morton left money in his will to pay for the maintenance of twenty poor scholars at Oxford University and ten poor scholars at Cambridge University for twenty years. He made provision for masses to be said for the salvation of his soul for twenty years and he left 1,000 marks to be distributed as alms for the poor. His closeness to the royal family is demonstrated by the bequests of his best portable breviary to Henry VII, his best psalter to the queen, an image of the Blessed Virgin in gold to the king's mother, Lady Margaret Beaufort, and a gold goblet and £40 to the king's eldest daughter, Princess Margaret, whom he described as his "beloved god-daughter". In addition, he left a year's wages to his lay servants. He died in possession of extensive estates which were mainly left to his relatives but he left lands in the park of Mote, near Maidstone, and the mill adjacent to this park, to the cathedral of Canterbury.

Morton asked that he be buried under a plain marble slab before the statue of the Virgin known as Our Lady of Undercroft in Canterbury Cathedral. After the pavement became cracked and broken, parts of his body were taken away and his skull is now in the keeping of Stonyhurst College.

The books that are known to have belonged to Morton are mainly works of canon and civil law although they include Seneca's letters and works on oratory and rhetoric. Giovanni Gigli, a humanist and papal collector, dedicated to him a short tract on the canonization of saints. A chaplain in his household, Henry Medwall, wrote the first play to be printed in English, Fulgens and Lucrece, which may have been performed before the members of the court at Lambeth in 1497. In 1500 Morton financed the printing by Richard Pynson of the Salisbury or Sarum missal. This was the second edition of the Sarum missal to have been printed in England and it includes the first music printed in England.

Sir Thomas More served as a page in Morton's household between the ages of 12 and 14, that is, from around 1490 to 1492, and he included a pen portrait of Morton in his Utopia. Almost a century after Morton's death a theory arose that he had actually written More's History of King Richard III but More's authorship of this work is not now questioned. Morton may have been one of More's sources of information for the History but More had access to many sources, both oral and written, and he invented many details himself.

== Armorials ==
Arms of Morton: Quarterly 1st & 4th: Gules, a goat's head erased argent armed or; 2nd & 3rd: Ermine

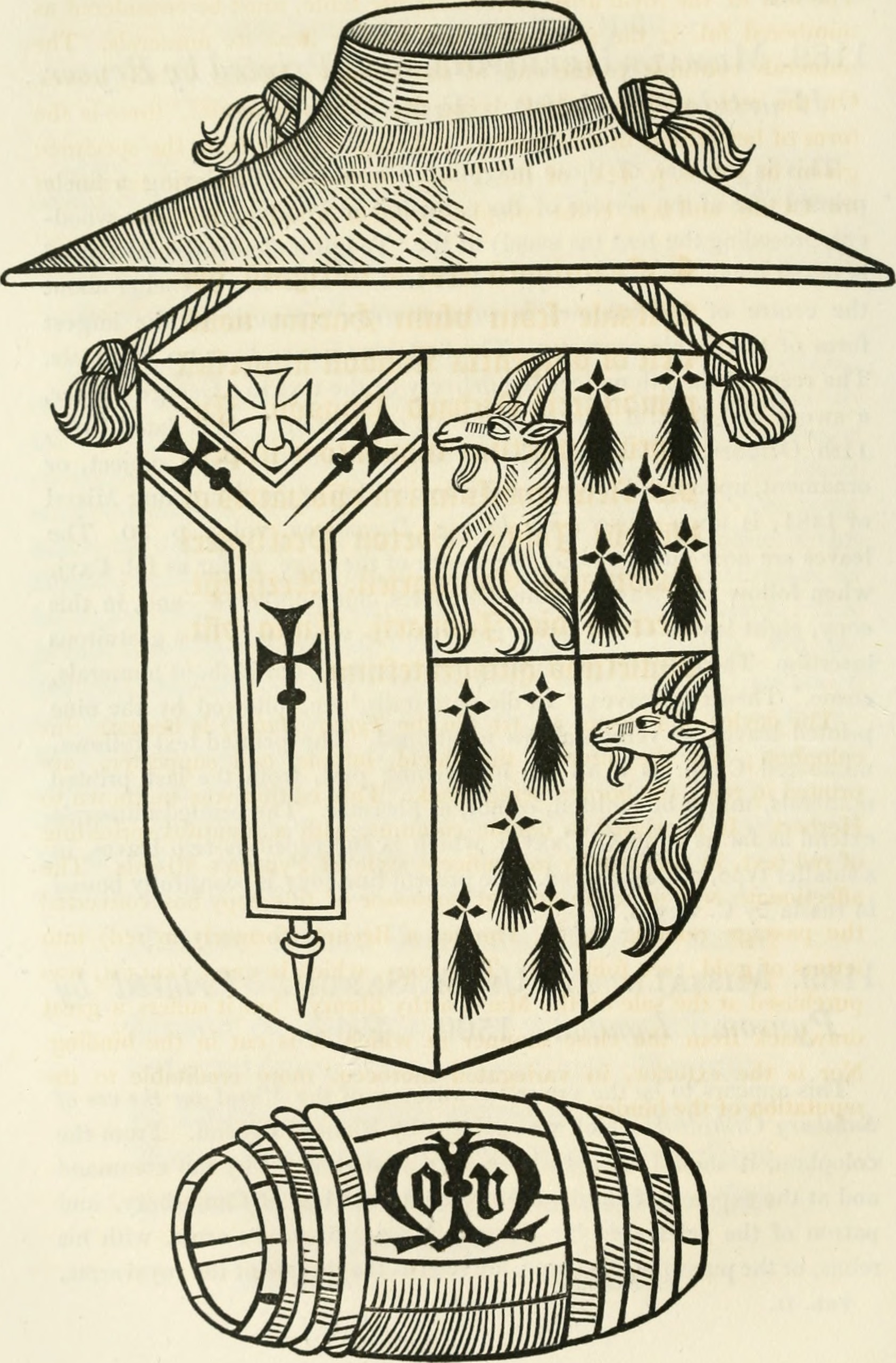
The arms of Archbishop Morton as printed by Richard Pynson

James Bentham wrote in 1771 concerning the arms of Bishop Morton:

"The Arms given him in Anglia Sacra, p. 673, are not sufficiently explicit; they should be thus blasoned: Quarterly gules and ermine on the 1st and 4th a goat's head erased argent. And this agrees with his arms carved various times on the noble Tower of Wisbeche Church, and as they were formerly in a window of Linton Church in Cambridgeshire, as I have it in a manuscript of church notes taken above a century ago. However these accord not with those for our bishop in his own cathedral twice, viz. in the east window of the north aisle of the presbytery, and in another window of the same aisle, where they are still remaining, and are thus blasoned: Quarterly gules and ermine, on the 1st and 4th three goat's heads erased argent, attired or.

== In popular culture ==
In the 1972 BBC television series The Shadow of the Tower, which focused on the reign of Henry VII, Morton was played by Denis Carey. In the Netflix/Canal series Borgia, Morton appears in one scene in season 2, episode 4, and is portrayed by David Gant. In the Starz miniseries The White Princess, Morton is portrayed by Kenneth Cranham.

== Citations ==
Political offices
Preceded by John Alcock	Lord Chancellor; 1487–1500	Succeeded by Henry Deane (Keeper of the Great Seal)
Catholic Church titles
Preceded by William Grey	Bishop of Ely; 1478–1486	Succeeded by John Alcock
Preceded by Thomas Bourchier	Archbishop of Canterbury; 1486–1500	Succeeded by Thomas Langton
Preceded by Antonio Pallavicini Gentili	Cardinal priest of Santa Anastasia; 1493–1500	Succeeded by Antonio Trivulzio
Academic offices
Preceded by John Russell	Chancellor of the University of Oxford; 1494–1500	Succeeded by William Smyth
