= William Rawlinson (Commissioner) =

English serjeant-at-law

Sir William Rawlinson (1640–1703) was an English serjeant-at-law and Commissioner for the Great Seal of the Realm between 1688 and 1693.

== Early life ==
Rawlinson was the second son of William Rawlinson, of Graithwaite and Rusland Hall, Lancashire, and was born at Graithwaite on 16 June 1640. His father had captained in a troop of parliamentary volunteers during the civil war, serving at Marston Moor and Ribble Bridge. His mother was Elizabeth Sawrey, daughter of Anthony Sawrey of Plumpton. He was educated at Hawkshead School and was admitted at Christ's College, Cambridge, on 13 April 1655, aged 15. He was admitted at Gray's Inn on 20 February 1657, and in 1667 was called to the bar.

== Career ==
Rawlinson became a chancery lawyer. In Easter term 1686 he became a serjeant-at-law, and in 1688 at the revolution he was appointed one of the three Commissioners for the Great Seal. He helped to draft the amendments to the act which authorised the commissioners to execute the office of Lord Chancellor in March 1689 He was knighted by King William III at Hampton Court on 5 March 1689. In November 1690 he gave evidence before the House of Lords against the bill to reform the abuses of the court of chancery, and was allowed a chair in view of his infirmities. Rawlinson acted as commissioner of the seal for three years, but in March 1693 Sir John Somers became sole keeper. Somers also opposed the king's proposal to appoint Rawlinson chief Baron of the Exchequer to replace Sir Robert Atkyns, arguing that he was ignorant of common law.

Rawlinson returned to the bar, and in October 1697 he was as serjeant pleading for the Duke of Devonshire. In 1695 Godolphin tried again to secure him promotion but without success.

== Later life and legacy ==
Rawlinson died on 11 May 1703 at Hendon, where he had purchased an old mansion, Whichcotes, in Brent Street. He was buried in Hendon church where there is a monument to his memory, with a long Latin inscription.

== Family ==
Rawlinson was married twice. By his first wife he had two daughters, Elizabeth and Ann. Elizabeth married Gyles Earle and was the mother of William Rawlinson Earle and Ann married John Aislabie and was the mother of William Aislabie. His second wife was Jane Noseworthy, daughter of Edward Noseworthy of Devon, and his wife Honora Maynard, who was a daughter of Sir John Maynard (1602–1690). Their only child died in infancy. Jane died in 1712, leaving £500 to establish a school for girls. She was buried in Ealing church, where a monument was erected.
