= William Ayscough =

15th-century Bishop of Salisbury

- Bishop of Salisbury
- Appointed: 11 February 1438
- Term ended: 29 June 1450
- Predecessor: Robert Neville
- Successor: Richard Beauchamp

Orders
- Consecration: 20 July 1438

Personal details
- Died: 29 June 1450 Edington
- Denomination: Roman Catholic

William Ayscough or Aiscough (c. 1395 – 29 June 1450) was a medieval English cleric who served as Bishop of Salisbury from 1438 until his death.

Ayscough was nominated on 11 February 1438 and consecrated on 20 July 1438. He was a royal confessor and a regular member of the royal council.

Ayscough was killed at Edington, Wiltshire, on 29 June 1450 during Jack Cade's Rebellion after being seized by a mob whilst saying mass at the local church. He was led up an adjacent hill where he was brutally murdered. The perpetrators were from across the county of Wiltshire and the surrounding area, however men from the city of Salisbury - one of largest English cities in the late medieval period - were particularly prominent in the murder, with several sources suggesting a beer brewer from the city was the ringleader of the mob that seized Ayscough.

Various reasons for his murder have been posited. His closeness to the King, as royal confessor, associated him with the military failures and government mismanagement during the reign of Henry VI. However, the prominence of Salisbury citizens during the murder also suggest that local issues were a chief cause - with Asycough, as the diocese's bishop, restricting ancient trading rights and liberties in Salisbury whilst exacting burdensome dues. This had a negative financial impact on the city's artisan class and the county of Wiltshire which suffered periods of poverty and unrest during the 15th century.

Ayscough officiated at the marriage of Henry VI and his wife, Margaret of Anjou, at Titchfield Abbey in 1445.

== Citations ==
Catholic Church titles
Preceded by Robert Neville	Bishop of Salisbury; 1438–1450	Succeeded by Richard Beauchamp
