= Richard Beauchamp (bishop) =

15th-century Bishop of Hereford and Bishop of Salisbury

- Bishop of Salisbury
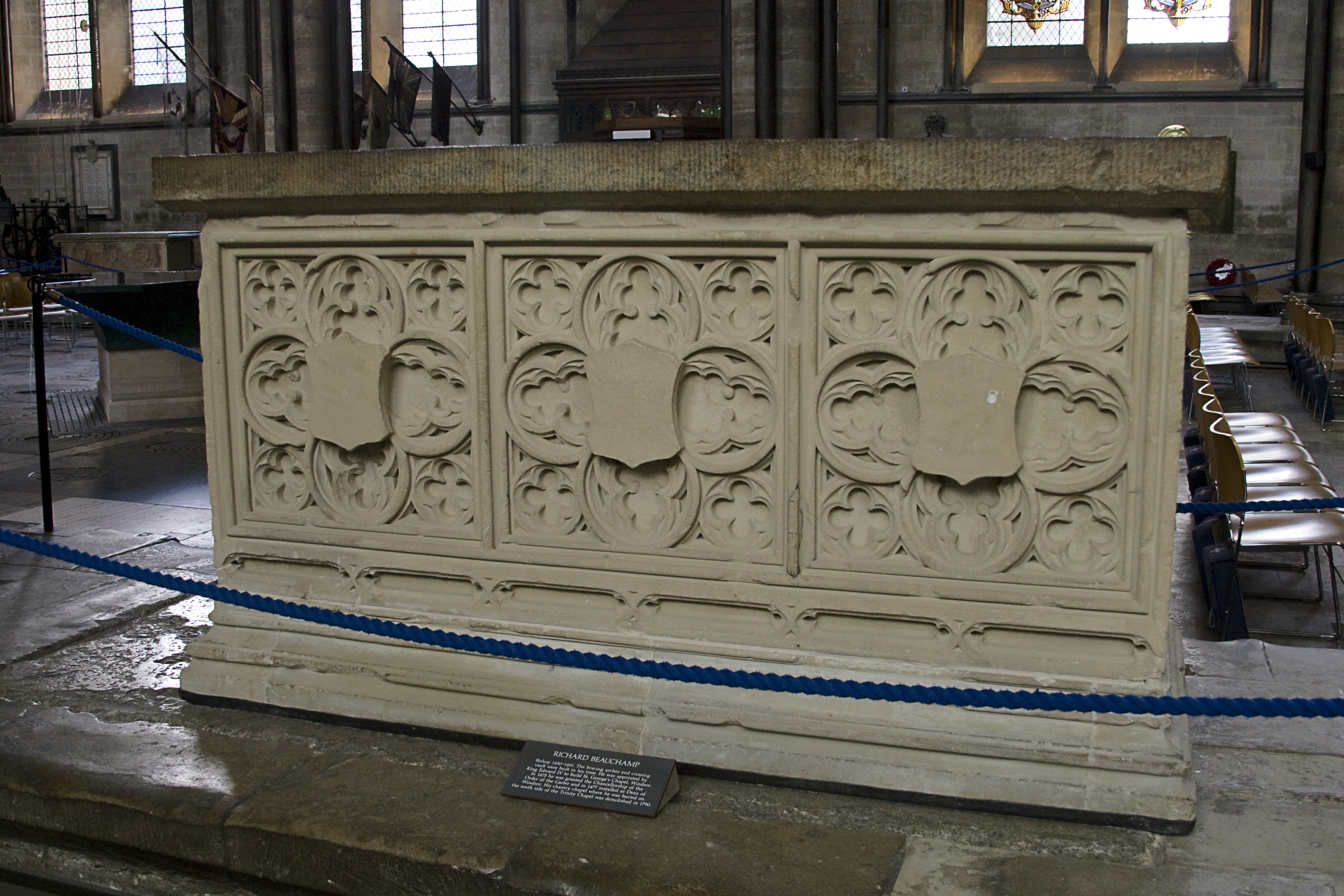
- Beauchamp's tomb in Salisbury Cathedral
- Appointed: 14 August 1450
- Term ended: 18 October 1481
- Predecessor: William Ayscough
- Successor: Lionel Woodville
- Previous post: Bishop of Hereford

Orders
- Consecration: 9 February 1449

Personal details
- Died: 18 October 1481
- Denomination: Catholic

Richard Beauchamp (died 1481) was a medieval Bishop of Hereford and Bishop of Salisbury.

Beauchamp was the son of Walter Beauchamp, Speaker of the House of Commons of England in 1416, and studied at Oxford.

After serving as Archdeacon of Suffolk from around 1441, Beauchamp was nominated to the see of Hereford on 4 December 1448 and consecrated as bishop on 9 February 1449.

Beauchamp was translated to the see of Salisbury on 14 August 1450 and in 1477 the new office of Chancellor of the Order of the Garter was granted to him and his successors.

Beauchamp died on 18 October 1481 and was entombed in an elaborate gothic chantry chapel outside the east end of the cathedral. When this was demolished in the 18th century his remains were taken inside the cathedral.

Richard Beauchamp and his family feature in a Channel 4 Time Team programme about Salisbury Cathedral, which was first broadcast on 8 February 2009.

== Citations ==
Catholic Church titles
Preceded by Thomas Spofford	Bishop of Hereford; 1448–1450	Succeeded by Reginald Boulers
Preceded by William Ayscough	Bishop of Salisbury; 1450–1481	Succeeded by Lionel Woodville
