= Henry de Vic =

Courtier

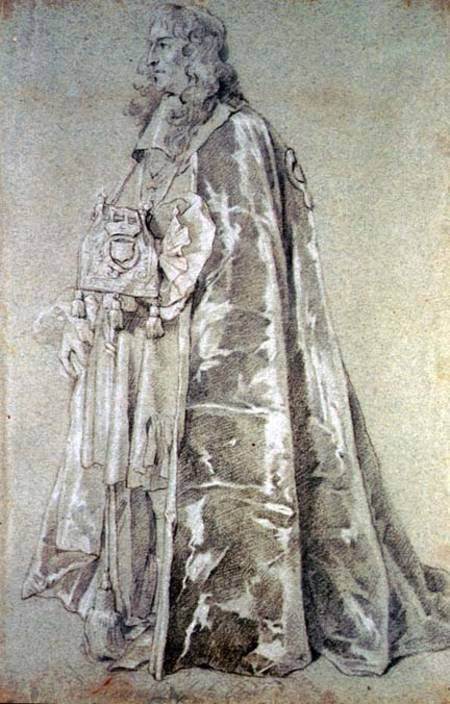
Sir Henry de Vic by Sir Peter Lely

Sir Henry de Vic, 1st Baronet (c. 1599 – 20 November 1671) was a Guernsey-born courtier.

== Early life ==
He was born the son of John de Vic of Guernsey and educated at Westminster School and Christ Church, Oxford, where he was awarded a BA in 1619.

== Career ==
He lived in Brussels for 20 years where he was the representative of Charles II. Whilst there he had a romantic affair with Lucy Walter, the past mistress of Charles II. He was created a baronet in 1649. In 1660 he was appointed Secretary for the French Tongue and Chancellor of the Order of the Garter. In 1662 he became controller of the household to the Duke of York. The same year he was elected a Fellow of the Royal Society.

== Death ==
On his death in 1671 he was buried in the transept of Westminster Abbey. His gravestone, no longer readable, once read "Here lys the mortall part of Sr Henry De Vic, Baronet and Chancellor of the noble order of the Garter. He departed this life 20 of Novemb. 1671. He was married to Margaret Carterett, the daughter of Sr Philip Carterett of the Isle of Jerseye. By whome he had Charles De Vic, Baronett, and Anne-Charlotte De Vic married to John Lord Fresheville, Baron of Staveley in the county of Derby, who caused this stone to be layde to the memory of her deare father."

== Personal life ==
He married Margaret Carteret, the daughter of Sir Philip Carteret of Saint Ouen, Jersey and sister of Sir Philip Carteret, 1st Baronet. They had two children.

Henry was succeeded by his son Sir Charles de Vic, who died unmarried, whereby the baronetcy became extinct. Their daughter Anna Charlotte married John Frescheville, 1st Baron Frescheville, as his third wife.

Baronetage of England
New creation	Baronet (of Guernsey); 1649–1671	Succeeded by Charles de Vic
