= William Dudley (bishop) =

15th-century Bishop of Durham

- Bishop of Durham
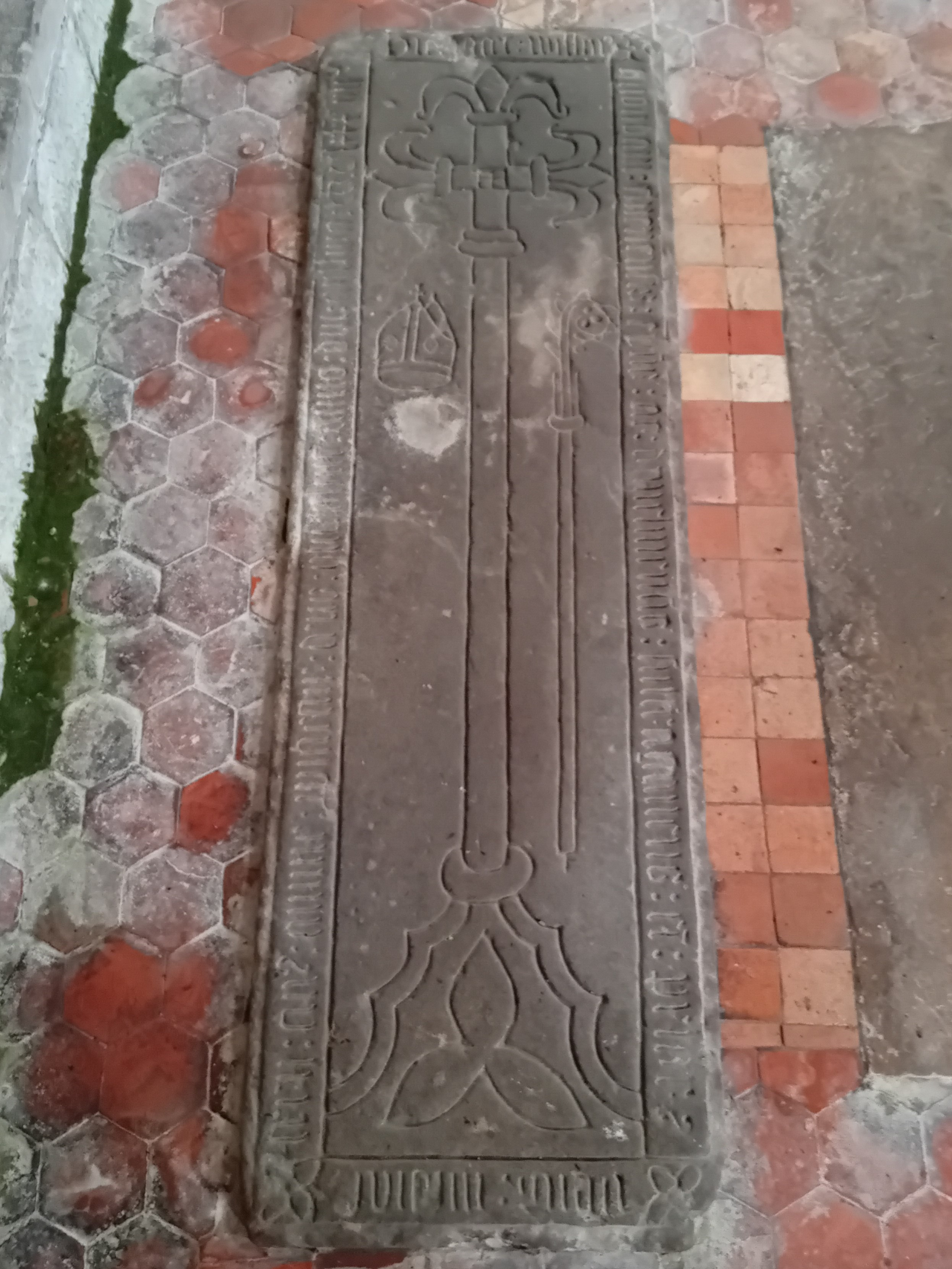
- Dudley's tombstone in Brinkburn Priory. The Latin inscription reads "Here lies William former Bishop of Cluny and Suffragan of Durham and Prior of the Monastery whose soul has returned to God. He died AD 1484."
- Appointed: 31 July 1476
- Term ended: 29 November 1483
- Predecessor: Laurence Booth
- Successor: John Sherwood

Orders
- Consecration: between 1 September and 12 October 1476

Personal details
- Died: 29 November 1483
- Denomination: Catholic

William Dudley (died 1483) was Dean of Windsor and then Bishop of Durham.

Born William Sutton, of Dudley, he was a younger son of John Sutton, 1st Baron Dudley. He was made a canon of St George's Chapel, Windsor and Dean of the Chapel Royal in 1471 and elevated to Dean of Windsor in 1473, a position which he held with that of Dean of Wolverhampton: thereafter the two posts were customarily held by the same man.

Dudley was nominated to Durham on 31 July 1476 and was consecrated between 1 September and 12 October 1476. In 1483 he supported Richard, Duke of Gloucester, the future King Richard III, in his bid for the Throne of England. In the last months of his life he was Chancellor of Oxford University. Dudley died on 29 November 1483.

== Citations ==
Catholic Church titles
Preceded by Laurence Booth	Bishop of Durham; 1476–1483	Succeeded by John Sherwood
Academic offices
Preceded by Lionel Woodville	Chancellor of the University of Oxford; 1483	Succeeded by John Russell
