= Thomas Langton =

15th-century English bishop

- Bishop of Winchester
- Appointed: 1493
- Term ended: 27 January 1501
- Predecessor: Peter Courtenay
- Successor: Richard Foxe
- Other post: Archbishop-elect of Canterbury
- Previous posts: Bishop of St David's; Bishop of Salisbury

Orders
- Consecration: August or September 1483

Personal details
- Born: Appleby-in-Westmorland, England
- Died: 27 January 1501 England
- Buried: Winchester Cathedral
- Denomination: Roman Catholic

Thomas Langton (died 27 January 1501) was chaplain to King Edward IV, before becoming successively Bishop of St David's, Bishop of Salisbury, Bishop of Winchester, and Archbishop-elect of Canterbury.

== Early life ==
Langton was born in Appleby-in-Westmorland, and educated by the Carmelite friars there. He matriculated at Queen's College, Oxford, but soon removed to Cambridge, probably to Clare Hall, on account of the plague. In 1461 he was elected fellow of Pembroke Hall, serving as proctor in 1462. While at Cambridge he took both degrees in canon law, and was afterwards incorporated in them at Oxford.

In 1464 he left the university, and some time before 1476 was made chaplain to King Edward IV. Langton was in high favour with the king, who trusted him much, and sent him on various important embassies. In 1467 he went as ambassador to France, and as king's chaplain was sent to treat with Ferdinand II, king of Aragon, on 24 November 1476. He visited France again on diplomatic business on 30 November 1477, and on 11 August 1478, to conclude the espousals of Edward's daughter Elizabeth and Charles, son of the French king. Two years later he was sent to demand the fulfilment of this marriage treaty, but the prince, now Charles VIII, king of France, refused to carry it out, and the match was broken off.

== Career ==
Meanwhile, Langton received much ecclesiastical preferment. In 1478 he was made treasurer of Exeter, prebendary of St. Decuman's, Wells Cathedral, and about the same time master of St. Julian's Hospital, Southampton, a post which he still retained twenty years later. He was presented on 1 July 1480 to All Hallows Church, Bread Street, and on 14 May 1482 to All Hallows, Lombard Street, City of London, also becoming prebendary of North Kelsey, Lincoln Cathedral, in the next year. Probably by the favour of King Edward V, who granted him the temporalities of the see on 21 May, Langton was advanced in 1483 to the bishopric of St. Davids; the papal bull confirming the election is dated 4 July, and he was consecrated in August or September.

Langton's prosperity did not decline with Edward V's deposition. He was sent on an embassy to Rome and to France by King Richard III, who translated him to the bishopric of Salisbury by papal bull dated 8 February 1485. Langton was also elected provost of Queen's College, Oxford, on 6 December 1487, a post which he seems to have retained till 1495. He was a considerable benefactor to the college, where he built some new sets of rooms and enlarged the provost's lodgings. In 1493 King Henry VII transferred him from Salisbury to Winchester, a see which had been vacant over a year.

During the seven years that he was bishop of Winchester Langton started a school in the precincts of the palace, where he had youths trained in grammar and music. He was a good musician himself, used to examine the scholars in person, and encourage them by good words and small rewards. Finally, a proof of his ever-increasing popularity, Langton was elected Archbishop of Canterbury on 22 January 1501, but died of the plague on the 27th, before the confirmation of the deed. He was buried in a marble tomb within 'a very fair chapel' which he had built south of the lady-chapel in Winchester Cathedral.

== Death ==
Before his death he had given 10 pounds towards the erection of Great St. Mary's Church, Cambridge, and in 1497 a drinking-cup, weighing 67 ounces, called the 'Anathema Cup,' to Pembroke Hall. This is the oldest extant hanap or covered cup that is hall-marked. By his will, dated 16 January 1501, Langton left large sums of money to the priests of Clare Hall, Cambridge, money and vestments to the fellows and priests of Queen's College, Oxford, besides legacies to the friars at both universities, and to the Carmelites at Appleby-in-Westmorland. To his sister and her husband, Rowland Machel, lands (probably the family estates) in Westmorland and two hundred marks were bequeathed. An annual pension of eight marks was set aside to maintain a chapel at Appleby-in-Westmorland for a hundred years to pray for the souls of Langton, his parents, and all the faithful deceased at Appleby-in-Westmorland.

== Citations ==
Catholic Church titles
Preceded by Richard Martyn	Bishop of St David's; 1483–1485	Succeeded by Hugh Pavy
Preceded by Lionel Woodville	Bishop of Salisbury; 1485–1493	Succeeded by John Blyth
Preceded by Peter Courtenay	Bishop of Winchester; 1493–1501	Succeeded by Richard Foxe
Preceded by John Morton (archbishop)	Archbishop-elect of Canterbury; 1501	Succeeded by Henry Deane (archbishop)
