= John Russell (bishop) =

15th-century Bishop of Lincoln and Chancellor of England

- Bishop of Lincoln
- Appointed: 7 July 1480
- Term ended: 30 December 1494
- Predecessor: Thomas Rotherham
- Successor: William Smyth
- Previous post: Bishop of Rochester

Orders
- Consecration: 22 September 1476

Personal details
- Died: 30 December 1494
- Denomination: Catholic

John Russell (died 30 December 1494) was an English Bishop of Rochester and bishop of Lincoln and Lord Chancellor.

== Life ==
Russell was admitted to Winchester College in 1443, and in 1449 went to Oxford as Fellow of New College. He resigned his fellowship in 1462, and appears to have entered the royal service.

He was appointed Archdeacon of Berkshire and served from 1466 to 1476.

In April 1467 and January 1468 Russell was employed on diplomatic missions for Edward IV of England to Charles the Bold, at Bruges. He was there again in February 1470 as one of the envoys to invest Charles with the Order of the Garter: the Latin speech which Russell delivered on this last occasion was one of William Caxton's earliest publications, probably printed for him at Bruges by Colard Mansion.

In May 1474 Russell was promoted to be Lord Privy Seal, and retained his office even after his consecration as bishop of Rochester on 22 September 1476, and translation to the post of bishop of Lincoln on 7 July 1480.

As a trusted minister of Edward IV, Russell was one of the executors of the king's will. After Lord Chancellor Thomas Rotherham, Archbishop of York, had been dismissed due to his mishandling of the great seal, Russell was appointed to succeed him on 13 May 1483. Reportedly, Russell accepted the appointment only with reluctance. He remained chancellor under King Richard III until being dismissed on 29 July 1485.

Russell was above all things an official, and was sometimes employed by Henry VII in public affairs. But his last years were occupied chiefly with the business of his diocese, and of the university of Oxford, of which he had been elected chancellor in 1483. He died at Nettleham, and was buried at Lincoln Cathedral.

Sir Thomas More called Russell "a wise manne and a good, and of much experience, and one of the best-learned men, undoubtedly, that England had in hys time." Two English speeches composed by Russell, for the intended parliament of Edward V, and the first parliament of Richard III, are printed in Nichols's Grants of Edward V. Some other writings remain in manuscript.

== Citations ==
Political offices
Preceded by Thomas Rotherham	Lord Privy Seal; 1474–1483	Succeeded by John Gunthorpe
Preceded by Thomas Rotherham	Lord Chancellor; 1483–1485	Succeeded by Thomas Rotherham
Catholic Church titles
Preceded by John Alcock	Bishop of Rochester; 1476–1480	Succeeded by Edmund Audley
Preceded by Thomas Rotherham	Bishop of Lincoln; 1480–1494	Succeeded by William Smyth
Academic offices
Preceded by William Dudley	Chancellor of the University of Oxford; 1483–1494	Succeeded by John Morton
