= John Blyth (bishop) =

Bishop of Salisbury (died 1499)

- Bishop of Salisbury
- Appointed: 13 November 1493
- Term ended: 23 August 1499
- Predecessor: Thomas Langton
- Successor: Henry Deane
- Previous post: Archdeacon of Richmond

Orders
- Consecration: 23 February 1494

Personal details
- Died: 23 August 1499
- Denomination: Catholic

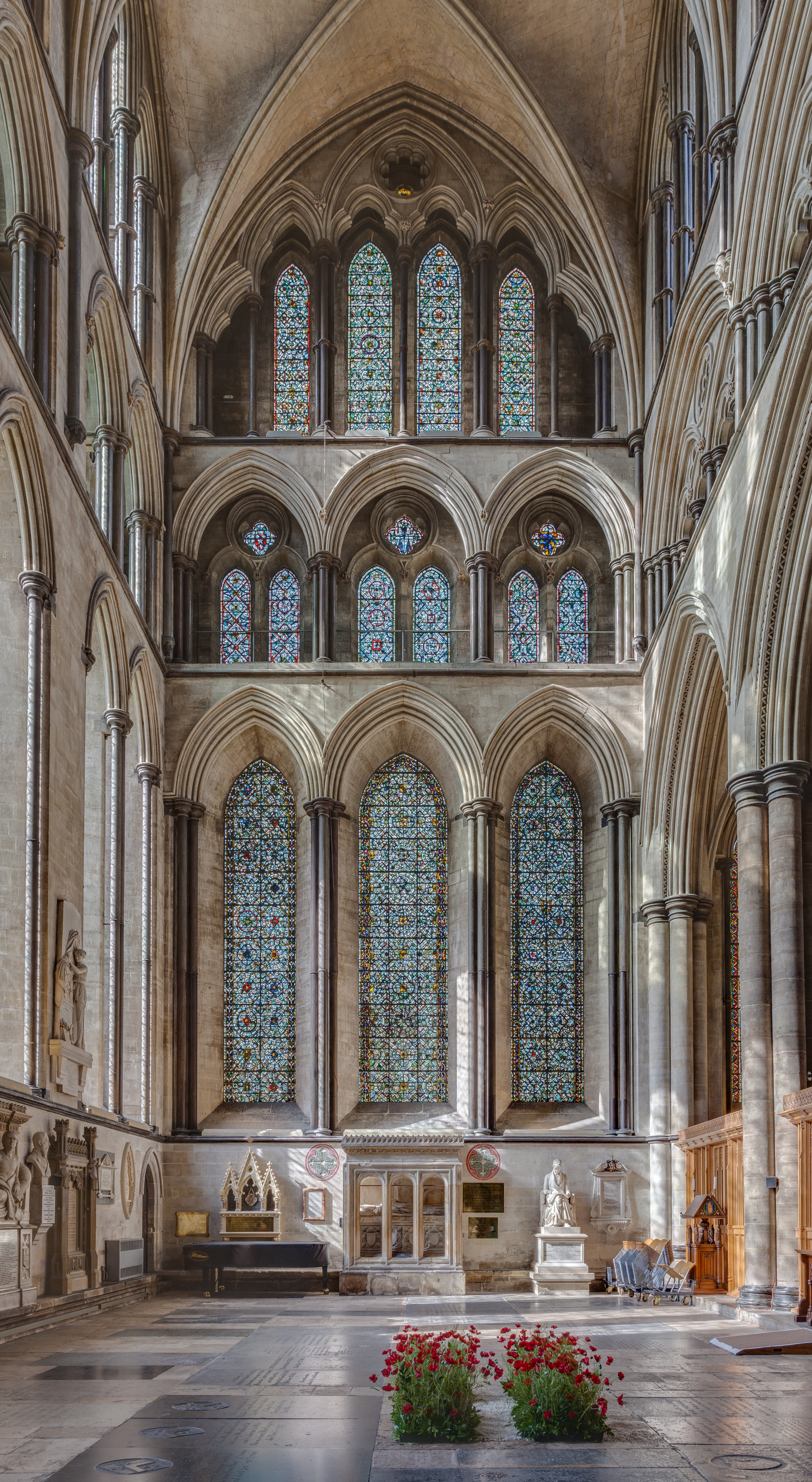
North transept of the Salisbury Cathedral with the tomb of John Blyth in the middle.

John Blyth or John Blythe (before 1460 – 23 August 1499) was a medieval Bishop of Salisbury.

Blyth was Archdeacon of Richmond from 1485 to 1493 and was Master of the Rolls 5 May 1492 – 13 February 1494. He was nominated to Salisbury on 13 November 1493 and consecrated on 23 February 1494, serving until his death five-and-a-half years later, on 23 August 1499. His brother Geoffrey was Bishop of Lichfield.

== Notes ==
- Fryde, E. B.; Greenway, D. E.; Porter, S.; Roy, I. (1996). Handbook of British Chronology (Third revised ed.). Cambridge: Cambridge University Press. ISBN 0-521-56350-X.
- Jones, B. Fasti Ecclesiae Anglicanae 1300-1541: volume 6: Northern province (York, Carlisle and Durham): Archdeacons: Richmond. Institute for Historical Research.

Catholic Church titles
| Preceded by Thomas Langton | Bishop of Salisbury; 1493–1499 | Succeeded by Henry Deane |
