= John Alcock (bishop) =

15th-century English Bishop and Chancellor of England

- Bishop of Ely
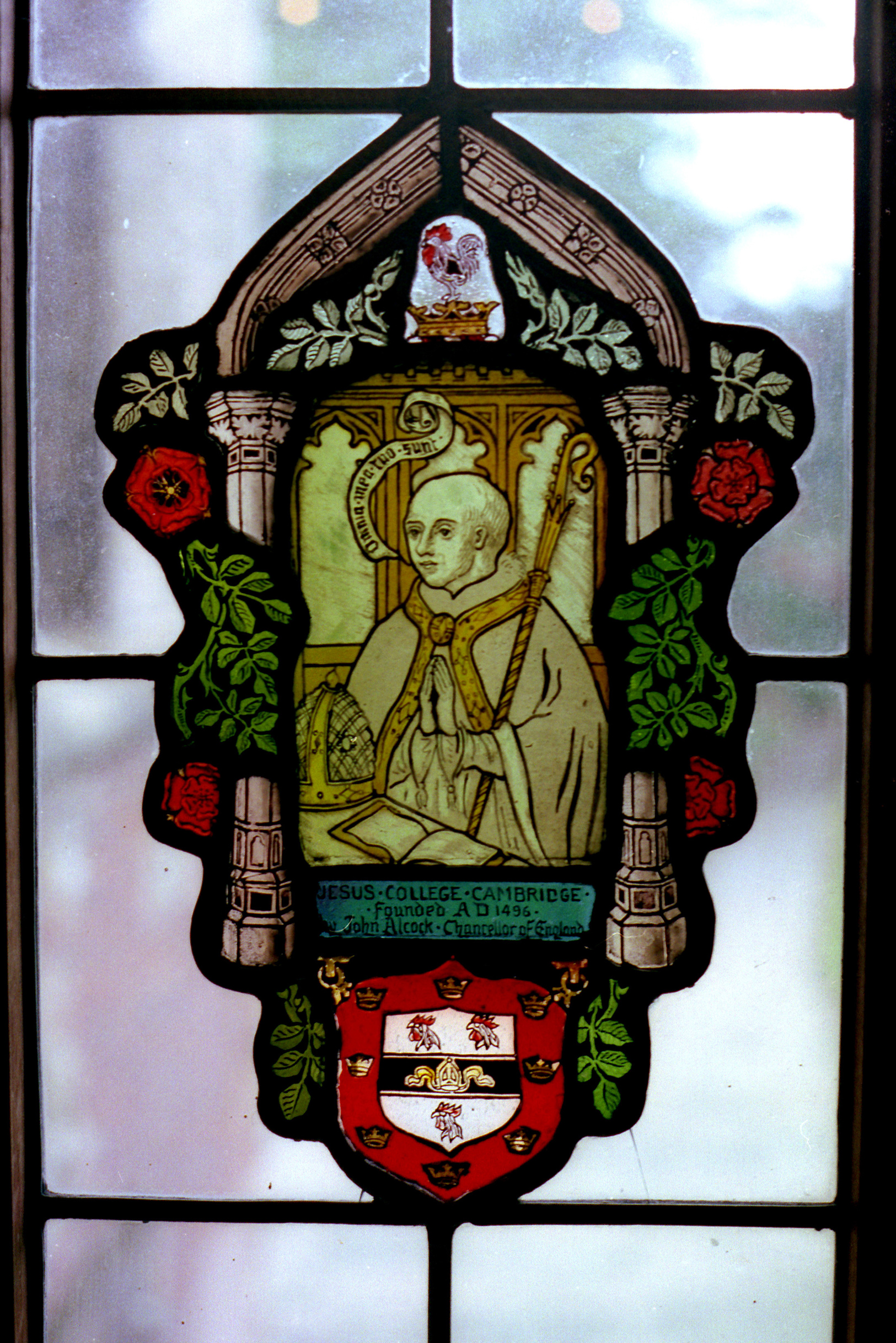
- Stained glass depicting John Alcock, in Jesus College, Cambridge, which he founded
- Appointed: 6 October 1486
- Term ended: 1 October 1500
- Predecessor: John Morton
- Successor: Richard Redman
- Previous posts: Bishop of Rochester; Bishop of Worcester

Orders
- Consecration: 15 March 1472 by Thomas Bourchier

Personal details
- Born: c. 1430 Beverley, Yorkshire
- Died: 1 October 1500
- Denomination: Catholic

John Alcock (c. 1430 – 1 October 1500) was an English churchman, bishop and Lord Chancellor.

== Biography ==
Alcock was born at Beverley in Yorkshire, son of Sir William Alcock, Burgess of Kingston upon Hull, and was educated at Beverley Grammar School and the University of Cambridge. In 1461 he was made dean of St Stephen's Chapel, Westminster, and his subsequent promotion was rapid in both church and state. In the following year he was made Master of the Rolls, and in 1470 was sent as ambassador to the Crown Court of Castile. He was nominated to the see of Rochester on 8 January 1472, was consecrated Bishop of Rochester on 15 March and was successively translated to the see of Worcester on 15 July 1476 and the see of Ely on 6 October 1486. He was the first president of the Council of the Marches in Wales from 1473 to 1500. He twice held the office of Lord Chancellor, once from 10 June 1475 to 28 September 1475 (during the absence of the Lord Chancellor Thomas Rotheram and then again from 7 October 1485 to 6 March 1487.

Alcock was one of the leading pre-Reformation divines; he was a man of deep learning and also of great proficiency as an architect. Besides founding a charity at Beverley and endowing Hull Grammar School, he restored many churches and colleges; but his greatest achievement was the building of Jesus College, Cambridge, which he established on the site of the former Convent of St Radegund.

Alcock was appointed to the Council in 1470 and became Master of the Rolls in 1471, soon after being appointed tutor to King Edward IV's eldest son, Prince Edward. After the King's death he was with Prince Edward when he was intercepted by Richard, Duke of Gloucester, at Stony Stratford. Alcock was arrested and removed from office but soon rejoined the council. He was with King Richard III when he entered York in August 1483 and was a member of the English delegation that met the Scots at Nottingham.

Later Alcock was one of several clerics who openly canvassed the proposition that Henry Tudor marry Elizabeth of York. Appointed temporary Lord Chancellor he opened King Henry VII's first Parliament on 7 November 1485 and became one of the new king's most trusted servants.

Alcock died on 1 October 1500 and lies buried in the Alcock Chantry in Ely Cathedral.

== Writings ==
Alcock's published writings, most of which are extremely rare, are: Mons Perfectionis, or the Hill of Perfection (London, 1497); Gallicontus Johannis Alcock episcopi Eliensis ad frates suos curatas in sinodo apud Barnwell (1498), a good specimen of early English printing and quaint illustrations; The Castle of Labour, translated from the French (1536), and various other tracts and homilies.

== Citations ==
Political offices
Preceded by Laurence Booth	Lord Chancellor; 1475	Succeeded by Thomas Rotherham
Preceded by Thomas Rotherham	Lord Chancellor; 1485–1487	Succeeded by John Morton
Catholic Church titles
Preceded by Thomas Rotherham	Bishop of Rochester; 1472–1476	Succeeded by John Russell
Preceded by John Carpenter	Bishop of Worcester; 1476–1486	Succeeded by Robert Morton
Preceded by John Morton	Bishop of Ely; 1486–1500	Succeeded by Richard Redman
