= Robert Tracy (judge) =

English judge (1655–1735)

Robert Tracy (1655–1735) was an English judge.

== Origins ==
Born in 1655 at Toddington in Gloucestershire, he was the fifth son of Robert Tracy, 2nd Viscount Tracy of Rathcoole (died 1662) and his second wife, Dorothy Cocks (died 1685), daughter of Thomas Cocks, of Castleditch at Eastnor in Herefordshire. His paternal grandparents were John Tracy, 1st Viscount Tracy, and his wife Anne Shirley, daughter of Sir Thomas Shirley, of Wiston in Sussex.

== Life ==
He matriculated from Oriel College, Oxford, on 29 October 1672, and entered the Middle Temple the following year.

Tracy was called to the bar in 1680. In 1692 he stood for election to Parliament at Tewkesbury in a by-election to replace Lord Capell, but was defeated by Sir Francis Winnington. In July 1699 he was appointed a judge of the King's Bench in Ireland, but the following year he was transferred to England on 14 November as a baron of the Exchequer. In Trinity term 1702 he was removed to the Court of Common Pleas. He was appointed a commissioner of the Great Seal while the lord-chancellor's office was vacant from 24 September to 19 October 1710, and from 15 April to 12 May 1718. He was one of the judges who gave an opinion on Henry Sacheverell's trial and he took part in trying the Jacobites at Carlisle in 1716.

On 26 October 1726, he retired from the bench with an annual pension of £1,500. He died in the house he had built at Coscomb in the parish of Didbrook in Gloucestershire on 11 September 1735 and was buried in the parish church.

== Family ==
On 29 August 1683 he married Anne Dowdeswell (1659-1714), daughter of William Dowdeswell, of Pull Court at Bushley in Worcestershire, and his wife Judith Wymondsell. They had three sons — Robert, Richard, and William — and two daughters — Anne and Dorothy. Dorothy married as his second wife John Pratt, fourth son of Sir John Pratt, chief justice of the King's Bench.
