= Rugemont Castle =

Castle in Bedfordshire, England

- Ridgmont, Bedfordshire, England

Site information
- Type: Castle
- Condition: Earthworks

Location
- Coordinates: 52.036109°N 0.586823°W

Rugemont Castle was a castle in the village of Ridgmont, in the county of Bedfordshire, England (grid reference SP97033846).

== History ==
Not much is known about Rugemont Castle, as the castle was not mentioned prior to the 12th century. It was believed to have been a timber castle, the stronghold of the Wahull family, and later the de Grey family. In 1276, Walter Beywin is described as holding "7 selions 'above the castle of Rugemont'".

The castle appears to have been attached to Brogborough Manor, where Oliver Cromwell is said to have stayed for a short time during the Civil War and to have made use of its entrenchments.

The interpreted site of Rugemont Castle is the earthwork remains of an early medieval ringwork. Much of the site was destroyed by the construction of the Round House in the 19th century. The site is a Scheduled Monument.
