= Lionel Woodville =

15th-century Bishop of Salisbury

- Bishop of Salisbury
- Appointed: 7 January 1482
- Term ended: c. 23 June 1484
- Predecessor: Richard Beauchamp
- Successor: Thomas Langton

Orders
- Consecration: 21 April 1482 by Thomas Cardinal Bourchier

Personal details
- Born: c. 1446 Grafton Regis, Northamptonshire, Kingdom of England
- Died: c. 23 June 1484, c. 38 years old
- Denomination: Catholic
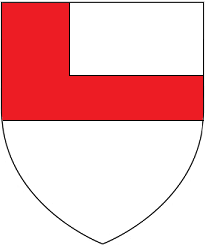
- Coat of arms

Lionel Woodville (1447 – 23 June 1484) was a Bishop of Salisbury in England.

== Life ==
Woodville was a fourth son of Richard Woodville, 1st Earl Rivers and Jacquetta of Luxembourg; his siblings included Elizabeth Woodville, Queen Consort from 1464 to 1483.

In the late 1470s, Woodville became the first person in recorded history to receive an honorary degree (DCL), from the University of Oxford. He was Chancellor of the University of Oxford from 1479 to 1483.

After a number of more minor clerical positions, Woodville was elected Dean of Exeter in November 1478, and held the position until 1482, when he became Bishop of Salisbury. He was nominated to Salisbury on 7 January 1482 and consecrated on 21 April 1482.

Woodville died about 23 June 1484.

== Citations ==
Catholic Church titles
Preceded by Richard Beauchamp	Bishop of Salisbury; 1482–1484	Succeeded by Thomas Langton
Academic offices
Preceded by Thomas Chaundeler	Chancellor of the University of Oxford; 1479–1483	Succeeded by William Dudley
