= Henry Deane (archbishop of Canterbury) =

Archbishop of Canterbury from 1501 to 1503

- Archbishop of Canterbury
- Church: Catholic Church
- Elected: 26 April 1501
- Term ended: 15 February 1503
- Predecessor: John Morton
- Successor: William Warham
- Other posts: Lord Chancellor of Ireland (1491–1496); Deputy Lord Lieutenant of Ireland (1496); Bishop of Bangor (1494–1500); Bishop of Salisbury (1500–1501); Lord Keeper of the Great Seal (1500–1502)

Personal details
- Born: c. 1440
- Died: 15 February 1503 Lambeth Palace, Surrey, England
- Buried: Canterbury Cathedral, Kent, England

Henry Deane (c. 1440 – 1503) was Archbishop of Canterbury from 1501 until his death.

== Early life and education ==
In 1457, circa age 17, Deane is recorded as a Canon of Llanthony by Gloucester, his first appearance in the records.

In 1473 (ca age 33) and again in 1488 (ca age 48), Deane is recorded as having rented rooms from Exeter College, Oxford, from which it has been assumed that he was a student at the university.

== Career ==
=== Legal career ===
In 1481, circa age 41, Deane was able to join the priory of Llanthony Prima in Monmouthshire to his own priory. He instituted a programme of building works at his priory and also added his own arms to the gatehouse. Later in 1485 when Henry VII came to the throne, Deane was able to continue in royal favour.

In 1489, Deane was admitted to the society of Lincoln's Inn, suggesting knowledge of common law. On 13 September 1494, as part of a campaign to staff the Irish judiciary with Englishmen of proven loyalty to the Tudor dynasty, he was appointed Lord Chancellor of Ireland under Sir Edward Poynings, in which capacity he made the opening address at the Drogheda Parliament of December 1494. When Poynings was recalled in January 1496, Deane was appointed his successor as Deputy Governor, but sour relations with the local clergy led to his removal in August of the same year.

=== Bishopric ===
On 13 April 1494, Deane was appointed Bishop of Bangor (confirmed by the Pope in July 1495), where he engaged in rebuilding the fortunes of the diocese after the rebellion led by Owain Glyndŵr. On 7 December 1499, Henry VII appointed him to the much more significant bishopric of Salisbury, confirmed by the Pope on 8 January 1500.

=== Archbishropic ===
On 13 October 1500, at age 60, after the death of the Chancellor, Archbishop John Morton, Deane was appointed Lord Keeper of the Great Seal, which he held until 27 July 1502. Thomas Langton, Bishop of Winchester, was elected to succeed Morton at Canterbury, but following his death on 27 January 1501, Deane was, in turn, elected on 26 April 1501. He was the first monastic to be elevated to Canterbury for 135 years and the last.

As archbishop, Deane's main contribution was the negotiation of the Treaty of Perpetual Peace (signed January 1502) between England and Scotland, which also arranged the marriage of Margaret Tudor, daughter of Henry VII, and James IV of Scotland. He also officiated at the wedding of Arthur, Prince of Wales and Catherine of Aragon, assisted by 19 bishops, on 14 November 1501.

== Death ==
On 15 February 1503, Deane died and was subsequently buried at Canterbury on 24 February. Sir Reginald Bray was one of his executors. Elrington Ball described him as one of the greatest ecclesiastical statesmen of his age.

Catholic Church titles
Preceded by Thomas Ednam	Bishop of Bangor; 1494–1500	Succeeded by Thomas Pigot
Preceded by John Blyth	Bishop of Salisbury; 1500–1501	Succeeded by Edmund Audley
Preceded by John Morton	Archbishop of Canterbury; 1501–1503	Succeeded by William Warham
Political offices
Preceded by John Morton as Lord Chancellor	Lord Keeper; 1500–1502	Succeeded by William Warham
