= John Fountaine =

Commissioner of the great seal of England (1600–1671)

John Fountaine (1600–1671) was commissioner of the great seal of England from 1659 to 1660. He was imprisoned for refusing to pay the parliament's war tax in 1642, during the First English Civil War.

Admitted to the bar in 1629, Fountaine distinguished himself by refusing to pay the war tax levied by parliament and, pursuant to a resolution of the House of Commons was "secured and disarmed" and imprisoned in the Gatehouse. He is thought to have been a member of parliament, due to having been granted the privilege of attending services in St. Margaret's Church while imprisoned, though he does not appear on surviving lists of members.

He was involved in royalist organizing in 1645, but later recommended compromise, and joined the anti-royalist government. For this, Edward Foss labelled him "Turncoat Fountaine".

In 1651 he was pardoned and restored to full citizenship, and later appointed to various public offices. He continued to hold offices after the Restoration.
