= Thomas Rotherham =

Archbishop of York from 1480 to 1500

The Most Reverend and Right Honourable Thomas Rotherham
- Archbishop of York and Primate of England
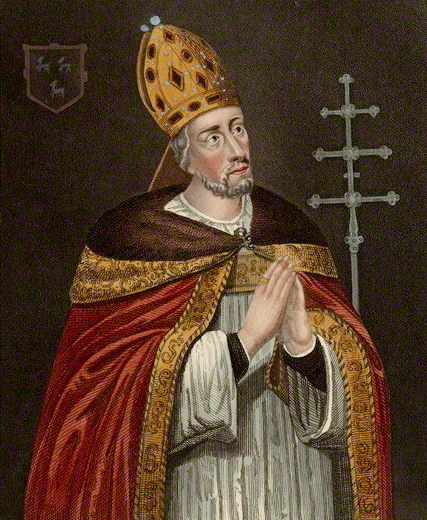
- Portrait of Thomas Rotherham from "Historic Notices of Rotherham", by John Guest,1879
- Appointed: 7 July 1480
- Installed: unknown
- Term ended: 29 May 1500
- Predecessor: Lawrence Booth
- Successor: Thomas Savage
- Other posts: Bishop of Rochester; Bishop of Lincoln

Personal details
- Born: 24 August 1423 Rotherham, Yorkshire
- Died: 29 May 1500 (aged 76) Cawood Castle
- Buried: York Minster
- Denomination: Roman Catholic
- Education: Eton College; King's College, Cambridge

Thomas Rotherham (24 August 1423 – 29 May 1500), also known as Thomas (Scot) de Rotherham, was an English cleric and statesman. He served as bishop of several dioceses, most notably as Archbishop of York and, on two occasions as Lord Chancellor. He is considered a venerable figure in Rotherham, South Yorkshire, his town of birth.

== Life ==
=== Background ===
Thomas Rotherham was born on 24 August 1423 in Rotherham, Yorkshire. He is said to have been the eldest son of Sir Thomas Rotherham of Rotherham and his wife, Dame Alice. From the sixteenth century onwards he was also known by the alternate surname 'Scot', although that surname was not used by Rotherham himself or by his contemporaries. In his will, however, Rotherham does refer to his kinsman John Scott of Ecclesfield, Yorkshire, and it has been speculated that he was the son of Sir John Scott of Scot's Hall in Smeeth, Kent and Agnes Beaufitz. However this claim is said to have been disproved.

=== Education ===
He was first educated as a young boy by a teacher of grammar, who came, according to Thomas, "I know not by what fate save it was the Grace of God". Afterwards he was sent to the newly founded Eton College to prepare for university entrance.

=== Appointments to office ===
Rotherham was educated at King's College, Cambridge, graduating as a Bachelor of Divinity and becoming a Fellow of his college, and lectured on Grammar, Theology, and Philosophy. After his ordination as a priest, he became a prebendary of Lincoln in 1462 and then of Salisbury in 1465. He moved on to powerful positions in the Church, being appointed as Bishop of Rochester in 1468, Bishop of Lincoln in 1472, and then Archbishop of York in 1480, a position he held until 1500.

In 1467, King Edward IV appointed Rotherham as Keeper of the Privy Seal. He was sent as ambassador to France in 1468 and as joint ambassador to Burgundy in 1471, and in 1475 was entrusted with the office of Lord Chancellor. Between 1477 and his death, Rotherham was the owner of Barnes Hall in South Yorkshire.

=== Involvement in intrigue ===
When Edward IV died in April 1483, Rotherham was one of the celebrants of the funeral mass on 20 April 1483. Immediately after Edward's death, Rotherham sided with dowager queen Elizabeth Woodville in her attempt to deprive Richard, Duke of Gloucester of his role as Lord Protector during the minority of the new King, her son Edward V. When Elizabeth sought sanctuary after Richard had taken charge of the king, Rotherham released the Great Seal to her. Though he later recovered it and handed it over to Thomas Bourchier, Archbishop of Canterbury, his mishandling of the seal – indicative of questionable loyalty, led to his dismissal as Lord Chancellor. On 13 May he was replaced by John Russell, who earlier had also been his successor as Bishop of Lincoln.

On 13 June 1483, Rotherham was charged with being involved in a conspiracy with Lord Hastings and the Bishop of Ely against Richard and imprisoned in the Tower of London. He was released in the middle of July.

=== Retirement ===
Once again appointed Lord Chancellor in 1485, he was shortly afterwards dismissed by Henry VII. After this he retired from most public work.

== Death and memorial ==
Rotherham died of the plague in Cawood near York on 29 May 1500. His remains were transferred to a magnificent marble tomb in York Minster in 1506.

== Endowments ==
Rotherham built part of Lincoln College, Oxford, and increased its endowment; at Cambridge, where he was four times Chancellor and Master of Pembroke Hall, he helped to build the University Library.

In 1480 Rotherham endowed a Chapel of Jesus within Rotherham parish church, providing a priest to sing masses for the souls of his ancestors. He founded the College of Jesus in Rotherham as a memorial to his first teacher. The foundations of the red brick College were laid at his birthplace in Brookgate in March 1482 and a licence was granted on 22 January 1483 "for the honour and glory of the name of Jesus Christ to found a perpetual College".

The statutes of the college were dated 1 February 1483. The College of Jesus was to consist of a Provost and three Fellows, all to be in Holy Orders, who must attend church on Sundays and Holy Days. The Fellows were to teach grammar and train the six choristers of Jesus in song and music. They were also to teach promising boys who did not aspire to the priesthood reading, writing, and reckoning, free of charge. If the boys continued to show merit, they should be taught the rudiments of grammar and music. The college was dissolved around 1550 by Edward VI and all its possessions seized by the crown. Very little now remains of the original building, although the street is still known as College Street.

The teaching of grammar to boys continued at Rotherham after the 1550s. The Rotherham Grammar School looked upon Thomas Rotherham as its founder, took 1483 to be its year of origin, and adopted as its badge the armorial bearings of Thomas Rotherham. The school took its last intake of boys in September 1965 and was progressively phased-out over the following several years.

Rotherham is still remembered in the name of Thomas Rotherham College, which is the post-1967 descendant of the Rotherham Grammar School for Boys.

== Citations ==
Political offices
Preceded by Robert Stillington	Lord Privy Seal; 1467–1470	Succeeded by John Hales
Preceded by John Hales	Lord Privy Seal; 1471–1474	Succeeded by John Russell
Preceded by John Alcock	Lord Chancellor; 1475–1483	Succeeded by John Russell
Preceded by John Russell	Lord Chancellor; 1485	Succeeded by John Alcock
Catholic Church titles
Preceded by John Low	Bishop of Rochester; 1468–1472	Succeeded by John Alcock
Preceded by John Chadworth	Bishop of Lincoln; 1472–1480	Succeeded by John Russell
Preceded by Lawrence Booth	Archbishop of York; 1480–1500	Succeeded by Thomas Savage
Academic offices
Preceded by Laurence Booth	Master of Pembroke College, Cambridge; 1480–1488	Succeeded by George Fitzhugh
