= Matthew Rader =

Matthew Rader (also Matthäus, or Mathaeus) (1561 – 22 December 1634) was a Jesuit philologist and historian.

== Life ==
Rader was born in Innichen in Tyrol. At the age of twenty he entered the Society of Jesus and subsequently taught the humanities for twenty-one years in different Jesuit institutions. He wrote several school dramas, but was particularly known among Catholics and non-Catholics for his scholarly attainments. He died, aged 73, in Munich.

== Works ==
In 1599 he published an improved and expurgated edition of Martial, and in 1628 one of Quintus Curtius Rufus. His edition of the Acts of the Eighth Ecumenical Council was incorporated by Philippe L'Abbe and Gabriel Cossart in their collection of the Acts of councils; that of the works of St. John Climacus, published in 1614, was reprinted by Jacques Paul Migne in his Patrologia Graeca (LXXXVIII, 585 sqq.).

His Bavaria Sancta (Munich, 1615-1627), and Bavaria Pia (Munich, 1628) were reprinted in 1704 in Dillingen and Augsburg. The former was partly published in a German translation by Maximilian Rassler, a Jesuit, in Straubing in 1840.

== Legacy ==
He is portrayed positively as a minor figure in the fictional 1632 series, also known as the 1632-verse or Ring of Fire series, an alternate history book series, created, primarily co-written, and coordinated by historian Eric Flint.
