= Eadbald =

Eadbald is an Anglo-Saxon male name, from the Old English words for rich and bold. It might refer to:

- Eadbald of Kent (died 640, King of Kent
- Eadbald (bishop of London) (died between 796 and 798)
- Eadbald of Lindsey (died between 866 and 869), Bishop of Lindsey

== See also ==
- Eanbald (disambiguation)
