= Æthelnoth =

Æthelnoth or its variations Aethelnoth and Ethelnoth may refer to:

- Æthelnoth (bishop of London) (died between 816 and 824)
- Æthelnoth (archbishop of Canterbury) (died 1038), medieval prelate considered a saint
