= Æthelweard =

Æthelweard, also spelled Ethelweard, Aethelweard, Athelweard, etc., is an Anglo-Saxon male name. It may refer to:

- King Æthelweard of the Hwicce (fl. 7/8th century)
- King Æthelweard of East Anglia (fl. mid-9th century)
- Æthelweard (son of Alfred) (fl. 9/10th century), younger son of King Alfred and Ealhswith
- Æthelweard (bishop of Sherborne) (d. c. 909)
- Æthelweard of London (d. c. 915), bishop of London
- Æthelweard (historian) (d. c. 998), ealdorman and historian
