= Cœnwalh =

Coenwalh is an Anglo-Saxon given name. Notable people with the name include:

- Cenwalh of Wessex (died 672), King of Wessex
- Coenwalh (bishop) (died c. 793), Bishop of London
