= Bishop of London =

Ordinary of the Church of England's Diocese of London

- Bishopric

anglican
- Arms of the Bishop of London: Gules, two swords in saltire points uppermost argent hilts and pommels or
- Incumbent; Vacant since 28 January 2026
- Style: The Right Reverend and Right Honourable

Location
- Ecclesiastical province: Canterbury
- Residence: The Old Deanery, Dean's Court, City of London

Information
- First holder: Thean
- Established: 4th century, but current establishment from 604
- Diocese: London
- Cathedral: St Paul's Cathedral

The bishop of London is diocesan bishop of the diocese of London in the Church of England. The bishop's seat, or cathedra, is at St Paul's Cathedral in the City of London. The diocese covers most of northern and western Greater London north of the River Thames and the district of Spelthorne in Surrey, an area approximately corresponding to the City and the historic county of Middlesex.

The bishop is third in seniority in the Church of England after the archbishops of Canterbury and York, and is one of five bishops who have an automatic right to sit as one of the 26 Lords Spiritual in the House of Lords. Since 1723 it has also been customary for the bishop to be appointed dean of the Chapel Royal. Historically, the bishop's residence was Fulham Palace. Since 1973, other residences in central London have been used, including The Old Deanery near St Paul's Cathedral. The bishop has had direct episcopal oversight in the Two Cities area (the City of London and the City of Westminster) since the institution of the London area scheme in 1979.

The bishopric is currently vacant after the 134th bishop, Sarah Mullally, was translated to Canterbury on 28 January 2026.

== History ==
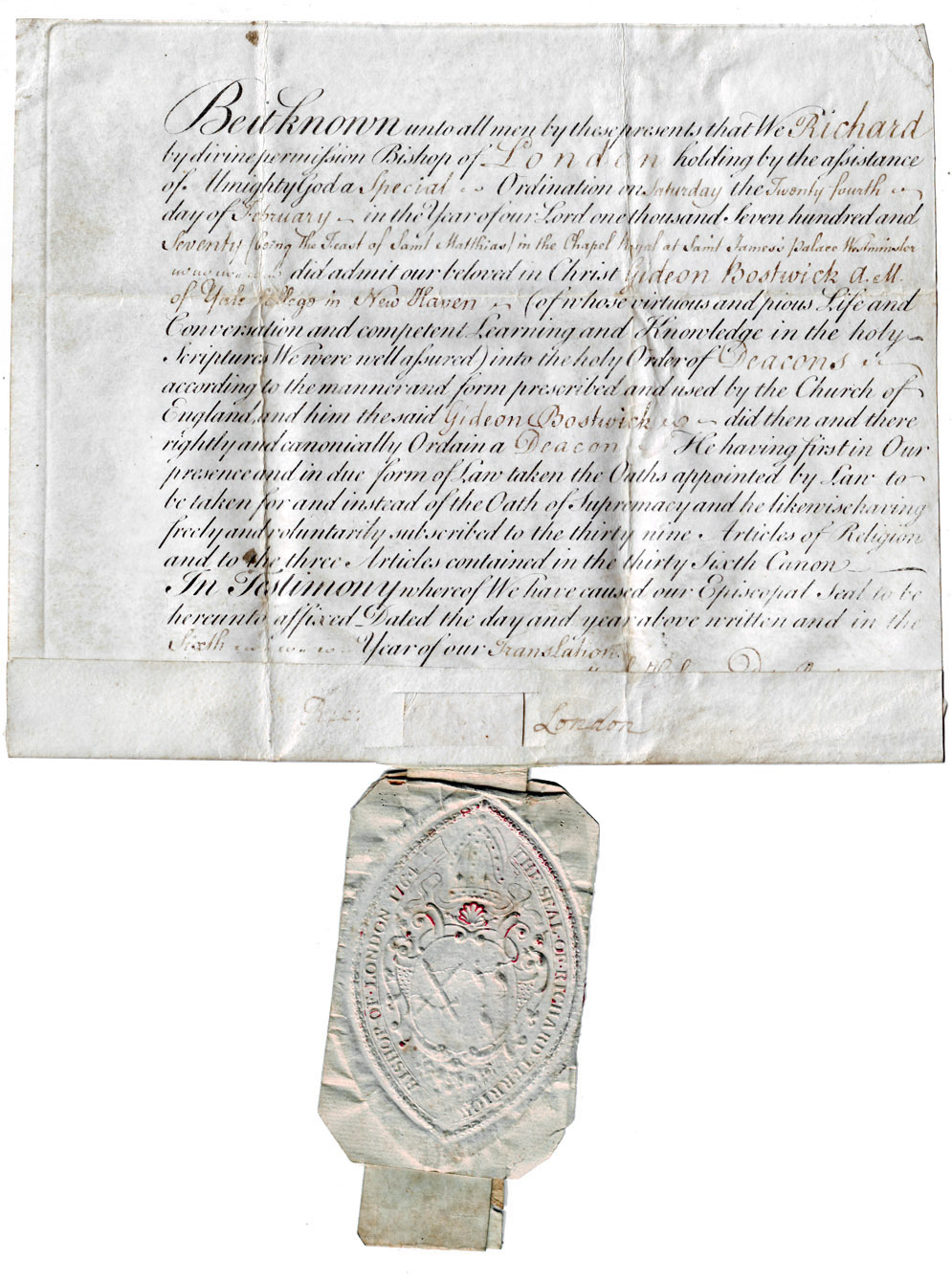
A certificate of ordination (with seal) given at Westminster by Richard Terrick, Bishop of London, 24 February 1770. The arms on the seal are blazoned: Per pale: 1. Gules, two swords in saltire points uppermost argent hilts and pommels or (for the office of the Bishop of London), and 2. ___ (the personal arms of Richard Terrick?), surmounted by a bishop's mitre above an escallop.

The first mention of Christianity in England comes from Tertullian, possibly writing in the early 200s, but the first mention of an implied church in London relates to a Bishop of London, either Restitus or Aldephius, attending the Council of Arles in 314 AD. (Note: "Nomina Episcoporum, cum Clericis Suis, Quinam, et ex Quibus Provinciis, ad Arelatensem Synodum Convenerint" ["The Names of the Bishops with Their Clerics who Came Together at the Synod of Arles and from which Province They Came"] from the Consilia in Thackeray)

The location of Londinium's original cathedral is uncertain. The present structure of St Peter upon Cornhill was designed by Christopher Wren following the Great Fire in 1666 and stands upon the highest point in the area of old Londinium, but possibly more significantly directly above the location of a pagan shrine room (aedes) within the great Roman London basilica.

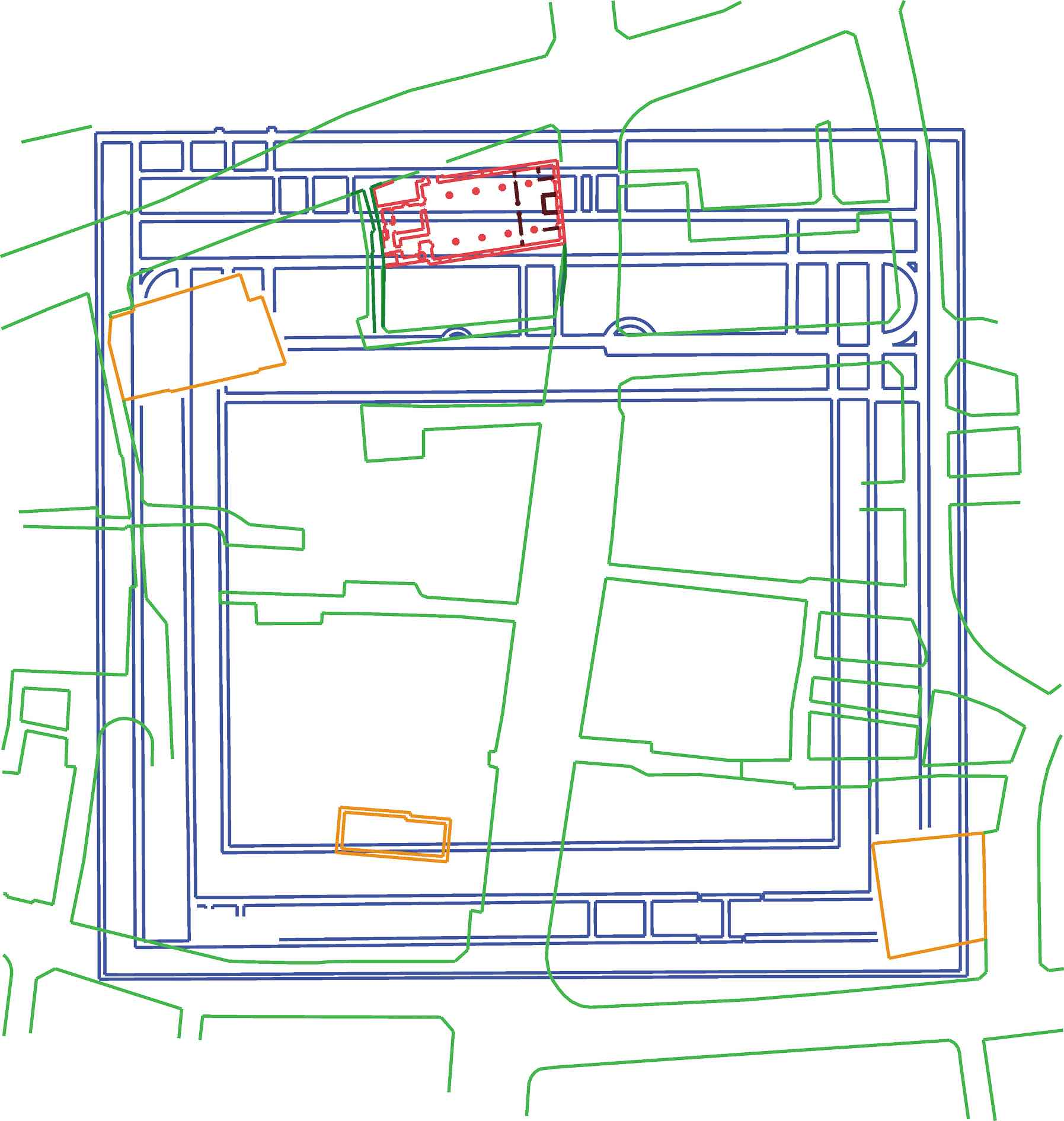
St Peter upon Cornhill church and location above London Roman Forum

There is a medieval tradition which maintains that the church was founded by King Lucius in AD 199. If St Peter's was built in the Roman era, it would make the church contemporaneous to the Romano-British church at Silchester, similarly built adjacent to the Roman Basilica and most likely pre-Constantine in age.

Some caution may be exercised in this respect however, as other research suggests it very rare for early English Christian churches to be founded in pagan temples, and that when temples were turned into churches, this occurred later, in the late sixth century onwards. Historians seem to be more confident that early English Christian churches met in private homes, and that some Roman villas also installed places of Christian worship.

Whether the Lucius story is a fiction, or whether there was actually a church deliberately erected over the shrine room is unclear and could only be settled by archaeological exploration under St Peter's. However, it is interesting that whilst four medieval churches were built around the same time on the foundations of the Roman Basilica and forum, the London city authorities in 1417 determined that St Peter's dated back to Roman times, and indeed was the original seat of English Christianity. This suggests there may have been something extra in St Peter's location and longevity which justifies it predating the others.

In 1995, a large and ornate 4th-century church was discovered on Tower Hill, which seems to have mimicked St Ambrose's cathedral in the imperial capital at Milan on a still-larger scale. This possible cathedral was built between 350 and 400 out of stone taken from other buildings, including its veneer of black marble. It is perfectly possible that the stone came from the London basilica and forum, which was demolished and levelled around the same time. The 4th-century church was burnt down in the early 5th century.

According to a 12th-century list, which may be recorded by Jocelyne of Furness, there had been 14 "archbishops" of London, claiming London's Christian community was founded in the 2nd century under the legendary King Lucius and his missionary saints Fagan, Deruvian, Elvanus, and Medwin. None of that is considered credible by modern historians.

Following the establishment of the archdiocese of Canterbury by the Gregorian mission, its leader St Augustine consecrated Mellitus as the first bishop to the Saxon kingdom of Essex in 604. (The first bishop of Rochester was also consecrated the same year.) Bede records that Augustine's patron, King Æthelberht of Kent, built a cathedral for his nephew King Sæberht of Essex as part of this mission. This cathedral was constructed in "London" and dedicated to St Paul. Although it is not clear whether Lundenwic or Lundenburh was intended, it is generally assumed the church was located in the same place occupied by the present St Paul's Cathedral on Ludgate Hill in London. Renaissance rumours that the cathedral had been erected over a Roman temple of the goddess Diana are no longer credited: during his rebuilding of the cathedral following the Great Fire of 1666, Christopher Wren reported discovering no trace of such a structure. Surrey was at times a part of the Kingdom of Essex, and with it the Diocese of London, a situation that changed following a synod at Brentford around 705, reflecting the growing strength of Mercia at the expense of Essex.

Because the bishop's diocese includes the royal palaces and the seat of government at Westminster, they have been regarded as the "King's bishop" and have historically had considerable influence with members of the Royal Family and leading politicians of the day. Since 1748 it has been customary to appoint the Bishop of London to the post of Dean of His Majesty's Chapels Royal, which has the effect of putting under the bishop's jurisdiction, as dean, several chapels (at the Tower of London and St. James's Palace, among others) which are geographically in the Diocese of London but, as royal peculiars, are officially outside the bishop's jurisdiction as bishop.

The Bishop of London originally had responsibility for the church in the British colonies in North America, although after the American Revolution of 1776, all that remained under his jurisdiction were the islands of the British West Indies. The diocese was further reduced in 1846, when the counties of Essex and Hertfordshire were ceded to the Diocese of Rochester.

The Report of the Commissioners appointed by his Majesty to inquire into the Ecclesiastical Revenues of England and Wales (1835), noted the annual net income for the London see was £13,929.

== List of bishops ==
=== Romano-British Bishops ===
The dates and names of these early bishops are very uncertain.

Romano-British Bishops or Archbishops of London – traditional list
From	Until	Incumbent	Notes
186 or unknown	193 or unknown	Thean	Also recorded as Theanus. Credited with foundation of St Peter upon Cornhill.
unknown		Elvanus	Also recorded as Eluanus. A figure from the 12th-century King Lucius legends first attested in the Book of Llandaff; along with St Medwin, said to have been Lucius's messenger to Pope Eleutherius
unknown		Cadar	Also recorded as Cadwr and Cadoc.
unknown		Obinus	
unknown		Conan	Also recorded as Conanus.
unknown		Palludius	Also recorded as Palladius, "bishop of Britain".
unknown		Stephan	Also recorded as Stephanus.
unknown		Iltuta	Also recorded as Iltutus. Conflated with 5th-century St Illtud.
unknown		Dedwin	Also recorded as Theodwin and Theodwinus.
unknown		Thedred	Also recorded as Theodredus.
unknown		Hilary	Also recorded as Hilarius.
fl. 314		Restitutus	Not included in Jocelyn's list, but one of three British bishops recorded attending the 314 Council of Arles. The text is corrupt, but either Restitutus or Adelphius seem to have come from London. None are listed as a metropolitan.
unknown		Guidelinus	Also recorded as Guitelinus, mentioned in Geoffrey of Monmouth's History of the Kings of Britain.
fl. c. 430		Fastidius	Not included in Jocelyn's list; described as "bishop of the Britons" by Gennadius, who credits him with a work on Christian living (De Vita Christiana) and another on pious widowhood (De Virginitate); surviving texts by these names do not match Gennadius's description and seem rather Pelagian, although Gildas apparently quoted them approvingly.
unknown	453 or unknown	Vodinus	Also recorded as Wodinus, said to have been martyred by the Saxons
unknown	c. 586 or unknown	Theanus (II.)	Also recorded as Theonus. Fled into Wales.
According to one source, the last bishop's episcopate ended in 586. But according to another, a century and a half had elapsed between the flight of the last British bishop and the coming of the first Post-Augustinian bishop.

=== Post-Augustinian ===
Post-Augustinian Bishops of London
From	Until	Incumbent	Notes
604	c. 617	Saint Mellitus	Expelled circa 617. Translated to Canterbury in 619.
619	653	See vacant	
c. 653	664	Saint Cedd	Became bishop possibly circa 653. Died in office, possibly on 26 October 664.
664	666	See vacant	
666	c. 672	Wine	Also recorded as Wini. Translated from Winchester. Died in office, possibly before 672.
c. 672	675	See vacant	
c. 675	693	Saint Earconwald	Also recorded as Erconwald, Eorcenwald and Erkenwald. Formerly Abbot of Chertsey Abbey. Became bishop circa 675. Died in office.
693	betw. 705 & 716	Waldhere	Also recorded as Wealdheri. Consecrated in 693 and died sometime between 705 and 716.
betw. 705 & 716	745	Ingwald	Also recorded as Ingweald.
745	betw. 766 & 772	Ecgwulf	Also recorded as Eggwulf.
betw. 766 & 772	betw. 772 & 781	Wigheah	Also recorded as Sighaeh.
betw. 772 & 782	betw. 787 & 789	Eadberht	Also recorded as Eadbert and Eadbeorht.
betw. 787 & 789	betw. 789 & 793	Eadgar	Also recorded as Edgar.
betw. 789 & 793	betw. 793 & 796	Coenwealh	Also recorded as Cenwealh.
betw. 793 & 796	betw. 796 & 798	Eadbald	Also recorded as Eadbeald.
betw. 796 & 798	801	Heathoberht	Also recorded as Heathubeorht.
betw. 801 & 803	betw. 805 & 811	Osmund	Also recorded as Oswynus.
betw. 805 & 811	betw. 816 & 824	Æthelnoth	Also recorded as Æthilnoth.
betw. 816 & 824	betw. 845 & 860	Ceolberht	Also recorded as Coelbeorht.
betw. 845 & 860	betw. 867 & 896	Deorwulf	
betw. 867 & 896	betw. 867 & 896	Swithwulf	
betw. 867 & 896	897	Heahstan	Also recorded as Eadstanus.
betw. 897 & 900	betw. 909 & 926	Wulfsige	
betw. 909 & 926	betw. 909 & 926	Æthelweard	
betw. 909 & 926	betw. 909 & 926	Leofstan	Also recorded as Ealhstan and Elstanus.
betw. 909 & 926	betw. 951 & 953	Theodred	
betw. 951 & 953	betw. 957 & 959	Brihthelm	Also recorded as Beorhthelm.
betw. 957 & 959	959	Dunstan	Translated from Worcester. Translated to Canterbury. After his death he was canonised as Saint Dunstan.
betw. 959 & 964	995 or 996	Ælfstan	
996	1002	Wulfstan	Translated to the sees of York and Worcester in 1002.
betw. 1002 & 1004	betw. 1015 & 1018	Ælfhun	
1014	c. 1035	Ælfwig	Consecrated on 16 February 1014 and acceded to the bishopric sometime between 1015 and 1018. Died in office circa 1035.
1035	1044	Ælfweard	Died in office on 25 or 27 July 1044.
1044	1051	Robert of Jumièges	Previously Abbot of Jumièges Abbey. Appointed bishop in August 1044. Translated to Canterbury in 1051.
early 1051	Sept. 1051	(Spearhafoc)	Previously Abbot of Abingdon. Appointed in early 1051, but never consecrated. Expelled in September 1051, fleeing with gold, gems and other valuable items from the diocesan stores.

=== Post-Conquest ===
Post-Conquest Bishops of London
From	Until	Incumbent	Notes
1051	1075	William the Norman	Consecrated in 1051. Died in office in 1075.
1075	1085	Hugh d'Orevalle	Also recorded as Hugh D'Orival, Hugh de Orwell, and Hugh de Aurea Valle. Elected after 29 August 1075. Died in office on 12 January 1085.
1085	1107	Maurice	Formerly Archdeacon of Le Mans and Lord Chancellor. Nominated or elected on 25 December 1085 and consecrated in 1086, possibly on 5 April. Died in office on 26 September 1107.
1108	1127	Richard de Beaumis I	Elected on 24 May and consecrated on 26 July 1108. Died in office on 16 January 1127. His nephew, Richard de Beaumis II, was Bishop of London 1152–1162.
1127	1134	Gilbert Universalis	Also known as Gilbert the Universal. Formerly a canon of Lyons. Elected circa December 1127 and consecrated on 22 January 1128. Died in office on 9 August 1134.
1134	1136	See vacant	
1136	1138	(Anselm of St Saba)	Nephew of Archbishop Anselm of Canterbury. Benedictine monk, abbot of San Saba and Bury St Edmunds (1121–1148), and papal legate to England. Elected bishop c. 22 March 1136 and enthroned in 1137. However, his election was quashed by Pope Innocent II in 1138.
1138	1141	See vacant	
1141	1150	Robert de Sigello	Formerly a monk of Reading Abbey. Nominated by Empress Matilda in July 1141 and consecrated before April 1142 (probably in July 1141). Died in office on 28 or 29 September 1150.
1150	1152	See vacant	
1152	1162	Richard de Beaumis II	Formerly Archdeacon of Middlesex. Consecrated bishop on 28 September 1152. Died in office on 4 May 1162. His uncle, Richard de Beaumis I, was Bishop of London 1108–1127.
1163	1187	Gilbert Foliot	Translated from Hereford to London on 6 March, confirmed by Pope Alexander III on 19 March, and enthroned on 28 April 1163. Died in office on 18 February 1187
1187	1189	See vacant	
1189	1198	Richard FitzNeal	Also known as Richard FitzNigel. Lord High Treasurer (c.1158–1196) and Dean of Lincoln (1183–1189). Nominated bishop on 15 September and consecrated on 31 December 1189. Died in office on 10 September 1198.
1198	1221	William of Sainte-Mère-Eglise	Also known as William de St Mariæ Ecclesiâ. Formerly a Prebendary of St Paul's, London. Elected after 7 December 1198 and consecrated on 23 May 1199. Resigned on 25 or 26 January 1221. Died on 24 or 27 March 1224.
1221	1228	Eustace of Fauconberg	Formerly a Prebendary of St Paul's, London. Elected on 26 February, received the temporalities on 23 March, and consecrated 25 April 1221. Also Lord High Treasurer (1217–1228). Died in office sometime between 24 and 31 October 1228.
1228	1241	Roger Niger	Formerly Archdeacon of Colchester (1218–1229). Elected in 1228, received the temporalities on 27 April 1229, and consecrated on 10 June 1229. Died on office on 29 September 1241. After his death he was revered as a saint, although there is no formal record of his canonisation.
1241	1259	Fulk Basset	Formerly Dean of York (1239–1241). Elected circa December 1241, received the temporalities on 16 March 1244, and consecrated on 9 October 1244. Died in office on 21 May 1259.
1259	1262	Henry Wingham	Also known as Henry of Wingham. Formerly a Prebendary of St Paul's, London, Dean (Dean of St Martin's le Grand, and Lord Chancellor. Elected before 29 June 1259, received the temporalities on 11 July 1159, and consecrated on 15 February 1260. Died in office on 13 July 1262.
Aug. 1262	Sept. 1262	(Richard Talbot)	Formerly Dean of St Paul's, London. Elected on 18 August 1262, but died unconsecrated on 28 September 1262.
1262	1272	Henry of Sandwich	Formerly a Prebendary of St Paul's, London. Elected on 13 November 1262, received the temporalities on 15 January 1263, and consecrated on 27 May 1263. Died in office on 15 September 1272.
1273	1280	John Chishull	Formerly Lord High Treasurer, Lord Chancellor and Dean of St Paul's, London. Elected on 7 December 1273, received the temporalities on 15 March 1274, and consecrated on 29 April 1274. Died in office on 7 February 1280.
Feb. 1280	Apr. 1280	(Fulke Lovell)	Archdeacon of Colchester (c. 1263–1285) and Prebendary of St Paul's, London. Elected Bishop of London after 18 February, but was never consecrated. Resigned before 8 April 1280.
1280	1303	Richard Gravesend	Formerly a Prebendary of St Paul's, London. Elected before 7 May, received the temporalities on 17 May, and consecrated on 11 August 1280. Died in office on 9 December 1303.
1304	1313	Ralph Baldock	Also known as Ralph de Baldoc. Formerly Dean of St Paul's, London (1294–1306). Elected on 24 February 1304, received the temporalities on 1 June 1304, and consecrated on 30 January 1306. Died in office on 24 July 1313.
1313	1316	Gilbert Segrave	Formerly Precentor of St Paul's, London (c.1306–1316). Elected on 17 August, received the temporalities on 28 September, and consecrated on 25 November 1313. Died in office on 18 December 1316.
1317	1318	Richard Newport	Formerly Dean of St Paul's, London (1316–1317). Elected on 27 January, received the temporalities on 31 March, and consecrated on 15 May 1317. Died in office on 24 August 1318.
1318	1338	Stephen Gravesend	Formerly a Prebendary of St Paul's, London. Elected on 1 September 1318, received the temporalities on 6 November 1318, and consecrated on 14 January 1319. Died in office on 8 April 1338.
1338	1339	Richard de Wentworth	Also known as Richard Bintworth. Formerly a Prebendary of St Paul's, London and Lord Privy Seal (1337–1338). Elected on 4 May, received the temporalities on 24 May, and consecrated on 12 July 1338. Also Lord Chancellor (1338–1339). Died in office on 8 December 1339.
1340	1354	Ralph Stratford	Formerly Treasurer of Salisbury (1336–1340). Elected on 26 January, received the temporalities on 13 February, and consecrated on 12 March 1340. Died in office on 17 April 1354.
1354	1361	Michael Northburgh	Formerly a Prebendary of Lichfield (1342–1354). Elected on 22 April 1354, appointed on 7 May 1354, received the temporalities on 23 June 1354, and consecrated on 12 July 1355. Died in office on 9 September 1361.
1361	1375	Simon Sudbury	Also called Simon Theobald of Sudbury and Simon of Sudbury. Formerly Chancellor of Salisbury (c.1353–1361). Appointed on 22 October 1361, consecrated on 20 March 1362, and received the temporalities on 15 May 1362. Translated to Canterbury on 4 May 1375.
1375	1381	William Courtenay	Translated from Hereford. Appointed on 12 September and received the temporalities on 2 December 1375. Also Lord Chancellor (August–December 1381). Translated to Canterbury on 9 September 1381.
1381	1404	Robert Braybrooke	Formerly Dean of Salisbury (1379–1381). Appointed on 9 September and received the temporalities on 27 December 1381. Consecrated on 5 January 1382. Also Lord Chancellor (1382–1383). Died in office on 28 August 1404.
c. Oct. 1404	c. Dec. 1404	(Thomas Langley)	Keeper of the Privy Seal (1401–1405) and Dean of York (1401–1406). Elected bishop circa October 1404, but his installation was refused by Pope Innocent VII. Afterwards became Lord Chancellor (1405–07 and 1417–24) and Bishop of Durham (1406–1437).
1404	1406	Roger Walden	Previously Archbishop of Canterbury (1398–1399). Appointed on 10 December 1404 and received the temporalities on 28 July 1405. Died in office on 6 January 1406.
1406	1407	Nicholas Bubwith	Also known as Nicholas de Bubbewyth. Formerly Master of the Rolls (1402–1405) and Keeper of the Privy Seal (1405–1406). Appointed on 14 May, consecrated on 26 September, and received the temporalities on 27 September 1406. Also Lord Treasurer (1407–1408). Translated to Salisbury on 22 June 1407.
1407	1421	Richard Clifford	Translated from Worcester. Appointed on 22 June and received the temporalities on 20 October 1407. Died in office on 20 August 1421.
elected 1421		(Thomas Polton)	Bishop of Hereford (1420–1421). Elected Bishop of London in 1421, but was set aside and instead translated to the bishopric of Chichester on 17 November 1421.
1421	1425	John Kemp	Translated from Chichester. Appointed on 17 November 1421 and received the temporalities on 20 June 1422. Translated to York on 20 July 1425.
1425	1431	William Grey	Formerly Dean of York (1420–1425). Appointed on 20 July 1425, elected on 8 April, received the temporalities on 6 May, and consecrated on 26 May 1426. Translated to Lincoln on 30 April 1431.
1431	1436	Robert FitzHugh	Formerly Archdeacon of Northampton (1419–1431) and Chancellor of Cambridge University (1424–1426). Appointed on 20 April, received the temporalities on 4 August, and consecrated on 16 September 1431. Died in office on 15 January 1436.
1436	1448	Robert Gilbert	Formerly Dean of York (1426–1436). Elected bishop on 23 February, appointed on 21 May, received the temporalities on 15 September, and consecrated on 28 October 1436. Died in office before 27 July 1448.
1448	1489	Thomas Kempe	Formerly Archdeacon of Middlesex and Chancellor of York. Appointed on 21 August 1448, received the temporalities on 6 February 1450, and consecrated on 8 February 1450. Died in office on 28 March 1489.
1489	1496	Richard Hill	Formerly Archdeacon of Lewes and Dean of King's Chapel. Appointed on 21 August, received the temporalities on 6 November, and consecrated on 15 November 1489. Died in office on 20 February 1496.
1496	1501	Thomas Savage	Translated from Rochester. Appointed on 3 August and received the temporalities on 2 December 1496. Translated to York before 12 August 1501.
1501	1503	William Warham	Formerly a Prebendary of St Paul's, London. Appointed on 20 October 1501, consecrated on 25 September 1502, received the temporalities on 1 October 1502. Also Keeper of the Great Seal (1502–1504). Translated to Canterbury on 29 November 1503.
1504	1505	William Barons	Formerly Master of the Rolls (1502–1504). Elected bishop before 2 August 1504 and appointed on that date. Received the temporalities on 13 November and consecrated on 26 November 1504. Died in office on 10 October 1505.
1506	1522	Richard FitzJames	Translated from Chichester. Nominated on 24 March, appointed on 5 June, and received the temporalities on 1 August 1506. Died in office before 17 January 1522.
1522	1530	Cuthbert Tunstall	Formerly Dean of Salisbury (1521–1522) and Master of the Rolls (1516–1522). Nominated in January and appointed on 16 May 1522 (again on 10 September 1522). Received the temporalities on 7 October and consecrated on 19 October 1522. Translated to Durham on 21 February 1530.

=== During the Reformation ===
Bishops of London during the Reformation
From	Until	Incumbent	Notes
1530	1539	John Stokesley	Formerly Archdeacon of Dorset (1523–1530). Appointed on 28 March, received the temporalities on 14 July, and consecrated on 27 November 1530. Died in office on 8 September 1539.
1539	1549	Edmund Bonner (1st term)	Formerly Archdeacon of Leicester (1535–1539) and Bishop-elect of Hereford (1538–1539). Elected Bishop of London on 20 October 1539 and consecrated on 4 April 1540. Deprived on 1 October 1549.
1550	1553	Nicholas Ridley	Translated from Rochester. Nominated on 1 April 1550. Styled Bishop of London and Westminster. Deprived in July 1553 and burned at the stake for heresy on 16 October 1555.
1553	1559	Edmund Bonner (2nd term)	Restored on 5 September 1553, but deprived again on 29 May 1559 for refusing to take the Oath of Supremacy. Died in Marshalsea Prison on 6 September 1569.

=== Post-Reformation ===
Post-Reformation Bishops of London
From	Until	Incumbent	Notes
1559	1570	Edmund Grindal	Nominated on 22 June and consecrated on 21 December 1559. Also Master of Pembroke Hall, Cambridge (1559–1561). Translated to York on 22 May 1570.
1570	1577	Edwin Sandys	Translated from Worcester. Nominated on 1 June and confirmed on 13 July 1570. Translated to York on 8 March 1577.
1577	1594	John Aylmer	Formerly Archdeacon of Lincoln (1562–1577). Nominated on 23 February and consecrated on 24 March 1577. Died in office on 5 June 1594.
1594	1596	Richard Fletcher	Translated from Worcester. Nominated on 26 December 1594 and confirmed on 10 January 1595. Died in office on 15 June 1596.
1597	1604	Richard Bancroft	Formerly a canon of Westminster (1592–1597) and Canterbury (1595–1597). Elected on 21 April and consecrated on 8 May 1597. Translated to Canterbury on 10 December 1604.
1604	1607	Richard Vaughan	Translated from Chester. Nominated on 8 December and confirmed on 20 December 1604. Died in office on 30 March 1607.
1607	1609	Thomas Ravis	Translated from Gloucester. Nominated before 14 April and confirmed on 18 May 1607. Died in office on 14 December 1609.
1610	1611	George Abbot	Translated from Lichfield & Coventry. Nominated on 24 December 1609 and confirmed on 20 January 1610. Translated to Canterbury on 9 April 1611.
1611	1621	John King	Formerly Dean of Christ Church, Oxford (1605–1611). Nominated on 30 April and consecrated on 8 September 1611. Died in office on 30 March 1621.
1621	1628	George Montaigne	Translated from Lincoln. Nominated on 26 June and confirmed on 20 July 1621. Translated to Durham after 19 February 1628.
1628	1633	William Laud	Translated from Bath & Wells. Nominated on 4 July and confirmed on 15 July 1628. Also Chancellor of the University of Oxford (1630–1641). Translated to Canterbury on 19 September 1633.
1633	1646	William Juxon	Formerly Bishop-elect of Hereford. Nominated Bishop of London on 23 October and consecrated on 27 October 1633. Also Lord Treasurer (1636–1641). Deprived of the see when the English episcopacy was abolished by Parliament on 9 October 1646. Following the Restoration of the monarchy, Juxon was translated to Canterbury on 20 September 1660.
1646	1660	The see was abolished during the Commonwealth and the Protectorate.	
1660	1663	Gilbert Sheldon	Previously a canon of Gloucester (1633–1658). Nominated on 21 September and consecrated on 28 October 1660. Translated to Canterbury on 31 August 1663.
1663	1675	Humphrey Henchman	Translated from Salisbury. Nominated on 16 June and confirmed on 15 September 1663. Also Lord High Almoner (1662–1675). Died in office on 7 October 1675.
1675	1713	Henry Compton	Translated from Oxford. Nominated on 6 December 1675 and confirmed on 6 February 1676. Died in office on 7 July 1713.
1713	1723	John Robinson	Formerly Dean of the Chapel Royal (1713–1714) .Translated from Bristol. Nominated on 8 August 1713 and confirmed on 13 March 1714. Died in office on 11 April 1723.
1723	1748	Edmund Gibson	Translated from Lincoln. Nominated on 10 April and confirmed on 4 May 1723. Since 1721 also Dean of the Chapel Royal. Died in office on 4 September 1748.
1748	1761	Thomas Sherlock	Translated from Salisbury. Nominated on 12 October and confirmed on 1 December 1748. Died in office on 18 July 1761.
1761	1762	Thomas Hayter	Translated from Norwich. Nominated on 19 September and confirmed on 24 October 1761. Died in office on 9 January 1762.
1762	1764	Richard Osbaldeston	Translated from Carlisle. Nominated on 30 January and confirmed on 18 February 1762. Died in office on 13 May 1764.
1764	1777	Richard Terrick	Translated from Peterborough. Nominated on 22 May and confirmed on 6 June 1764. Died in office on 29 March 1777.
1777	1787	Robert Lowth	Translated from Oxford. Nominated on 12 April 1777 and confirmed on 1 May 1778. Died in office on 3 November 1787.
1787	1809	Beilby Porteus	Translated from Chester. Nominated on 14 November and confirmed on 7 December 1787. Died in office on 13 May 1809.
1809	1813	John Randolph	Translated from Bangor. Nominated on 25 May and confirmed on 9 August 1809. Died in office on 28 July 1813.
1813	1828	William Howley	Nominated on 12 August and confirmed 1 October 1813. Translated to Canterbury on 15 August 1828.
1828	1856	Charles James Blomfield	Translated from Chester. Nominated on 15 August and confirmed on 23 August 1828. Resigned due to ill-health on 30 September 1856 and died on 5 August 1857.
1856	1868	Archibald Campbell Tait	Formerly Dean of Carlisle (1849–1856). Elected bishop on 28 October and consecrated on 23 November 1856. Translated to Canterbury on 30 December 1868.
1869	1885	John Jackson	Translated from Lincoln. Nominated on 11 January and confirmed on 29 January 1869. Died in office on 6 January 1885.
1885	1896	Frederick Temple	Translated from Exeter. Nominated on 26 February and confirmed on 24 March 1885. Translated to Canterbury on 22 December 1896.
1897	1901	Mandell Creighton	Translated from Peterborough. Nominated on 31 December 1896 and confirmed on 15 January 1897. Died in office on 14 January 1901.
1901	1939	Arthur Winnington-Ingram	Translated from Stepney. Nominated on 16 March and confirmed on 17 April 1901. Resigned on 1 September 1939.
1939	1945	Geoffrey Fisher	Translated from Chester. Nominated on 14 September and confirmed on 17 October 1939. Translated to Canterbury on 2 February 1945.
1945	1955	William Wand	Translated from Bath and Wells. Nominated on 10 July and confirmed on 22 August 1945. Resigned in November 1955.
1956	1961	Henry Montgomery Campbell	Translated from Guildford. Nominated on 10 January and confirmed on 25 January 1956. Resigned on 31 July 1961.
1961	1973	Robert Stopford	Translated from Peterborough. Nominated on 4 August and confirmed on 25 September 1961. Resigned on 11 June 1973.
1973	1981	Gerald Ellison	Translated from Chester. Nominated on 18 June and confirmed on 16 July 1973. Resigned on 30 April 1981.
1981	1991	Graham Leonard	Translated from Truro. Nominated on 28 May and confirmed on 21 July 1981. After his resignation in 1991, he became a Roman Catholic priest in 1994.
1991	1995	David Hope	Translated from Wakefield. Nominated and confirmed in 1991. Translated to York in 1995.
1995	2017	Richard Chartres	Translated from Stepney. Elected in October and confirmed in November 1995. Retired on 28 February 2017.
2018	2026	Sarah Mullally	Translated from Crediton. Elected on 25 January 2018, confirmed on 8 March 2018 and installed on 12 May 2018. Former Chief Nursing Officer. Translated to Canterbury on 28 January 2026.

== Assistant bishops ==
Among those who called Assistant Bishop of London, or coadjutor bishop, were:

- 1553–?: Thomas Chetham was consecrated titular bishop of Sidon on 19 January 1526 to serve as an assistant to the Archbishop of Canterbury and became an assistant to the Bishop of London in 1553
- 1554–c. 1558: John Bird, deposed Bishop of Chester was appointed suffragan bishop to the Bishop of London
- Several coadjutor bishops "in Northern and Central Europe", predecessors of the European Bishops of Fulham
- 1897–1910 (d.): Alfred Barry, a Canon of Windsor, Rector of St James's Church, Piccadilly and frequently deputised for the Bishop of Marlborough (until 1900), assistant bishop for West London (effectively acting Bishop of Marlborough; 1900–1903), and former Anglican Bishop of Sydney
- 1916–1933 (d.): Herbert Bury, Bishop in Northern and Central Europe (1911–1926) and incumbent of City churches (1911–d.); former Bishop of British Honduras
- 1962–1966: Ambrose Reeves, former Anglican Bishop of Johannesburg
- 1961–1966: Nathaniel Newnham Davis, Warden of United Westminster Almshouses and former Bishop of Antigua
- 1978 – 1981 (res.): Kenneth Woollcombe, assistant for Westminster and former Bishop of Oxford
- 1976 – 1979 (ret.): Kenneth Howell, Minister of St John's Downshire Hill, Hampstead and former Bishop in Chile, Bolivia and Peru
- 1976 – 1987 (ret.): Edward Knapp-Fisher, Canon and Archdeacon of Westminster, Sub-Dean of Westminster (from 1982) and former Bishop of Pretoria

Honorary assistant bishops – retired bishops taking on occasional duties voluntarily – have included:

- 1929–1934 (d.): William Perrin, Rector of St Andrew Undershaft, bishop for Hampstead deanery and retired Bishop of Willesden
- 1985–1991 (res.), in Kensington area: Alan Rogers, retired Bishop of Edmonton

== Bibliography ==
- Clark, John (1996). "The Temple of Diana". In Bird, Joanna; Hassall, Mark; Sheldon, Harvey (eds.). Interpreting Roman London. Oxbow Monograph. Vol. 58. Oxford: Oxbow. pp. 1–9.
- Fryde, E.B.; Greenway, D.E.; Porter, S.; Roy, I., eds. (2003) [1986]. Handbook of British Chronology (3rd ed.). Cambridge: Cambridge University Press. ISBN 0-521-56350-X.
- Greenway, D.E. (1968). St. Paul's, London. Fasti Ecclesiae Anglicanae 1066–1300. Vol. 1. London: Institute of Historical Research – via British History Online.
- Horn, J.M. (1963). St Paul's, London. Fasti Ecclesiae Anglicanae 1300–1541. Vol. 5. London: Institute of Historical Research – via British History Online.
- Horn, J. M. (1969). St. Paul's, London. Fasti Ecclesiae Anglicanae 1541–1857. Vol. 1. London: Institute of Historical Research – via British History Online.
- Labbé, Philippe; Cossart, Gabriel, eds. (1671). Sacrosancta Concilia ad Regiam Editionem Exacta: quae Nunc Quarta Parte Prodit Actior [The Sancrosanct Councils Exacted for the Royal Edition: which the Editors Now Produce in Four Parts] (in Latin). Vol. 1. Paris: Lutetiae Parisiorum: Impensis Societatis typographicae librorum ecclesiasticorum jussu regis constitutae. Column 1430, Item de Galliis.
- Noorthouck, John (1773). A New History of London – Including Westminster and Southwark. British History Online.
- Stowe, John (1605). The Annales of England. London: G. Bishop & T. Adams. p. 37.
- Thackeray, Francis (1843). Researches into the ecclesiastical and political state of Ancient Britain under the Roman Emperors, with observations upon the principal events and characters connected with the Christian religion during the first five centuries (in Latin and English). Vol. 1. London: Thomas Cadell, Strand. p. 275.
