= Ealhstan =

Ealhstan may refer to

- Leofstan, bishop of London in the early tenth century
- Eahlstan, bishop of Sherborne in the mid ninth century
