= Hoxne Bishopric =

Hoxne Bishopric was an episcopal see founded in the late ninth century in Hoxne, Suffolk. Following the incursion of the Viking Great Heathen Army, and the death of the Anglo-Saxon King Edmund the Martyr in 869, the previous religious institutions of the Christian Anglo-Saxons were disrupted. However Alfred the Great won a decisive victory over the Vikings at the Battle of Edington in 878, and obliged their leader Guthrum to convert to Christianity. When Guthrum died in 890 East Anglia was still riven with conflict. However, Theodred, who was Bishop of London for several years before his death around 950, referred to the "Bishopric in Hoxne" in his will. This based around a minster – a term having particular use by the late Anglo-Saxon church – a church dedicated to St Ethelbert, a King of East Anglia, murdered in 794 by Offa near Hereford. The archaeologist Lawrence Butler commented on the 11 dedications to St Ethelbert in East Anglia suggesting a difficulty in determining to what extent "these represent a genuine and immediate honouring of a revered king, before the death of Edmund in 869 gave another candidate." Indeed, in 950 Hoxne Priory was founded as a religious house on the supposed site of the martyrdom of King Edmund. Andrew Gourlay has suggested that considering the parallels between St. Ethelbert’s and that of St Edmund, the narratives of the two kingly saints may have become conflated.
