= Eadberht =

Eadberht is an Anglo-Saxon male name. It may refer to:

- Eadberht of Lindisfarne (died 698), Bishop of Lindisfarne
- Eadberht of Northumbria (died 768), King of Northumbria
- Eadberht of Selsey (died c. 716), Abbot of Selsey Abbey and first bishop of Selsey
- Eadbert I of Kent (died 748), King of Kent
- Eadberht II, 8th century joint King of Kent
- Eadberht III Præn, King of Kent from 796 to 798
- Eadberht (bishop of London) (died between 787 and 789)
- Eadberht of Lichfield (died after 875), Bishop of Lichfield or perhaps of Lindsey
