= Beorhthelm =

Beorhthelm (also Brihthelm, Brithelm, Brithelmus, Birthelm, Birhelm, Byrhthelm, Bertelin, Bettelin, or Bertram) is an Anglo-Saxon male given name.

== Bishops ==
- Beorhthelm of Winchester, Bishop of Winchester c. 960
- Brihthelm (bishop of London) (died between 957 and 959)
- Brihthelm (Bishop of Selsey) (died between 956 and 963)
- Byrhthelm (bishop of Wells) (died 973), and briefly Archbishop of Canterbury

== Saints ==
- Beorhthelm of Stafford, patron saint of Stafford
- Beorhthelm of Shaftesbury, a 10th-century Anglo-Saxon saint

== See also ==
- "The Homecoming of Beorhtnoth Beorhthelm's Son", a 1953 play by J. R. R. Tolkien
