= Waldhere =

Waldhere, Wealdhere or Waldere can refer to:

- Waldere, Old English epic poem surviving only in fragments
- Waldhere (Bishop of London), early 8th-century bishop of London
