= Richard Talbot (bishop of London) =

13th-century Bishop of London

- Bishop of London-elect
- Elected: 18 August 1262
- Term ended: September 1262
- Predecessor: Henry Wingham
- Successor: Henry of Sandwich
- Other post: Dean of St Paul's

Orders
- Consecration: never consecrated

Personal details
- Died: September 1262
- Denomination: Roman Catholic

Richard Talbot (died 1262) was a medieval Bishop of London-elect.

== Life ==
Talbot was the nephew of Fulk Basset, Bishop of London. He held the prebends of Mora and Finsbury in the diocese of London before being named treasurer of the diocese by 20 August 1257. He was Dean of St Paul's in London by 26 January 1262. He was elected bishop on 18 August 1262 and that election was confirmed by the archbishop; but Talbot died on either 28 September or 29 September 1262 before he could be consecrated.

== Citations ==
Catholic Church titles
Preceded by Henry Wingham	Bishop of London; 1262	Succeeded by Henry of Sandwich
