= Theodred (bishop of London) =

10th-century Bishop of London

- Bishop of London
- Appointed: between 909 and 926
- Term ended: between 951 and 953
- Predecessor: Leofstan
- Successor: Brihthelm

Orders
- Consecration: between 909 and 926

Personal details
- Died: between 951 and 953
- Denomination: Christian

Theodred was a medieval Bishop of London.

Theodred was consecrated between 909 and 926, probably in 926. He may have been German and was a patron of German clerics, several of whom were beneficiaries of his will. He was close to king Æthelstan throughout his reign, and is reported to have been present at the Battle of Brunanburh in 937. He took messages from the king to his councillors, and is said to have bought relics in Pavia.

Theodred died between 951 and 953. In his will he referred to a Hoxne Bishopric as an episcopal see founded in the late ninth century.

== Citations ==
Christian titles
Preceded by Leofstan	Bishop of London c. 915–c. 952	Succeeded by Brihthelm
