= Wulfsige of London =

9th and 10th-century Bishop of London

Wulfsige
- Bishop of London
- Appointed: between 897 and 900
- Term ended: between 909 and 926
- Predecessor: Heahstan
- Successor: Æthelweard

Orders
- Consecration: between 897 and 900

Personal details
- Died: between 909 and 926
- Denomination: Christian

Wulfsige was a medieval Bishop of London.

Wulfsige was consecrated between 897 and 900. He died between 909 and 926.

== Citations ==
Christian titles
Preceded by Heahstan	Bishop of London c. 898–c. 915	Succeeded by Æthelweard
