= William the Norman =

11th-century Bishop of London

William
- Bishop of London
- Appointed: 1051
- Term ended: 1075
- Predecessor: Spearhafoc
- Successor: Hugh d'Orevalle

Orders
- Ordination: by Robert of Jumièges
- Consecration: 1051

Personal details
- Died: 1075
- Denomination: Catholic

William the Norman (died 1075) was a medieval Bishop of London.

William was consecrated in 1051. He, along with Ralf the Staller and a royal priest, supervised the submission of the English in East Anglia soon after the Norman Conquest in 1066. He attended the Council of London in 1075. He died in 1075.

== Citations ==
Catholic Church titles
Preceded by Spearhafoc	Bishop of London; 1051–1075	Succeeded by Hugh d'Orevalle
