= Osmund (bishop of London) =

9th-century Bishop of London

- Bishop of London
- Appointed: between 801 and 803
- Term ended: between 805 and 811
- Predecessor: Heathoberht
- Successor: Æthelnoth

Orders
- Consecration: between 801 and 803

Personal details
- Died: between 805 and 811
- Denomination: Christian

Osmund or Oswynus (died between 805 and 811) was a medieval Bishop of London.

Osmund was consecrated between 801 and 803 and died between 805 and 811.

== Citations ==
Christian titles
| Preceded by Heathoberht | Bishop of London c. 802–c. 808 | Succeeded by Æthelnoth |
