= John Chishull =

13th-century Bishop of London, Chancellor of England, and Treasurer of England

- Bishop of London
- Elected: 7 December 1273
- Term ended: 7 February 1280
- Predecessor: Henry of Sandwich
- Successor: Fulke Lovell
- Other post: Dean of St Paul's

Orders
- Consecration: 29 April 1274 by Bishop Godfrey Giffard, with co-consecrator Bishop Anian Schonaw, O.P.

Personal details
- Died: 7 February 1280
- Denomination: Catholic

Lord High Treasurer
- In office 1263
- Monarch: Henry III
- Preceded by: Henry
- Succeeded by: Roger de la Leye

Lord Chancellor
- In office 1263–1264
- Monarch: Henry III
- Preceded by: Nicholas of Ely
- Succeeded by: Thomas Cantilupe

Lord Chancellor
- In office 1268–1269
- Monarch: Henry III
- Preceded by: Godfrey Giffard
- Succeeded by: Richard Middleton

Lord High Treasurer
- In office 1270–1271
- Monarch: Henry III
- Preceded by: Thomas Wymondham
- Succeeded by: Philip of Eye

John Chishull or John de Chishull (died 1280) was Lord Chancellor of England, Bishop of London, and Lord High Treasurer during the 13th century. He also served as Dean of St Paul's.

== Life ==
Chishull was made rector of St Mary's Church, the parish church of Broadwater in Sussex (now part of the town of Worthing) in 1259.

Appointed as a King's Clerk in 1251, he was selected as Chancellor of the Exchequer in November 1263 and served until 25 February 1264. He also served as acting treasurer in November 1263. On 30 October 1268 he was reappointed Chancellor, serving until 29 July 1269. On 6 February 1270 he was appointed Treasurer and served in that office until 9 June 1271.

Chishull held the prebend of Chamberlainwood in the diocese of London before he had the office of Archdeacon of London. He was archdeacon by 15 January 1263. He was then appointed Provost of Beverley Minster from 1265 to 1274 and Dean of St Paul's in London between August and October 1268.

Chishull was elected bishop on 7 December 1273, confirmed 15 March, and consecrated on 29 April 1274.

Chishull died on 7 February 1280. There was a tomb memorial to him in the quire at Old St Paul's Cathedral.

== Citations ==
Political offices
Preceded by Henry	Lord High Treasurer; 1263	Succeeded by Roger de la Leye
Preceded by Nicholas of Ely	Lord Chancellor; 1263–1264	Succeeded by Thomas Cantilupe
Preceded by Godfrey Giffard	Lord Chancellor; 1268–1269	Succeeded by Richard Middleton
Preceded by Thomas Wymondham	Lord High Treasurer; 1270–1271	Succeeded by Philip of Eye
Catholic Church titles
Preceded by Henry of Sandwich	Bishop of London; 1274–1280	Succeeded by Fulke Lovell
