= Fulk Basset (bishop of London) =

13th-century Bishop of London

- Bishop of London
- Elected: 1241
- Term ended: 21 May 1259
- Predecessor: Roger Niger
- Successor: Henry Wingham

Orders
- Consecration: 9 October 1244

Personal details
- Died: 21 May 1259
- Buried: 25 May 1259
- Denomination: Catholic

Fulk Basset (died 1259) was a medieval Bishop of London.

== Biography ==
Basset was a younger son of Alan Basset, of High Wycombe in Buckinghamshire. He became Dean of York in 1239, then was elected as Bishop of London in 1241, probably in December. His election was confirmed by the archbishop on 23 January 1244 and he was consecrated on 9 October of that year. He was present at the Council of Oxford and was a principal ally of Henry III. Fulk and Philip Basset were cousins to William de Montacute, the ancestor of the House of Montagu who attested many of their charters.

On the death of his brother Gilbert in 1241, Basset inherited estates including the manors of Berwick and Marden, both in Wiltshire.

Basset died on 21 May 1259. His death was commemorated on that day, and he was buried on 25 May.

Basset's nephew, Richard Talbot, was elected Bishop of London in 1262, but died before he could be consecrated.

== Citations ==
Catholic Church titles
Preceded by Roger Niger	Bishop of London; 1244–1259	Succeeded by Henry Wingham
