= Richard Gravesend =

13th and 14th-century Bishop of London

- Bishop of London
- Elected: about 7 May 1280
- Installed: 1 October 1280
- Term ended: 9 December 1303
- Predecessor: Fulke Lovell
- Successor: Ralph Baldock
- Other post: Prebendary of Totenhall

Orders
- Consecration: 11 August 1280

Personal details
- Died: 9 December 1303
- Denomination: Roman Catholic

Ordination history of Richard Gravesend
History
Episcopal consecration
- Principal consecrator: Archbishop John Peckham, O.F.M.
- Co-consecrators: ??????????
Episcopal succession
Bishops consecrated by Richard Gravesend as principal consecrator
- Peter Wyvill: 10 November 1280
- William of March: 17 May 1293
- Leoline Bromfield: 17 May 1293

Richard Gravesend (died 1303) was a medieval Bishop of London.

== Life ==
Gravesend held the prebend of Totenhall in the diocese of London. He may have been Archdeacon of Essex and possibly Archdeacon of Northampton, but the identifications are not secure.

Gravesend was elected about 7 May, confirmed 17 May and consecrated on 11 August 1280. He was enthroned in London on 1 October 1280.

Gravesend died on 9 December 1303.

== Citations ==
Catholic Church titles
Preceded by Fulke Lovell	Bishop of London; 1280–1303	Succeeded by Ralph Baldock
