= Maurice (bishop of London) =

11th and 12th-century Bishop of London

- Bishop of London
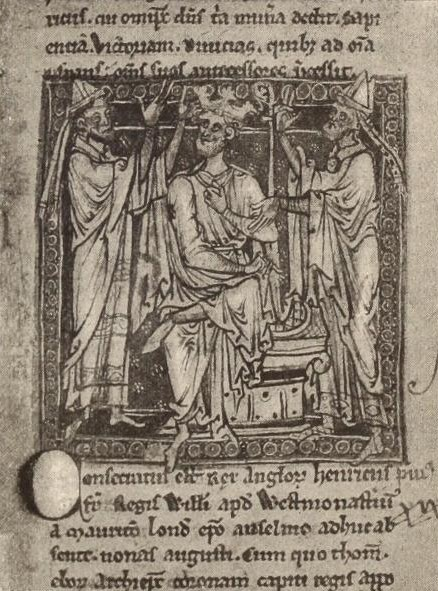
- Coronation of Henry I by Maurice, bishop of London (in the absence of Anselm) and Thomas, archbishop of York (Chronica Majora)
- Appointed: 25 December 1085
- Term ended: 26 September 1107
- Predecessor: Hugh d'Orevalle
- Successor: Richard de Beaumis
- Other post: Archdeacon of Le Mans

Orders
- Consecration: 5 April 1086 by Lanfranc

Personal details
- Died: 26 September 1107
- Denomination: Roman Catholic

Lord Chancellor
- In office 1078–c. 1085
- Monarch: William I
- Preceded by: Osmund
- Succeeded by: Gerard

Maurice (died 1107) was a Norman cleric and bureaucrat who served as the third Lord Chancellor, as well as Bishop of London.

== Life ==
Maurice was Archdeacon of Le Mans before being named Chancellor in about 1078. He held the office until sometime between 1085 or 1086. He was nominated to the see of London on 25 December 1085 and consecrated in 1086, possibly on 5 April. He died on 26 September 1107 with his death being commemorated on 26 September.

In 1087, after a widespread fire, Maurice began rebuilding St Paul's Cathedral, possibly separate from the Anglo-Saxon church. In 1109 the cathedral was used for the consecration of the new archbishop of York, but it was probably not finished until about 1190. It was then one of the largest buildings in medieval England.

== Citations ==
Political offices
Preceded by Osmund	Lord Chancellor; 1078 – c. 1085	Succeeded by Gerard
Catholic Church titles
Preceded by Hugh d'Orevalle	Bishop of London; 1085–1107	Succeeded by Richard de Beaumis
