= Deorwulf =

9th-century Bishop of London

- Bishop of London
- Appointed: between 845 and 860
- Term ended: between 867 and 896
- Predecessor: Ceolberht
- Successor: Swithwulf

Orders
- Consecration: between 845 and 860

Personal details
- Died: between 867 and 896
- Denomination: Christian

Deorwulf (died between 867 and 896) was a medieval Bishop of London. Deorwulf was consecrated between 845 and 860. He died between 867 and 896.

== Citations ==
Christian titles
Preceded by Ceolberht	Bishop of London c. 853–c. 883	Succeeded by Swithwulf
