= Henry of Sandwich =

13th-century Bishop of London

- Bishop of London
- Elected: 13 November 1262
- Term ended: 15 September 1273
- Predecessor: Richard Talbot
- Successor: John Chishull
- Previous post: Prebendary of Weldland

Orders
- Consecration: 27 May 1263

Personal details
- Died: 15 September 1273
- Denomination: Roman Catholic

Henry of Sandwich (died 1273) was a medieval Bishop of London.

== Life ==
Henry was the son of Henry of Sandwich, a knight from Sandwich, Kent. He held the prebend of Weldland in the diocese of London.

Henry was Archdeacon of Oxford from 1259 to 1262. He was elected Bishop of London on 13 November 1262, confirmed 21 December and consecrated on 27 May 1263. He was suspended from office on 1 December 1265 but was reinstated by Pope Gregory X on 31 May 1272. He returned to England from exile on 31 January 1273.

Henry died on 15 September 1273. After his death, his nephew Sir Ralph de Sandwich was made administrator of the See of London, having already acted as their administrator during Henry's exile in Rome.

== Citations ==
Catholic Church titles
Preceded by Richard Talbot	Bishop of London; 1262–1273	Succeeded by John Chishull
