= Ecgwulf =

8th-century Bishop of London

- Bishop of London
- Appointed: 745
- Term ended: between 766 and 772
- Predecessor: Ingwald
- Successor: Wigheah

Orders
- Consecration: 745

Personal details
- Died: between 766 and 772
- Denomination: Christian

Ecgwulf (or Eggwulf; died between 766 and 772) was a medieval Bishop of London.

Ecgwulf was consecrated in 745. He died between 766 and 772.

== Citations ==
Christian titles
Preceded by Ingwald	Bishop of London; 745–c. 769	Succeeded by Wigheah
