= Henry Wingham =

13th-century Bishop of London and Chancellor of England

- Bishop of London
- Elected: about 29 June 1259
- Term ended: 13 July 1262
- Predecessor: Fulk Basset
- Successor: Richard Talbot
- Other post: Dean of St Martin le Grand

Orders
- Consecration: 15 February 1260

Personal details
- Died: 13 July 1262
- Buried: before 16 July 1262
- Denomination: Roman Catholic

Lord Chancellor
- In office 1255–1260
- Monarch: Henry III of England
- Preceded by: William of Kilkenny
- Succeeded by: Nicholas of Ely

Henry Wingham (died 1262) was a Lord Chancellor of England and Bishop of London.

== Life ==
Wingham was selected as Chancellor on 5 January 1255. His office was renewed by the baronial reformers in 1258, but he was replaced on 18 October 1260 by Nicholas of Ely. He held the prebend of Newington in the diocese of London as well as being a member of the papal chapel and the dean of St Martin le Grand.

Wingham was elected to the see of London about 29 June 1259, confirmed 11 July 1259, and consecrated on 15 February 1260.

Wingham died on 13 July 1262 or 14 July 1262. There was a tomb memorial to him in the quire at Old St Paul's Cathedral.

== Citations ==
Political offices
Preceded by William of Kilkenny	Lord Chancellor; 1255–1260	Succeeded by Nicholas of Ely
Catholic Church titles
Preceded by Fulk Basset	Bishop of London; 1259–1262	Succeeded by Richard Talbot
