= Heahstan =

9th-century Bishop of London

- Bishop of London
- Appointed: between 867 and 896
- Term ended: 897
- Predecessor: Swithwulf
- Successor: Wulfsige

Orders
- Consecration: between 867 and 896

Personal details
- Died: 897
- Denomination: Christian

Heahstan (or Eadstanus; died 897) was a medieval Bishop of London.

Heahstan was consecrated between 867 and 896. He died in 897.

== Citations ==
Christian titles
Preceded by Swithwulf	Bishop of London c. 885–897	Succeeded by Wulfsige
