= Hugh d'Orevalle =

11th-century Bishop of London

- Bishop of London
- Elected: after 29 August 1075
- Term ended: either 1084 or 1085
- Predecessor: William
- Successor: Maurice

Orders
- Ordination: 1075 by Lanfranc

Personal details
- Died: 1084 or 1085
- Denomination: Catholic

Hugh d'Orevalle (Note: Or Hugh D'Orival or Hugh de Aurea Valle or Hugh de Orwell) (died either 1084 or 1085) was a medieval Bishop of London.

From a family originating in the village of Orival (Aurea Valle) in Normandy, he was elected after 29 August 1075. He died in 1084 or 1085, with his death being commemorated on 12 January — his death year is recorded as 1084 Old Style (i.e. 25 March 1084 – 24 March 1085), so he may very well have died 12 January 1085 (New Style).

== Citations ==
Catholic Church titles
Preceded by William	Bishop of London; 1075–1085	Succeeded by Maurice
