= Richard Middleton (Lord Chancellor) =

13th-century English clergyman and Chancellor of England

- Archdeacon of Northumberland
- Province: Durham
- Appointed: before 23 September 1271
- Term ended: before 7 August 1272
- Predecessor: Roger de Herteburn
- Successor: Thomas de Birland
- Other post: Lord Chancellor

Personal details
- Died: 7 August 1272

Lord Chancellor
- In office 29 July 1269 – before 7 August 1272
- Monarchs: Henry III, Edward I
- Preceded by: John Chishull
- Succeeded by: Walter de Merton

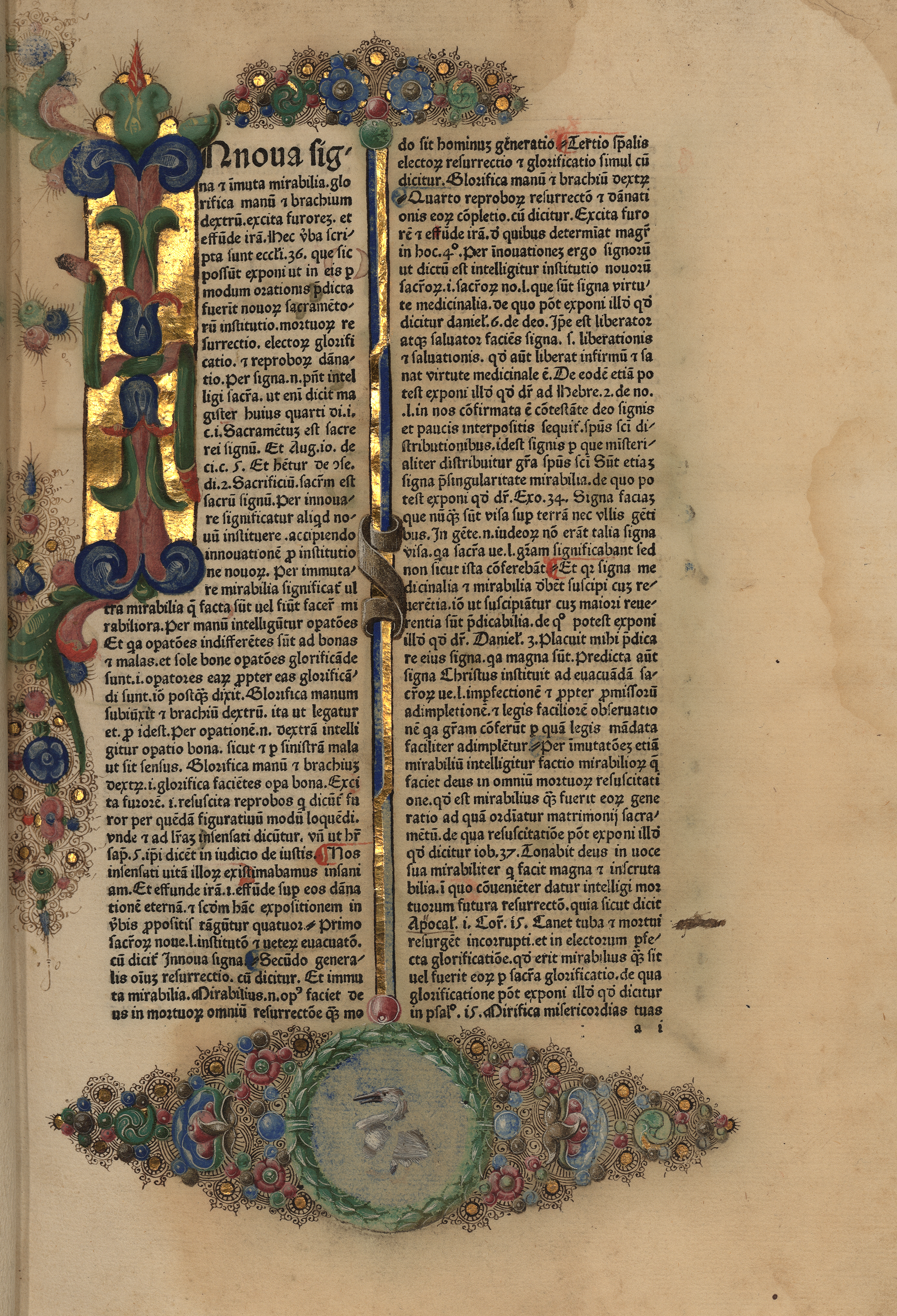
Commentary on the fourth book of the Sentences of Peter Lombard, written in Latin by Richard Middleton

Richard Middleton (sometimes Richard of Middleton or Richard de Middleton; died 7 August 1272) was an English ecclesiastic and Lord Chancellor of England.

Middleton was appointed Lord Chancellor on 29 July 1269. He was out of office before his death, but his successor Walter de Merton is first mentioned in the office on 29 November 1272.

On 5 January 1270 Middleton was given the living of the church at Hemingbrough in the East Riding of Yorkshire by the cathedral chapter of Durham Cathedral. He was also Archdeacon of Northumberland, occurring in that office on 23 September 1271 and in 1272.

Middleton died on 7 August 1272. He had a son, Gilbert, who was dead by 1291, and a grandson, also named Gilbert, who was executed for treason in 1318.
