= Ceolberht =

9th-century Bishop of London

Coelberht
- Bishop of London
- Appointed: between 816 and 824
- Term ended: between 845 and 869
- Predecessor: Æthelnoth
- Successor: Deorwulf

Orders
- Consecration: between 816 and 824

Personal details
- Died: between 845 and 860
- Denomination: Christian

Ceolberht (or Coelbeorht; died between 845 and 869) was a medieval Bishop of London.

Ceolberht was consecrated between 816 and 824. He died between 845 and 869.

== Citations ==
Christian titles
Preceded by Æthelnoth	Bishop of London c. 820–c. 853	Succeeded by Deorwulf
