= Swithwulf (bishop of London) =

9th-century Bishop of London

- Bishop of London
- Appointed: between 867 and 896
- Term ended: between 867 and 896
- Predecessor: Deorwulf
- Successor: Heahstan

Orders
- Consecration: between 867 and 896

Personal details
- Died: between 867 and 896
- Denomination: Christian

Swithwulf (died between 867 and 896) was a medieval Bishop of London.

Swithwulf was consecrated between 867 and 896. He died between 867 and 896.

== Citations ==
Christian titles
Preceded by Deorwulf	Bishop of London c. 883	Succeeded by Heahstan
