= Fulke Lovell =

13th-century Bishop of London-elect

- Bishop of London-elect
- Elected: 18 February 1280
- Term ended: resigned before 8 April 1280
- Predecessor: John Chishull
- Successor: Richard Gravesend
- Other post: Archdeacon of Colchester

Orders
- Consecration: never consecrated

Personal details
- Died: 21 November 1285
- Denomination: Catholic

Fulke Lovell (or Fulk Lovel; died 1285) was a medieval Bishop of London-elect.

Lovell held the prebends of Islington and Caddington Major in the diocese of London before he became Archdeacon of Colchester between 1263 and 1267. He was elected bishop on 18 February 1280 but resigned the election before 8 April 1280. He died on 21 November 1285 while holding the office of archdeacon.

== Citations ==
Catholic Church titles
Preceded by John Chishull	Bishop of London refused office 1280	Succeeded by Richard Gravesend
