= Ingwald =

8th-century Bishop of London

- Bishop of London
- Appointed: between 705 and 716
- Term ended: 745
- Predecessor: Waldhere
- Successor: Ecgwulf

Personal details
- Died: 745
- Denomination: Christian

Ingwald (or Ingweald; died 745) was a medieval Bishop of London in England.

Ingwald was consecrated between 705 and 716. He died in 745.

== Citations ==
Christian titles
Preceded by Waldhere	Bishop of London c. 711–745	Succeeded by Ecgwulf
