= Eadsige =

Archbishop of Canterbury from 1038 to 1050

Saint Eadsige OSB
- Archbishop of Canterbury
- Appointed: 1038
- Term ended: 28 October 1050
- Predecessor: Æthelnoth
- Successor: Robert of Jumièges

Orders
- Consecration: 1038

Personal details
- Died: 29 October 1050

Sainthood
- Feast day: 28 October
- Venerated in: Anglican Communion; Roman Catholic Church; Eastern Orthodox Church

Eadsige (Note: Also Edsige, Eadsimus, or Eadsin) (died 29 October 1050), was Archbishop of Canterbury from 1038 to 1050. He crowned Edward the Confessor as king of England in 1043.

== Early career ==
Eadsige was a royal priest for King Cnut before Cnut arranged for him to become a monk at Christ Church, Canterbury about 1030. About 1035, he served as a suffragan or coadjutor bishop to Archbishop Æthelnoth of Canterbury, with his see located at the church of St Martin in Canterbury. He was translated to the Archbishopric of Canterbury in 1038 after Æthelnoth's death. In 1040, he journeyed to Rome to receive his pallium from Pope Benedict IX.

== Archbishop ==
Eadsige may have crowned Harthacnut in 1040, but he definitely crowned Edward the Confessor on 3 April 1043 along with Ælfric Puttoc, the Archbishop of York. In 1044, Eadsige, wishing to withdraw from his see because of ill-health, appears to have approached King Edward and Godwin, Earl of Wessex, about temporarily consecrating Siward, abbot of Abingdon in Eadsige's place. This retirement lasted until 1048, when Siward became ill and returned to Abingdon to die within eight weeks. While he was archbishop, he also was sheriff of Kent. William of Malmesbury relates a story that Siward deprived Eadsige of food during Eadsige's illness and because of this Siward was not allowed to succeed Eadsige, but had to settle for the see of Rochester instead. However, this probably is a fabrication to account for the fact that Siward did not become archbishop after Eadsige, for William had confused Siward, the abbot, with a different Siward, this one Siward of Rochester, who was Bishop of Rochester from 1058 to 1075. The see of Worcester preserved a tradition that in about 1047 it was Eadsige, along with Lyfing the Bishop of Worcester, who forced Sweyn Godwinson to give up his wife who had been the abbess of Leominster Abbey before Sweyn abducted her.

== Death and legacy ==
Eadsige died on 29 October 1050 or possibly just sometime in October 1050. During his occupation of the see, many of the lands of the see were either leased, sold or given to Godwin, Earl of Wessex, an action that angered the monks of the cathedral, and may have contributed to William of Malmesbury's dislike of the archbishop and willingness to fabricate a story about him being mistreated.

Eadsige is considered a saint, with his feast day on 28 October.

== Citations ==
Christian titles
Preceded by Æthelnoth	Archbishop of Canterbury; 1038–1050	Succeeded by Robert of Jumièges
