= Eadgar of London =

8th-century Bishop of London

Eadgar
- Bishop of London
- Appointed: between 787 and 789
- Term ended: between 789 and 793
- Predecessor: Eadberht
- Successor: Ceonwalh

Orders
- Consecration: between 787 and 789

Personal details
- Died: between 789 and 793
- Denomination: Christian

Eadgar (or Edgar; died between 789 and 793) was a medieval Bishop of London.

Eadgar was consecrated between 787 and 789. He died between 789 and 793.

== Citations ==
Christian titles
Preceded by Eadberht	Bishop of London c. 788–c. 791	Succeeded by Ceonwalh
