= Heathoberht =

8th-century Bishop of London

- Bishop of London
- Appointed: between 796 and 798
- Term ended: 801
- Predecessor: Eadbald
- Successor: Osmund

Orders
- Consecration: between 796 and 798

Personal details
- Died: 801
- Denomination: Christian

Heathoberht (also Heathubeorht or Hathoberht) (died 801) was a medieval Bishop of London.

Heathoberht was consecrated between 796 and 798. He died in 801.

== Citations ==
Christian titles
Preceded by Eadbald	Bishop of London c. 797–801	Succeeded by Osmund
