= Wigheah =

8th-century Bishop of London

Wighedus
- Bishop of London
- Appointed: between 766 and 772
- Term ended: between 772 and 781
- Predecessor: Ecgwulf
- Successor: Eadberht

Orders
- Consecration: between 766 and 772

Personal details
- Died: between 772 and 781
- Denomination: Christian

Wigheah (or Sighaeh; died between 772 and 781) was a medieval Bishop of London.

Wigheah was consecrated between 766 and 772. He died between 772 and 781.

== Citations ==
Christian titles
Preceded by Ecgwulf	Bishop of London c. 769–c. 776	Succeeded by Eadberht
