= Eadbald (bishop of London) =

8th-century Bishop of London

- Bishop of London
- A mention of Eadbald in the Anglo-Saxon Chronicle
- Appointed: between 793 and 796
- Term ended: between 796 and 798
- Predecessor: Coenwalh
- Successor: Heathoberht

Orders
- Consecration: between 793 and 796

Personal details
- Died: between 796 and 798
- Denomination: Christian

Eadbald (or Eadbeald; died between 796 and 798) was a medieval Bishop of London.

Eadbald was consecrated between 793 and 796. He died between 796 and 798.

== Citations ==
Christian titles
Preceded by Coenwalh	Bishop of London c. 795–c. 797	Succeeded by Heathoberht
