= Eanbald =

Eanbald may refer to:

- Eanbald (died 796), Archbishop of York
- Eanbald (floruit 798), also Archbishop of York (died 808); also known as Eanbald II
