= Æthelweard of London =

10th-century Bishop of London

Æthelweard
- Bishop of London
- Appointed: between 909 and 926
- Term ended: between 909 and 926
- Predecessor: Wulfsige
- Successor: Leofstan

Orders
- Consecration: between 909 and 926

Personal details
- Died: between 909 and 926
- Denomination: Christian

Æthelweard (died between 909 and 926) was a medieval Bishop of London.

Æthelweard was consecrated between 909 and 926. He died between 909 and 926.

== Citations ==
Christian titles
Preceded by Wulfsige	Bishop of London c. 915	Succeeded by Leofstan
