= Waldhere (bishop) =

7th and 8th-century Bishop of London

- Bishop of London
- Appointed: 693
- Term ended: between 705 and 716
- Predecessor: Erkenwald
- Successor: Ingwald

Orders
- Consecration: 693

Personal details
- Died: between 705 and 716
- Denomination: Christian

Waldhere (or Wealdheri; died between 705 and 716) was an early medieval Bishop of London, England.

Waldhere was consecrated in 693. He died between 705 and 716. A letter of his, written about 704 to Archbishop Bertwald of Canterbury still survives, and discusses the tension between King Ine of Wessex and the joint kings of Essex, Sigeheard and Swaefred. The letter has been described by Sir Frank Stenton as 'the first letter known to have been written from one English-man to another'.

== Citations ==
Christian titles
Preceded by Erkenwald	Bishop of London; 693–c. 711	Succeeded by Ingwald
