= Brihthelm (bishop of London) =

10th-century Bishop of London

- Bishop of London
- Appointed: between 951 and 953
- Term ended: between 957 and 959
- Predecessor: Theodred
- Successor: Dunstan

Orders
- Consecration: between 951 and 953

Personal details
- Died: between 957 and 959
- Denomination: Christian

Brihthelm or Beorhthelm (died between 957 and 959) was a medieval Bishop of London.

Brihthelm was consecrated between 951 and 953 and he died between 957 and 959.

== Citations ==
Christian titles
Preceded by Theodred	Bishop of London c. 952-c. 958	Succeeded by Dunstan
