= Coenwalh (bishop) =

8th-century Bishop of London

- Bishop of London
- Appointed: between 789 and 793
- Term ended: between 793 and 796
- Predecessor: Eadgar
- Successor: Eadbald

Orders
- Consecration: between 789 and 793

Personal details
- Died: between 793 and 796
- Denomination: Christian

Coenwalh (or Cenwealh; died between 793 and 796) was a medieval Bishop of London.

Coenwalh was consecrated between 789 and 793. He died between 793 and 796.

== Citations ==
Christian titles
Preceded by Eadgar	Bishop of London c. 791–c. 794	Succeeded by Eadbald
