= Æthelnoth (archbishop of Canterbury) =

Archbishop of Canterbury from 1020 to 1038, Catholic saint

Saint Æthelnoth
- Archbishop of Canterbury
- Appointed: 1020
- Term ended: 1038
- Predecessor: Lyfing
- Successor: Eadsige
- Other post: Dean of Canterbury

Orders
- Consecration: 13 November 1020

Personal details
- Died: 28, 29, 30 October or 1 November 1038
- Buried: Canterbury Cathedral
- Parents: Æthelmær the Stout

Sainthood
- Feast day: 30 October
- Venerated in: Roman Catholic Church Eastern Orthodox Church
- Canonized: Pre-Congregation

Æthelnoth (Note: Also Ethelnoth, Ednoth, or Eadnodus) (died 1038) was the archbishop of Canterbury from 1020 until his death. Descended from an earlier English king, Æthelnoth became a monk prior to becoming archbishop. While archbishop, he travelled to Rome and brought back saints' relics. He consecrated a number of other bishops who came from outside his archdiocese, leading to some friction with other archbishops. Although he was regarded as a saint after his death, there is little evidence of his veneration or of a cult in Canterbury or elsewhere.

== Early life ==
Æthelnoth was a son of the Æthelmær the Stout and a grandson of Æthelweard the Historian, who was a great-great-grandson of King Æthelred of Wessex. In the view of the historian Frank Barlow, Æthelnoth was probably the uncle of Godwin of Wessex. He was baptised by Dunstan, and a story was told at Glastonbury Abbey that as the infant was baptised, his hand made a motion much like that an archbishop makes when blessing. From this motion, Dunstan is said to have prophesied that Æthelnoth would become an archbishop.

Æthelnoth became a monk at Glastonbury, then was made dean of the monastery of Christ Church Priory, at Canterbury, the cathedral chapter for the diocese of Canterbury. He was also a chaplain to King Cnut of England and Denmark as well as Dean of Canterbury when on 13 November 1020 Æthelnoth was consecrated as Archbishop of Canterbury. Æthelnoth's elevation probably was a gesture of appeasement, as Æthelnoth's brother Æthelweard had been executed in 1017 by Cnut, who also banished a brother-in-law named Æthelweard in 1020. A later story stated that Cnut favoured Æthelnoth because Æthelnoth had bestowed chrism on the king. This may be a garbled account of Æthelnoth's participation in Cnut's confirmation as a Christian in 1016 or his coronation in 1017. There are some indications that he was a student of Ælfric of Eynsham, the homilist.

== Archbishop of Canterbury ==
In 1022, Æthelnoth went to Rome to obtain the pallium, and was received by Pope Benedict VIII. On his return trip, he bought a relic of St Augustine of Hippo for 100 silver talents and one gold talent. He gave the relic to Coventry Abbey. He also presided over the translation of the relics of Ælfheah, his predecessor at Canterbury who was regarded as a martyr and saint. In 1022, Æthelnoth consecrated Gerbrand as bishop for the Diocese of Roskilde, which was in Scandinavia. The archbishop of Hamburg-Bremen was the metropolitan of Roskilde, and the fact that Gerbrand was consecrated by an English archbishop later caused friction between the bishop and his metropolitan. Cnut was forced to concede that in the future he would not appoint bishops in Bremen's archdiocese without the metropolitan's advice. A later tradition held that Æthelnoth consecrated two Welsh bishops, one at Llandaff and one at St. David's. He also consecrated Dúnán, the first bishop of Dublin, and other Scandinavian bishops.

The medieval chronicler William of Malmesbury praised Æthelnoth's wisdom. A story of doubtful authenticity tells how he refused to crown King Harold Harefoot, as he had promised Cnut to crown none but a son of the king by his wife, Emma. He was a leading figure in the third generation of the English Benedictine Reform.

== Death and legacy ==
Æthelnoth died in 1038, on either 28 October, 29 October, 30 October, or 1 November. Prior to his death, some of his episcopal functions were performed by a royal priest, Eadsige. He was buried in Canterbury Cathedral. He is considered a saint, with a feast day of 30 October. While he is listed in Jean Mabillon's Lives of the Benedictine Saints and in the Acta Sanctorum, there is no contemporary or later evidence of a cult being paid to him at Canterbury or elsewhere.

== Citations ==
Christian titles
Preceded by Lyfing	Archbishop of Canterbury; 1020–1038	Succeeded by Eadsige
