= Spearhafoc =

11th-century Bishop of London-elect and goldsmith

- Bishop of London-elect
- Appointed: 1051
- Term ended: 1052
- Predecessor: Robert of Jumièges
- Successor: William the Norman

Orders
- Consecration: never consecrated

Personal details
- Denomination: Christian

Spearhafoc was an eleventh-century Anglo-Saxon artist and Benedictine monk, whose artistic talent was apparently the cause of his rapid elevation to Abbot of Abingdon in 1047–48 and Bishop-Elect of London in 1051. After his consecration as bishop was thwarted, he vanished with the gold and jewels he had been given to make into a crown for King Edward the Confessor, and was never seen again. He was also famous for a miracle which impacted his career.

His name means "sparrowhawk" in Old English (Speraver in Latin).

== Clerical career ==
Spearhafoc was a monk at Bury St Edmunds Abbey, who according to several sources, including the Norman chronicler Goscelin, who knew him personally, "was outstanding in painting, gold-engraving and goldsmithery", the painting very likely mainly in illuminated manuscripts. It was probably his artistic work which brought into contact with the royal family and the Godwins. King Edward the Confessor imposed him as Abbot of Abingdon following the death of Æthelstan on 29 March of either 1047 or 1048. In 1051 Edward promoted him to Bishop of London, but upon the return of the previous Bishop of London, Robert of Jumièges, newly elevated to Archbishop of Canterbury, from his trip to Rome to receive his pallium, Robert refused to consecrate Spearhafoc, claiming that Pope Leo IX had forbidden it. After a stalemate "all that summer and autumn", with an unconsecrated Spearhafoc in possession of the see, the fall of Earl Godwin in September 1051, with whom Spearhafoc seems to have been allied, precipitated matters. Spearhafoc was expelled from London, and fled abroad, taking with him the gold and gems intended for King Edward's crown, as well as treasure from the London diocesan stores, stuffed into "very many bags":

... auri gemmarumque electarum pro corona imperiali cudenda, regis ejusdem assignatione receptam haberet copiam. Hinc et ex episcopii pecunia marsupiorum farsisset plurimum receptacula, clanculo Anglia secedens ultra non-apparuit.

The exact sequence and implied motivation of events differs between the sources, but even the history of his own monastery concluded "God's vengeance brought such ends for those by whose trickery the Church was diminished for their own profit". In the Anglo-Saxon Chronicle Spearhafoc's flight, placed in 1052, is related immediately after the description of Edward putting away his queen, which may imply a close relation between these events. A Norman kinsman of the king, Rodulf, had already replaced Spearhafoc in Abingdon, though he died in 1052.

Spearhafoc was replaced by William the Norman, and was the last Bishop of London of English ethnic origin for many years, probably until Roger Niger was appointed in 1228.

== Artistic work ==
Anglo-Saxon metalwork had a famous reputation as far afield as Italy, but hardly any pieces have survived the depredations of the Norman Conquest in 1066, and the English Reformation, as well as sales by their owners to buy land or for other purposes, of which a number by Spearhafoc's abbey of Abingdon are recorded after the Conquest. The references to three specific projects by Spearhafoc (the crown and the two sets of statues in Canterbury, described below), none of which have survived, are about works in precious metal, and he is one of a small number of metalwork artists from the period whose name we know and whose work is described in any way. Even the imprecise details given, mostly by Goscelin, are therefore valuable evidence of what Anglo-Saxon metalwork was like. Anglo-Saxon skill in gold-engraving, designs and figures engraved on gold objects, is mentioned by many foreign sources, and the few remaining engraved figures closely parallel the far more numerous pen-drawn figures in manuscripts, also an Anglo-Saxon speciality. Wall-paintings, which seem to have sometimes contained gold, were also apparently often made by manuscript illuminators, and Goscelin's description of his talents therefore suggests an artist skilled in all the main Anglo-Saxon media for figurative art – of which being a goldsmith was then regarded as the most prestigious branch.

Many monastic artists reached senior positions; Spearhafoc's career in metalwork was paralleled in less sensational fashion by his contemporary Mannig, Abbot of Evesham (Abbot 1044–58, d. 1066), and at the end of the previous century Saint Dunstan had been a very successful Archbishop of Canterbury. Spearhafoc's predecessor as Abbot of Abingdon, Saint Æthelwold of Winchester, had by this time acquired a reputation as a goldsmith, and was credited with the production of a range of metal objects at the abbey, including many figures and objects in precious metal, bells and even a pipe organ. However the lack of any reference to such skills in the contemporary biography by Wulfstan suggests this was a later elaboration, though one that shows the high status of goldsmithing at the time.

Like Spearhafoc, Mannig's biography, with some precise details, is given in the chronicle maintained by his abbey. His work also had a miracle associated with it – the lay goldsmith Godric stabbed his hand with an awl during the work on the large shrine at Evesham, which was miraculously healed overnight. Spearhafoc and Mannig are the "only two goldsmiths of whom we have extended accounts", and the additional information given about Godric, the leader of a team brought in by Mannig for the shrine, is also unique among the surviving evidence. Some twenty years after the miracle, Godric joined the Abbey of Evesham, presumably in retirement, and his son later became Prior there.

== Spearhafoc's miracle ==
According to Goscelin, while Spearhafoc was working on metal figures at St Augustine's Abbey in Canterbury, he lost a valuable ring given him by Edward's queen, and Godwin's daughter, Edith of Wessex, presumably as materials to use in his project. In his distress, he prayed to Saint Letard, buried in the church, after which the ring was found. In gratitude, he adorned Letard's tomb with "statues of enormous size and beauty" of the saint and of Queen Bertha of Kent, whose chaplain Letard had been. From other mentions it would seem such a description would mean the statues were at least approaching life-size. The miracle clearly added to his fame, and may have made him seem a more suitable candidate for elevation as bishop. For the art historian, it is one of a handful of references to large metal statues, other than on crucifixes, in Anglo-Saxon England, and the only one which associates them with a tomb or reliquary. One of the other mentions says that a different figure was made of thin gold and silver sheets supported by a wooden core, presumably in a similar fashion to the Golden Madonna of Essen, and some other Continental survivals.

No comparably early rood crosses with the side figures of Mary and John seem to survive, though we have large painted wooden crucifixes like the German Gero Cross of c. 980, and the Volto Santo of Lucca (renewed with a later figure), which is known to have inspired Leofstan, Abbot of Bury (d. 1065), to create a similar figure, perhaps covered in precious metal, on his return from a visit to Rome.

== Citations ==
Christian titles
Preceded by Robert of Jumièges	Bishop of London; 1051–1052	Succeeded by William the Norman
