= Eadberht (bishop of London) =

8th-century Bishop of London

- Bishop of London
- Appointed: between 772 and 782
- Term ended: between 787 and 789
- Predecessor: Wigheah
- Successor: Eadgar

Orders
- Consecration: between 772 and 782

Personal details
- Died: between 787 and 789
- Denomination: Christian

Eadberht (Note: Or Eadbert or Eadbeorht) (died between 787 and 789) was a medieval Bishop of London.

Eadberht was consecrated between 772 and 782. He died between 787 and 789.

== Citations ==
Christian titles
Preceded by Wigheah	Bishop of London c. 776–c. 788	Succeeded by Eadgar
