= Æthelnoth (bishop of London) =

9th-century Bishop of London

- Bishop of London
- Appointed: between 805 and 811
- Term ended: between 816 and 824
- Predecessor: Osmund
- Successor: Ceolberht

Orders
- Consecration: between 805 and 811

Personal details
- Died: between 816 and 824
- Denomination: Christian

Æthelnoth (or Æthilnoth; died between 816 and 824) was a medieval Bishop of London.

Æthelnoth was consecrated between 805 and 811. He died between 816 and 824.

== Citations ==
Christian titles
Preceded by Osmund	Bishop of London c. 808–c. 820	Succeeded by Ceolberht
