= Leofstan =

10th-century Bishop of London

- Bishop of London
- Appointed: between 909 and 926
- Term ended: between 909 and 926
- Predecessor: Æthelweard
- Successor: Theodred

Orders
- Consecration: between 909 and 926

Personal details
- Died: between 909 and 926
- Denomination: Christian

Leofstan (also Ealhstan or Elstanus; died between 909 and 926) was a medieval Bishop of London.

Leofstan was consecrated between 909 and 926. He died between 909 and 926.

== Citations ==
Christian titles
Preceded by Æthelweard	Bishop of London c. 915	Succeeded by Theodred
