= Philippe Labbe =

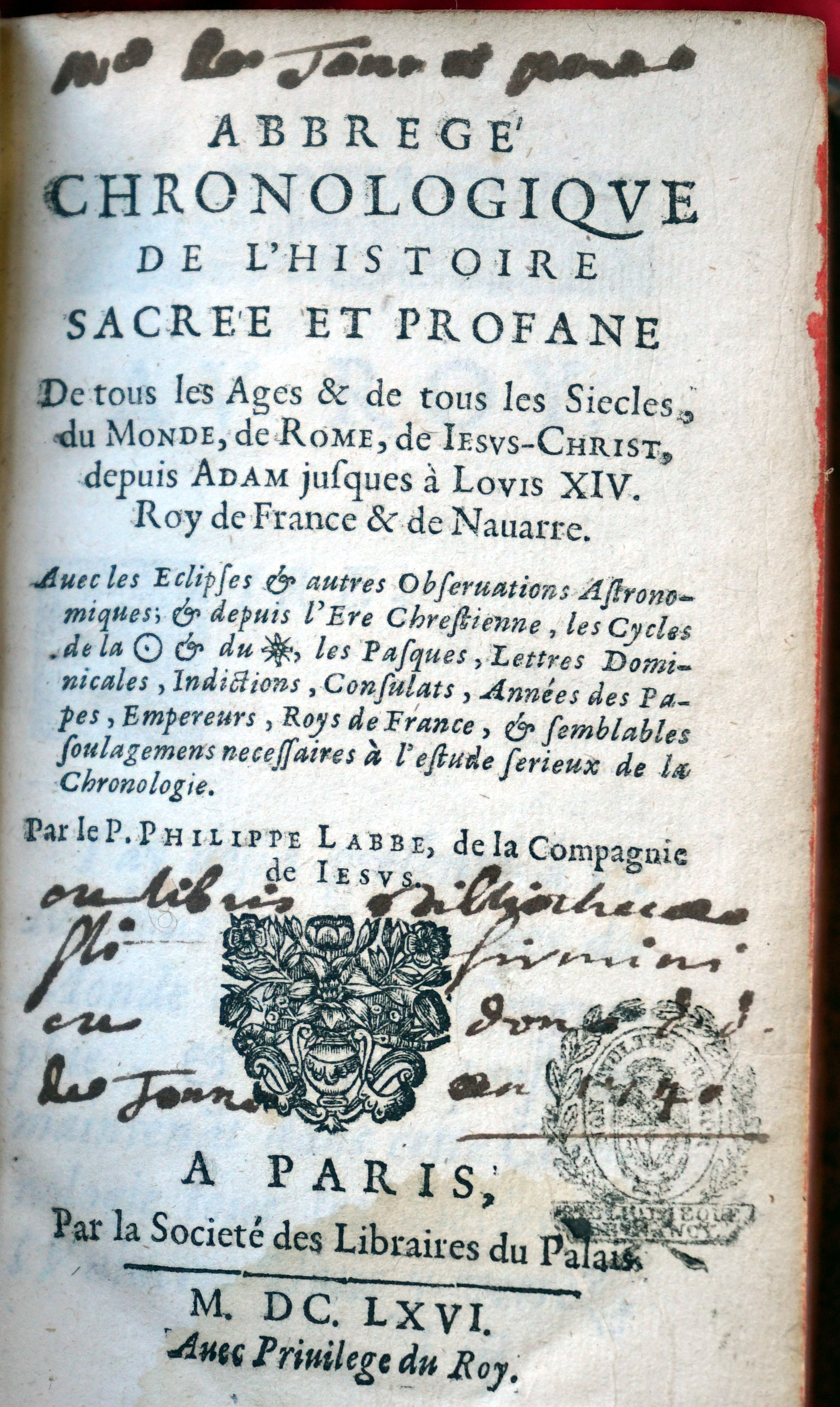

Philippe Labbe SJ (Latin: Philippus Labbeus; 10 July 1607 – 16 or 17 March 1667) was a French Jesuit writer on historical, geographical and philological questions.

Born in Bourges, he entered the Society of Jesus on 28 September 1623, at the age of 16. After literary, philosophical and theological studies, he successively taught classes of rhetoric and philosophy. He then held the chair of theology for five years. His memory was quick and retentive, his erudition extensive and accurate. He expressed his devotion to Christ and the Virgin Mary in elegant Latin verse. Labbe wrote more than 80 literary, philosophical and theological works. Every year witnessed the production of one or more of his works, in the field of history, Labbe and Denis Pétau have been considered the most remarkable of all French Jesuits.

In 1647 Nicolas Sanson accused the Jesuit Labbe of plagiarizing him in his Pharus Galliae Antiquae; his accusation was published in Sanson's In Pharum Galliae antiquae Philippi L'Abbe disquisitiones (1647–1648).

He died in Paris in 1667.

== Selected works ==
- Tirocinium Linguæ Græcæ etc. (1648)
- La Géographie royale (1646)
- De Byzantinæ historiæ scriptoribus, etc. (1648)
- Concordia sacræ et profanæ chronologiæ annorum 5691 ab orbe condito ad hunc Christi annum 1638 (1638)
- Bibliotheca antijanseniana (1654)
- Bibliotheca bibliothecarum (1664)
- Sancrosancti Oecumenici Tridentini Concilii . . . canones et decreta (1667)
- Sacrosancta concilia ad regiam editionem exacta (with Gabriel Cossart, 1671-72)

== See also ==
- Corpus Scriptorum Historiae Byzantinae
