= Gabriel Cossart =

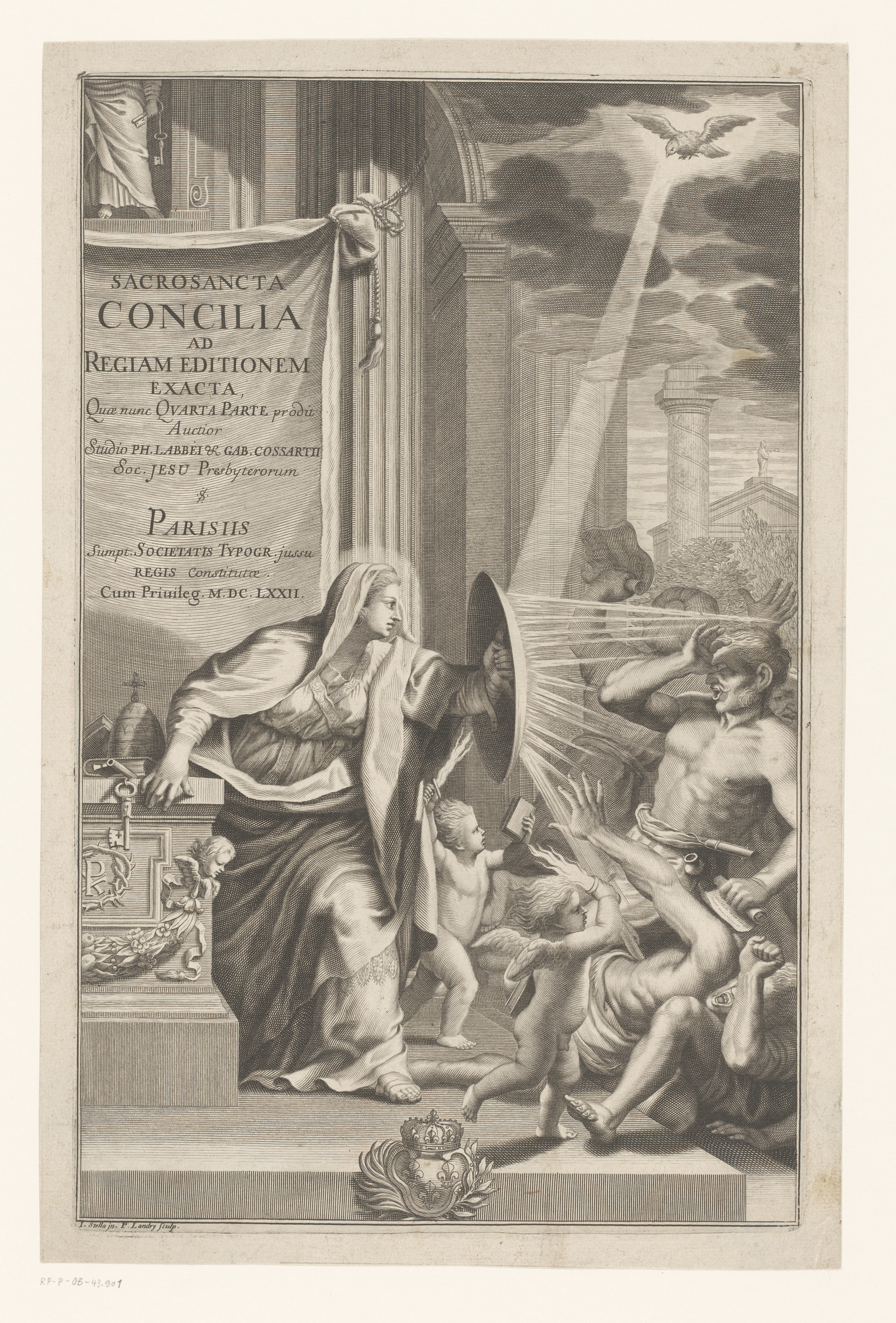
Philippe Labbé, Gabriel Cossart. Sacrosancta Concilia ad Regiam Editionem Exacta. Paris: s.n. 1642.

Gabriel Cossart SJ (22 November 1615 – 18 September 1674) was a French Jesuit, known as a historian. He taught rhetoric at the College de Clermont. He was a librarian there, described as “worldly-wise”, and a promoter of the careers of his students. As a scholar he collaborated with Philippe Labbe.

He engaged in controversy over Petrus Ramus with François du Monstier.

== Works ==
- Sacrosancta Concilia, with Philippe Labbe
- Orationes et Carmina
