= St Giles' Church, Mountnessing =

Church in Essex, England

Coordinates: 51°38′38″N 0°22′51″E

St Giles' Church
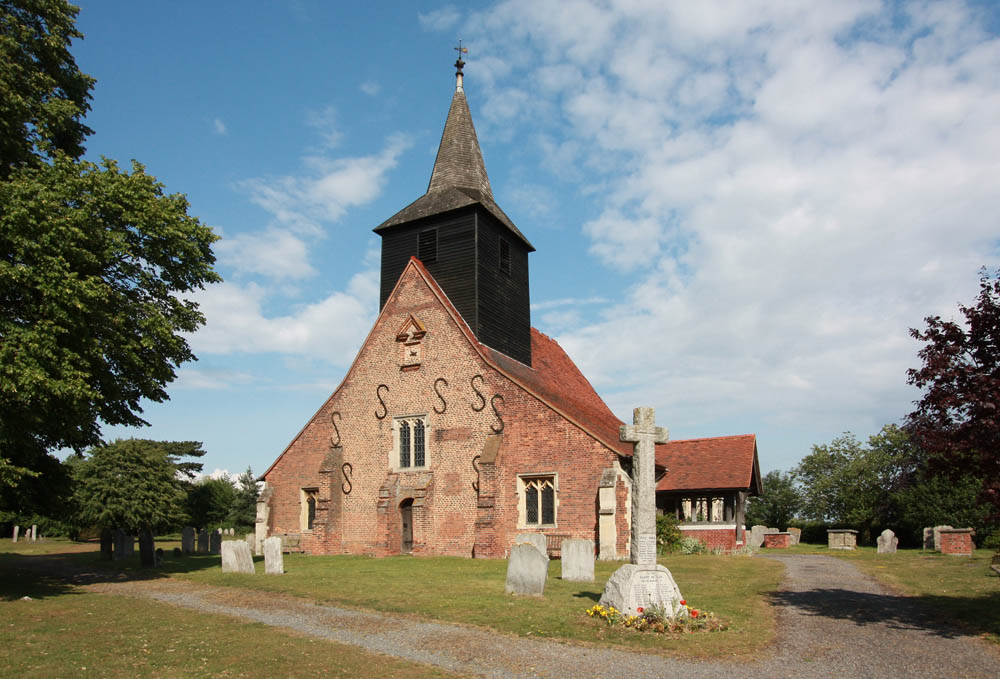
- The church in 2011
- St Giles' Church
- Location: Mountnessing, Essex
- Country: England

History
- Status: Parish church
- Dedication: St Giles

Architecture
- Functional status: Active
- Architect(s): George Frederick Bodley and Thomas Garner (1889 restoration)
- Architectural type: Church
- Style: Medieval; Victorian restoration

Administration
- Diocese: Chelmsford
- Parish: Mountnessing

St. Giles' Church is the parish church of Mountnessing, Essex, located about one and a half miles southeast of the village. It was first built in the 12th century, and appropriated to Thoby Priory. It was largely rebuilt in the late 19th century.

== History ==
The church originated in the late–11th century. In the mid–12th century the church was gifted to Thoby Priory by Michael Chèvre and confirmed by Richard, bishop of London 1152–1162.

The north and south aisles were built in the mid–13th century. The east wall of the north aisle incorporates re-used rubble from the former north wall of the nave, including indurated conglomerate, Roman bricks and tiles, and field stones. The north wall has been re-worked but re-uses similar rubble; it has a doorway and two windows with trefoiled heads, all 13th-century. The north arcade is also mid–13th century, the south slightly later; these are composed of two arches. The roof of the nave retains three 15th-century crown posts, but has since been rebuilt. The timber belfry in the west end of the nave was built in the 15th century.

The brick west front of the church has a 1653 date plate. The chancel was rebuilt in brick in the early 19th century; a brick in the east wall is inscribed "SB. 1818", probably the master builder and date of construction. The chancel arch may incorporate some 14th-century work.

Much of the church was rebuilt in 1889 by partners George Frederick Bodley and Thomas Garner. The south aisle was rebuilt and the north aisle re-faced. This is also when the south porch, organ chamber, vestry, pulpit and sounding board were added. The south porch was rebuilt 1912-13. A small north extension was built in 2002.

The stained glass window on the east wall of the chancel was designed by Henry Holiday and made by James Powell & Sons in 1869; the one on the east wall of the north aisle was made in 1891, by Charles Eamer Kempe. In the church there is a long chest probably from the 13th century, and a 15th-century font from All Saints Church in Hutton. The communion rail is early 18th century. On the east wall there are paintings of Moses and Aaron. These were formerly part of a 1726 reredos in St Martin, Little Waltham, and were installed here in 1888.

The church was Grade I listed by Historic England in 1967 because of the "outstanding quality" of the timber belfry.
