= Richard de Beaumis =

Richard de Beaumis may refer to:

- Richard de Beaumis (died 1127), medieval Bishop of London
- Richard de Beaumis (died 1162), medieval Bishop of London
