= Thoby Priory =

Monastery in Mountnessing, Essex, England

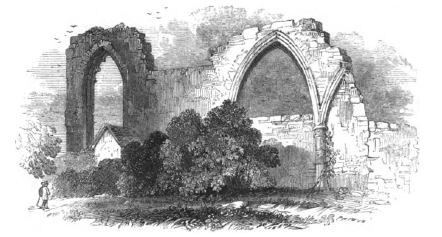
- 1845 engraving of Thoby Priory by Alfred Inigo Suckling
- Interactive map of Thoby Priory

Monastery information
- Order: Augustinian canons
- Established: c. 1141
- Disestablished: 1525
- Dedication: Saint Mary and Saint Leonard

People
- Founders: Michael Chèvre and his wife and son

Architecture
- Status: Ruins
- Heritage designation: Scheduled monument; Grade II listed ruins

Site
- Location: Mountnessing, Essex
- Country: England
- Coordinates: 51.663381°N 0.3506°E
- Public access: No public access

Thoby Priory was an Augustinian priory in Mountnessing, Essex. It was founded around 1141 and dissolved on 15 February 1525 by Cardinal Wolsey in order to fund his Cardinal College, Oxford. After dissolution, its lands and buildings passed through several owners including William Petre, and a mansion was built on the site. Today only a fragment of the priory church survives.

== History ==
=== Foundation ===
Around 1141 Michael Chèvre, who held the manor of Chevers in nearby Doddinghurst, addressed a charter to Robert, bishop of London 1141–1150, granting to Tobias, the prior, and the canons a hide of land, pannage for 40 pigs, and tithes of hay and mill. It is possible that this was in fact the foundation charter of the priory. His gifts of the Greate Woode of Thoby and the Church of St. Giles to the priory were confirmed by Richard, bishop of London 1152–1162. The priory was bounded by the river Wid to the east and north. Its name was changed over time from Ginges to Gingetobye and then to Thoby, seemingly after the name of the prior. The advowson of the priory was later held by the Mounteney family.

=== Dissolution ===
In September 1524 a papal bull from Clement VII authorized the suppression of 22 religious houses in England to provide funds for Cardinal Wolsey's educational foundations. The priory was dissolved on 15 February, 1525 by Wolsey's agent John Alen, and the following year Wolsey granted the priory to Cardinal College, Oxford. At the time of its dissolution there was a prior and two canons at the priory. Its spiritualities were valued at £18 13s. 4d. and its temporalities at £56 13s. 6½d, yearly, and among its possessions were the manors of Thoby, Mountnessing, Bluntswalles (in Great Burstead) and Cubfold, and St. Giles' Church. By August 1525, the prior had died and the two canons had been transferred elsewhere. In October 1527 a payment of 13s 4d was made for taking down the priory bells and transporting them to London.

The transference of ownership was delayed in part by Clement VII's authorization in 1529 to transfer part of the Oxford endowments (including land from Thoby) to the Ipswich School, which was by then in serious financial difficulties. Then in October 1529 Wolsey was indicted for praemunire, and his college and school endowments were forfeit to the crown. The priory was granted for life to Richard Page in December 1530, with the permanent ownership of the estate (the reversion on Page's death) being granted in 1539 to William Berners, an auditor of the Court of Augmentations, and his wife Dorothy. Most of the priory's properties passed into different ownership after the dissolution, but the majority of the demesne lands remained in the hands of the Berners family and their successors by marriage or inheritance into the twentieth century. William Petre acquired a number of the priory's landholdings, including the advowson and rectory of Mountnessing. He also purchased the wardship of William Berner's son (also named William), thus gaining control of the estate until William junior's majority.

=== Later history ===
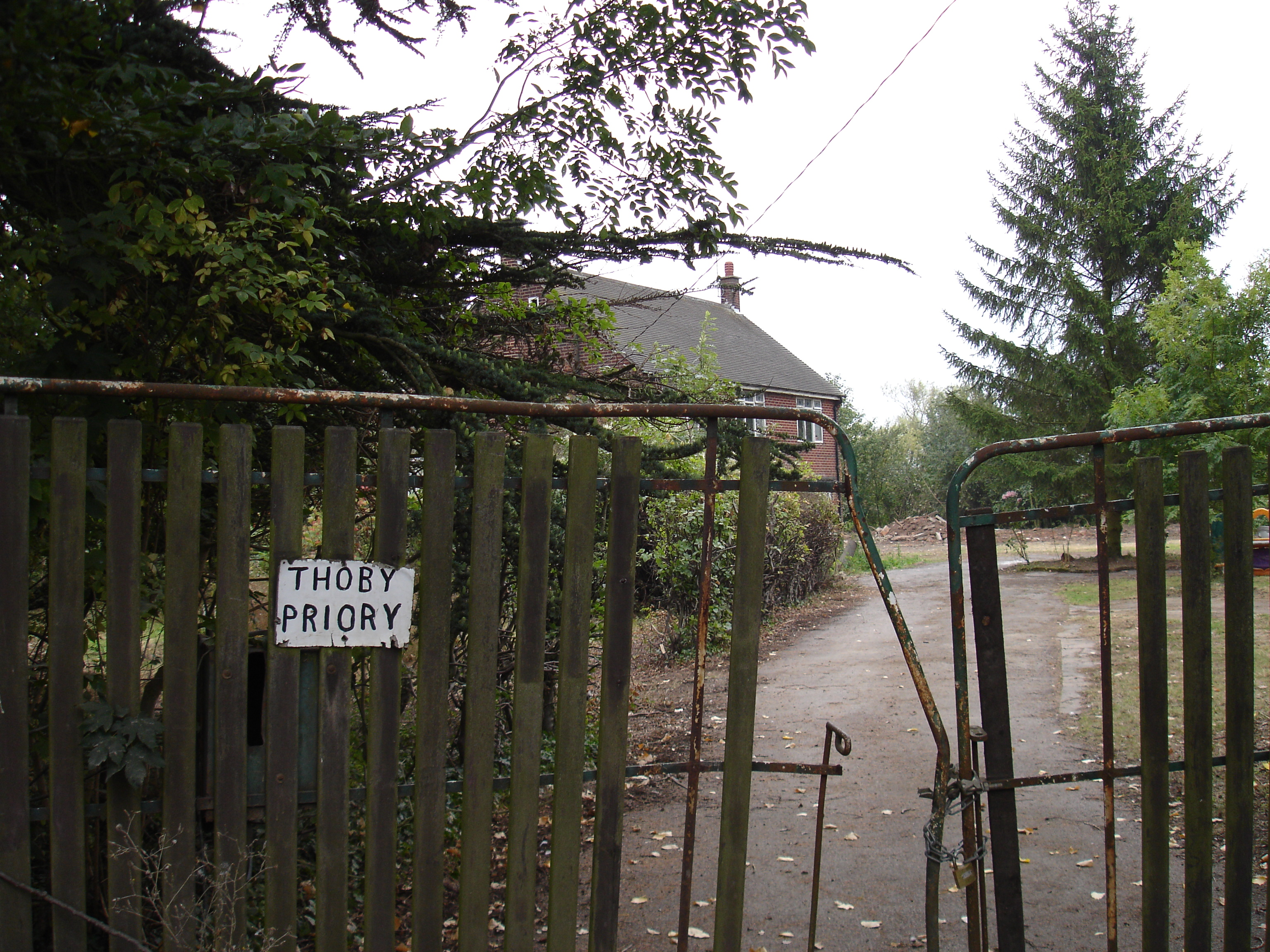
Gateway to site of Thoby Priory, 2007

At some point before 1556 the west range of the priory buildings had been adapted for secular use; an inventory in this year reveals a large house with a hall, buttery, parlour, pantry, kitchen, cellar, 14 chambers, and various offices. The area immediately surrounding the medieval priory remained as gardens and a small park for the mansion. The house was enlarged in the nineteenth century before being severely damaged by a fire in 1893, in which most or all of the medieval woodwork was lost. Though subsequently repaired, the house suffered from gradual decline in the twentieth century.

During World War 2 everything in the house was sold at auction, the army took over the house and a prisoner of war camp was set up. A searchlight and anti-aircraft gun were installed in a nearby field. Later in the war the location was used as a training centre for the land army, until 1948. The mansion was finally demolished in 1953.

The site has since been used for workshops, industrial storage, and as a car scrap yard. Of the priory buildings, only one wall of the priory church survives, in poor condition. This consists of about 15m of the south wall of the presbytery and nave arch, dating to the 14th and 15th centuries. One of the surviving arches had collapsed by 1999.

== Archaeology ==
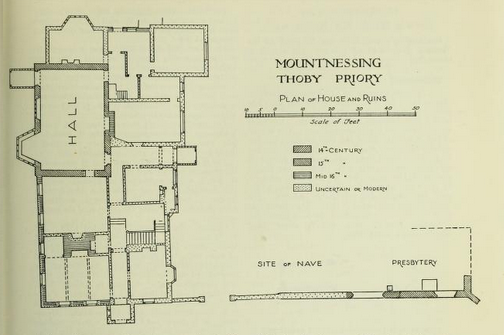
1923 diagram of the priory showing the house and the remains of the church (RCHME)

In his 1845 survey of the site, Suckling noted the discovery of 6 oak coffins, slip-decordated floor tiles in the chancel area of the priory church, and the lower portion of a damaged stone figure of a Knight Templar. A Royal Commission on the Historical Monuments of England survey, published 1923, concluded that the fabric of the hall in the house was from the 15th century, with an extension to the south dating from the mid-16th century. A stone coffin containing a skeleton was found by workmen in 1934.

In 2002, after a planning permission application to develop the site for housing, Essex County Council Field Archaeology Unit dug evaluation trenches to the south west of the site of the church, revealing 29 graves assumed to be contemporary with the priory. The remains of the mansion and the medieval foundations of the church were also located.

In 2014, in support of a design of another planning application, an archaeological evaluation was conducted by Archaeology South-East, commissioned by CgMs Consulting, "to discover whether any remains of the medieval priory, including the cloister, survive to the north of the known site of the priory church". Aside from a medieval hearth and worked stone used at a later date, no remains of the priory were discovered. The brief states that the priory buildings were likely pulled down and the building material reused. An earlier suggestion that the mansion was built over the priory refectory was investigated, but the bricks of the refectory wall suggested a post-suppression date. The brief also envisaged that for development of the site to take place, an area of the site would be subject to "preservation in situ". This would incorporate the "Scheduled Ancient Monument and the known extent of the priory foundations and cemetery".
