= Mountnessing =

Village and civil parish in Essex, England

Coordinates: 51°39′17″N 0°21′23″E

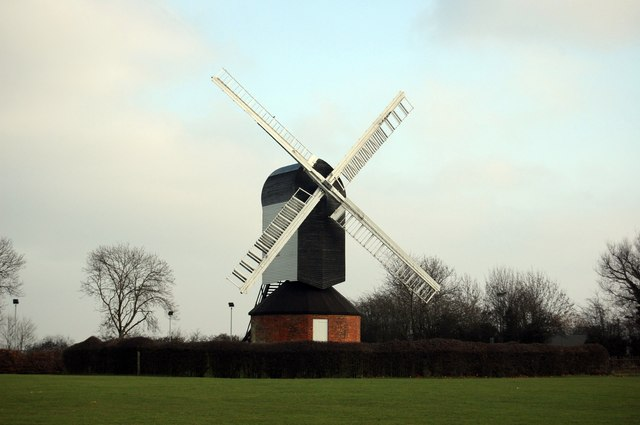
- Mountnessing Windmill

- Location within Essex
- Population: 1,437 (Parish, 2021)
- OS grid reference: TQ624971
- Civil parish: Mountnessing
- District: Brentwood
- Shire county: Essex
- Region: East
- Country: England
- Sovereign state: United Kingdom
- Post town: BRENTWOOD
- Postcode district: CM13, CM15
- Dialling code: 01277
- Police: Essex
- Fire: Essex
- Ambulance: East of England
- UK Parliament: Brentwood and Ongar

Mountnessing is a village and civil parish in the Borough of Brentwood in Essex, England. It is situated to the north-east of Brentwood and south-west of Ingatestone. The main part of the village lies along the Roman Road between Brentwood and Ingatestone, which was formerly the A12 until the village was bypassed in the 1970s. The village is approximately equidistant between the two closest railway stations at Shenfield and Ingatestone. Its main attraction is Mountnessing Windmill. At the 2021 census the parish had a population of 1,437.

== History ==
Mountnessing is one of a number of villages on or near the river Wid to contain an old name, Ing. It is thought that this was the name of a large district that encompassed these places, found in the Domesday Book as Ginga or Inga, part of the Chelmsford Hundred. Its etymology is uncertain, but Eilert Ekwall has proposed the reconstructed Old English name *Gigingas or similar as the original name of the district. He connects this with OE gē (equivalent of Gothic gawi), meaning "district". Gawi is posited as the base of Gauingen in Germany, and is found in several personal names. Ekwall suggests *Gēga or *Giga as possible Essex-dialect personal names (derived from gē) from which *Gigingas (possibly "the people of Giga") may derive.

In 1086, the two Ginga settlements in the Domesday Book that correspond to Mountnessing were held by tenant-in-chief Ranulf brother of Ilger, who was also lord of the more valuable of the two. In total there were 11 hides and 48 households, consisting of 16 villagers (villeins), 1 freeman, 23 smallholders (bordars), and 8 slaves (serfs), as well as 60 sheep, 7 cattle, and woodland to support 760 pigs. The land passed to the Mounteney family (named after a place called Montenay or Montigny in Normandy) and its name evolved to Gynge[s] Munteny by the 13th century, then Mounteneysynge ("Mounteney's Ing") in the 15th century.

=== Medieval manors ===
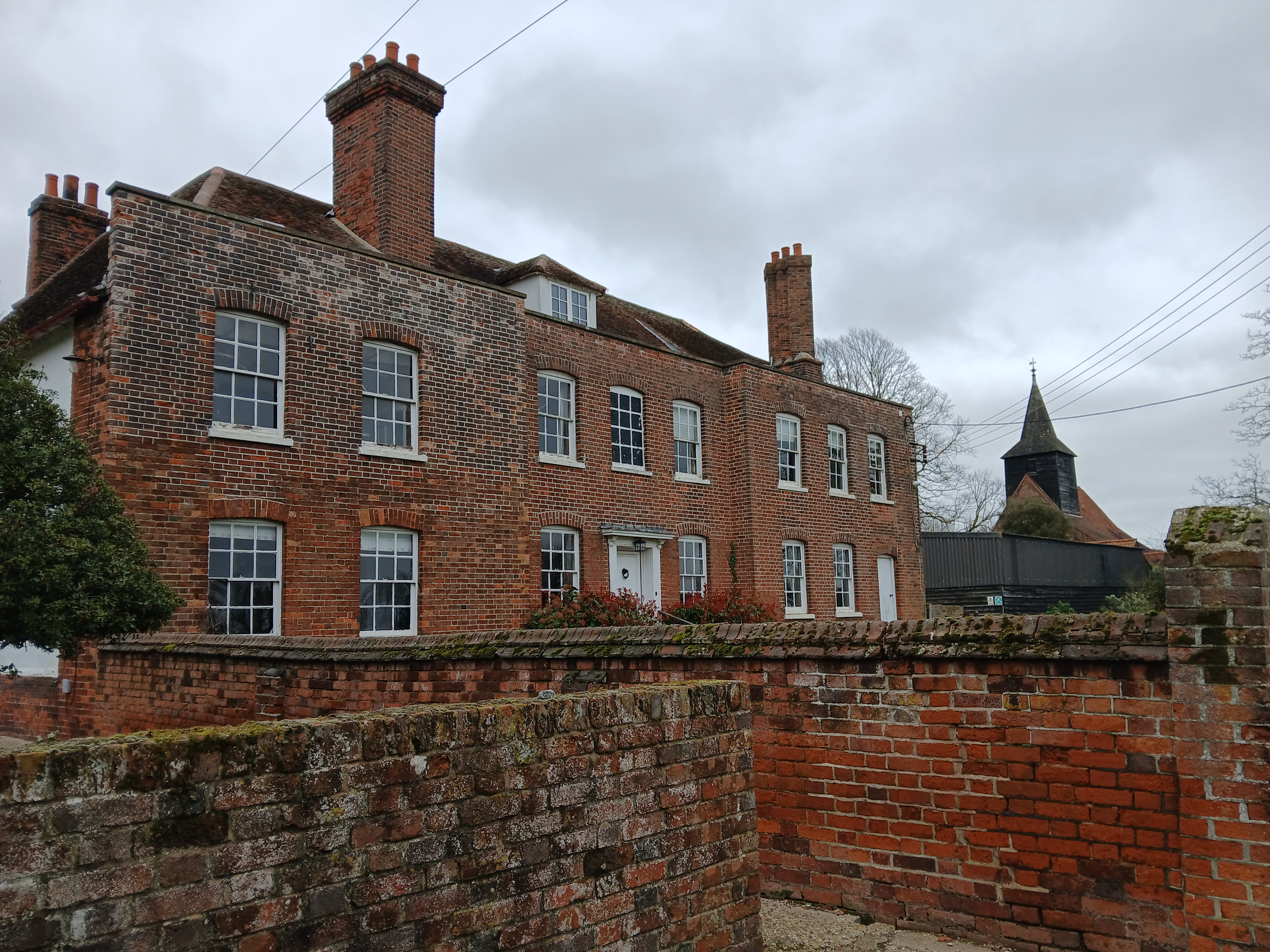
Mountnessing Hall

In medieval times Mountnessing encompassed five manors: (the manor of) Mountnessing, Bacons, Arnolds, Cowbridge, and Chevers. Mountnessing belonged to the Mountney family originally, though the house has since been rebuilt; Mountnessing Hall was built in the late 16th century and extended and altered in the late 18th and early 19th centuries. It was purchased by William Petre in the 16th century, and still belongs to the Petre family.

Cowbridge is a manor given in the Domesday Book, at which time its lord was William (of Bosc) and its tenant-in chief Ranulf brother of Ilger. It came into the possession of the Abbey of Stratford Langthorn, and after the dissolution of the monasteries in 1538 it was next owned by Richard Rich, who alienated it to William Petre in 1545. The manor house is no longer visible, having been replaced by a Georgian building. Cowbridge is no longer in the parish of Mountnessing due to boundary changes.

Arnolds may have been named after Sir Arnulph Mountney, and from the late 16th century it was in the Pert family, who held it of William Petre. It stayed in that family for 200 years. Bacons was held by the Bacon family in socage from the Mountney family, and in 1306 it was held by John de Gings as part of a knight's fee. It too was purchased by Petre in the 16th century. Chevers was named after a family surnamed Chevre. Nothing of the house remains.

=== Windmill ===
Quarter sessions records from October 1580 mention the "Mountnessing Mill", which stood on roughly the same spot as the present windmill. The present mill is thought to have been built circa 1807, the date painted on the crown tree, and it was in regular use until 1924, when the miller began to use an oil engine to grind corn. The mill was then acquired by the parish council in 1937 and later by the county council. It was restored in the late 20th century.

Mountnessing had a water mill on the river Wid, and there is evidence that this lay to the south of St Giles Church.

=== Churches ===
An Augustinian monastery called Thoby Priory was founded in the parish, possibly around 1141 when a charter is addressed by Michael Chevre (of the manor of Chevers) to Robert, bishop of London. It lay on a site to the north-west of the modern village. The priory was suppressed in 1525. Some ruins of the priory buildings remain.

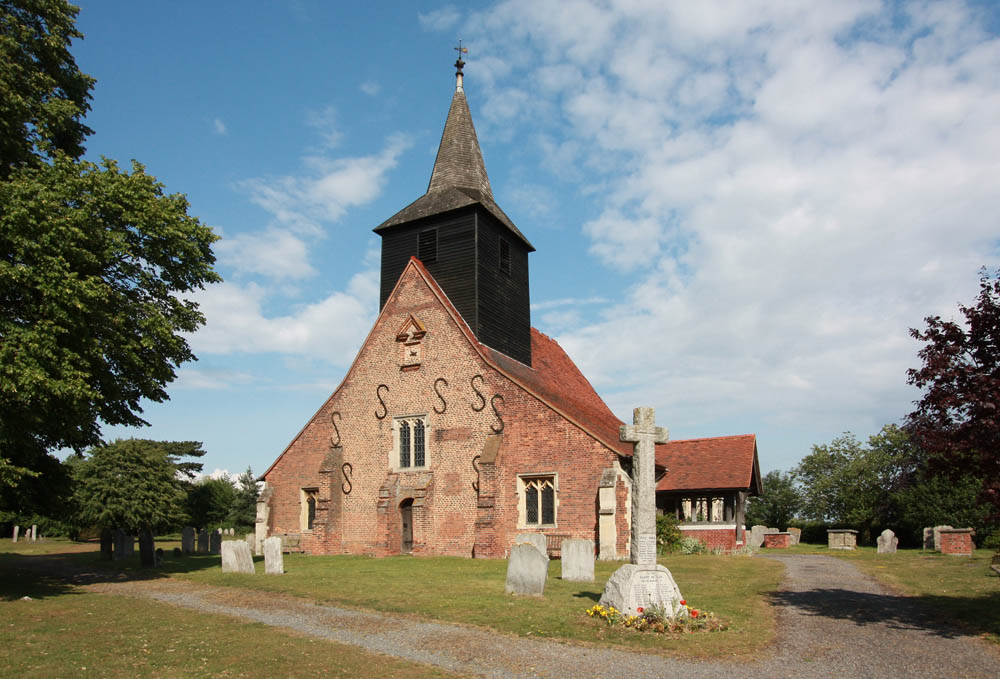
St Giles' Church

It is not known when exactly Mountnessing became a parish, but the earliest surviving mention of a vicar is a man known only as William who witnessed Chevre's charter of Thoby Priory. Mountnessing's parish church is dedicated to St Giles and the oldest parts date back to the late 11th century.

In May 1873 a new "Iron Church", now known as St. John's Hall, was opened in Mountnessing by the bishop of Rochester, with seating for 250 people. This was because St. Giles was thought to be too far away for the elderly (and everyone else, in bad weather). R.Y. MacNamara, vicar at the time, negotiated a site with trustees of the Thoby Priory estate, owned by the Blencowe family. It was funded by a £110 donation from Mrs. Bannantyne, Mr. Blencowe's aunt. In 1895 an organ from Bevington and Sons was purchased to replace the harmonium; this was later sold to Christ Church, Billericay. In the late 20th century the church was converted into a multi-purpose building.

=== Settlement ===
The parish historically comprised numerous scattered hamlets within the rural area rather than having a dominant central village. The church and the 16th century manor house of Mountntessing Hall stand alongside each other, but with few other houses nearby. A village gradually grew up along the Roman road which later became the A12, some 1.3 miles (2.1 km) north-west of the parish church.

The A12 now bypasses the village to the south-east. The village is now classed as part of the built up area of Ingatestone by the Office for National Statistics.

== Amenities ==
An annual village fete is held in July. In the Windmill field, there is a village hall, cricket pitch, football pitches and tennis courts.

The village has three pubs (The George and Dragon, The Plough and the Prince of Wales), a butcher's and a hairdressers.

There is a primary school, Mountnessing C of E, on Roman Road.

== Governance ==
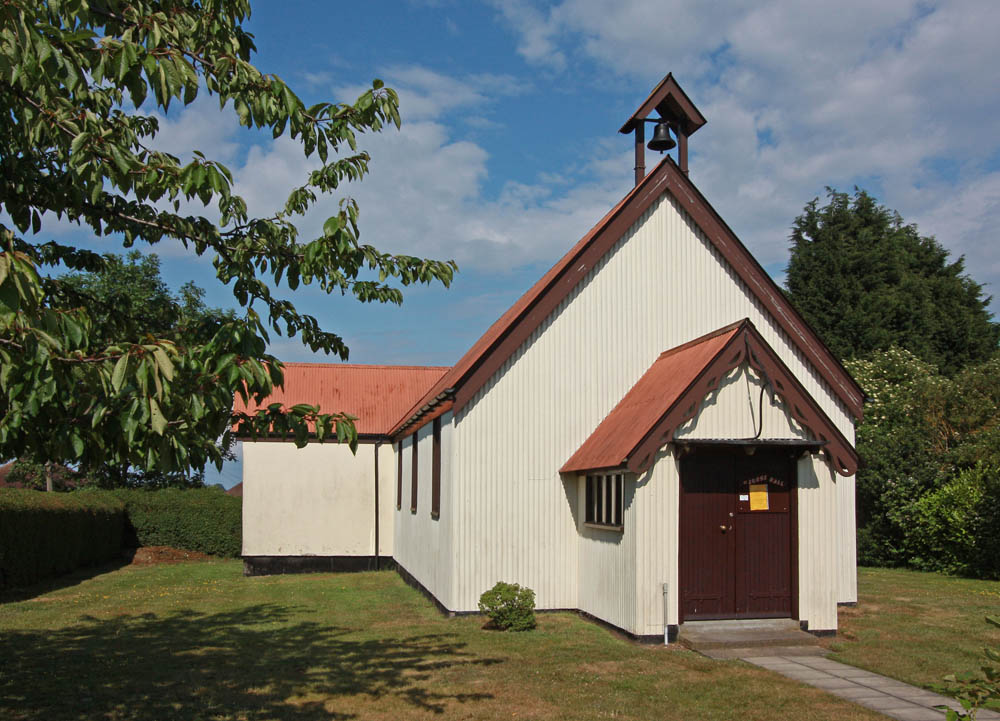
St John's Hall

There are three tiers of local government covering Mountnessing, at parish (village), district, and county level: Mountnessing Village Council, Brentwood Borough Council, and Essex County Council. The parish council generally meets at St John's Hall on Church Close and has an office at the Village Hall on Roman Road.

Mountnessing was an ancient parish in the Chelmsford Hundred of Essex. When elected parish and district councils were established in 1894, the parish was included in the Billericay Rural District (which included most of Brentwood). However, upon the abolition of that rural district in 1934, Mountnessing was not, unlike some other villages in the area, included in the new Brentwood Urban District. Rather, the area of the parish covering the village itself was transferred to the Chelmsford Rural District, with only the areas in the parish contiguous with Billericay and Brentwood going to their respective urban districts. Further reforms in 1974 saw the parish become re-associated with Brentwood, becoming part of its new non-metropolitan district.

== Sport ==
The village is home to Mountnessing Cricket Club.

A short-lived greyhound racing track was opened during 1931, at Chain Bridge on the main London Road. The racing was independent (not affiliated to the sports governing body the National Greyhound Racing Club) and known as a flapping track, which was the nickname given to independent tracks. Racing took place every Saturday at 3pm, but did not continue beyond 1932.
