= Mountnessing Windmill =

Windmill in Essex, England

Mountnessing Mill
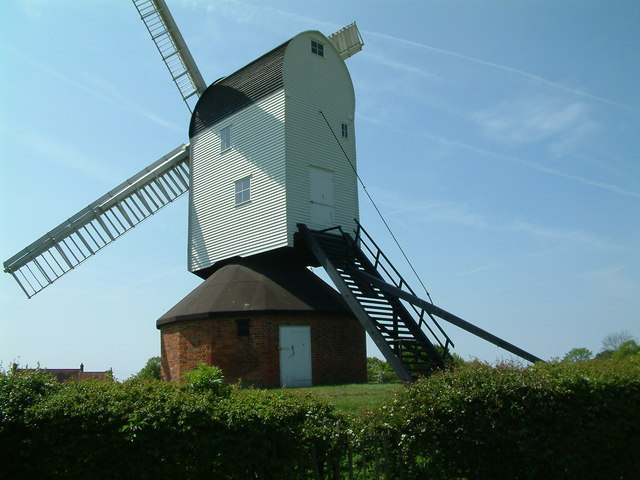
- The restored mill, April 2007

Origin
- Mill name: Mountnessing Mill
- Mill location: TQ 631 979
- Coordinates: 51°39′22″N 0°21′29″E
- Operator(s): Essex County Council
- Year built: 1807

Information
- Purpose: Corn mill
- Type: Post mill
- Roundhouse storeys: Single storey roundhouse
- No. of sails: Four sails
- Type of sails: Spring sails
- Windshaft: Cast iron
- Winding: Tailpole
- Auxiliary power: Portable steam engine
- No. of pairs of millstones: Two pairs

Mountnessing Windmill is a grade II* listed post mill at Mountnessing, Essex, England. Built in 1807, it was most recently restored to working order in 1983.

== History ==
Mountnessing Windmill was built in 1807, replacing an earlier mill. There are records of a windmill here since 1477. The mill was working until 1924, and it worked again in 1932–33.

In 1937, ownership of the mill passed from the Blencowe Estates to Mountnessing Parish Council. It was repaired as a memorial to King George VI, whose coronation was in that year.

== Restoration ==
The mill was restored to working order between 1979 and 1983. A complete new roof was fitted, and the tail of the mill rebuilt. New sails were fitted, and the mill officially opened by Hervey Benham on 13 November 1983. The internal machinery has been rebuilt by Peter Stenning and Richard Seago, and the mill is in full working order.

== Description ==
Mountnessing Windmill is a post mill with a single-storey sixteen-sided roundhouse. The mill is winded by a tailpole. It has four spring sails. There are two pairs of millstones in the breast.

=== Trestle and roundhouse ===
The trestle is of oak, with the main post of elm. The crosstrees are 22 feet (6.71 m) long, 13 inches (330 mm) by 10 inches (254 mm) in section. The underside of the lower crosstree is 5 feet 6 inches (1.68 m) above ground level. The main post is nearly 19 feet (5.79 m) in length, 29 inches (737 mm) square at its base. The quarterbars are 13 inches (330 mm) by 10 inches (254 mm) in section. The mill was originally built as an open trestle mill, with a roundhouse added at a later date. Three of the crosstree/quarterbar joints have been strengthened with bolted splints. The sixteen-sided roundhouse is of brick, with a boarded roof covered in tarred felt. It had a thatched roof until 1909, when it was replaced as it was infested with rats.

=== Body ===
The body of the mill measures just under 18 feet (5.49 m) by 11 feet (3.35 m) in plan. The crowntree is 22 inches (559 mm) square in section. It receives a 10 inches (254 mm) diameter pintle projecting from the top of the main post. The side girts are 9 inches (229 mm) by 20 inches (508 mm) in section at the ends, thickening to 22 inches (560 mm) at the crosstree.

=== Sails and windshaft ===
As originally built, the mill would have had a wooden windshaft and four common sails. The sails are spring sails. The windshaft is of cast iron, replacing the former wooden one. It was probably second-hand when fitted to the mill. It has a mounting for a tail wheel, which would have been forward-facing when fitted; this and other evidence shows that the mill was originally built with a head and tail layout.

=== Machinery ===
The wooden brake wheel is of clasp arm construction. It has 77 cogs of 4 inches (102 mm) pitch, driving a wooden wallower with 21 cogs. The cast-iron spur wheel is 3 feet 6 inches (1.07 m) diameter with 66 cogs. It drives the two pairs of millstones underdrift via two 22 inches (559 mm) diameter stone nuts with 32 cogs each. The mill was assisted in its later years by a portable steam engine, which had been built by Wedlake & Dendy Ltd., Engineers of Hornchurch and carried their works number 74.

== Millers ==
- Robert Agnis 1807 - 1826
- Joseph Agnis 1826 -
- Alfred Agnis 1863
- Joseph Agnis - 1906
- Robert Agnis 1908 - 1924
- Emily Agnis 1932 - 1933

References for above:-

== Public access ==
The mill is open to the public on the third Sunday of each month between May and October.
