= Richard de Belmeis II =

12th-century Bishop of London

Richard de Beaumis
- Bishop of London
- Elected: 1152
- Term ended: 4 May 1162
- Predecessor: Robert de Sigello
- Successor: Gilbert Foliot
- Other post: Archdeacon of Middlesex

Orders
- Ordination: 20 September 1152
- Consecration: 28 September 1152

Personal details
- Died: 4 May 1162
- Denomination: Catholic

Richard de Belmeis (died 1162) was a medieval cleric, administrator and politician. His career culminated in election as Bishop of London in 1152. He was one of the founders of Lilleshall Abbey in Shropshire.

== Origins ==
Richard de Belmeis belonged to an ecclesiastical and secular land-owning dynasty associated with his uncle, Richard de Belmeis I, Bishop of London from 1108 to 1127, He is generally regarded as the brother of Richard Ruffus, who was an archdeacon of Essex, and their father is given as Robert de Belmeis throughout Diana Greenway's edition of Fasti Ecclesiae Anglicanae. However, Eyton, the Shropshire antiquarian and historian, gave the name of Richard's father as Walter in his study of the origins of Lilleshall Abbey, and repeated this in his further work on the Belmeis family and their holdings, including a family tree. This has been accepted by successive editions of the Dictionary of National Biography.

The Belmeis family is thought to have originated in Beaumais-sur-Dive, east of Falaise, in the Calvados region of Normandy, although this is not certain. Beginning as a minor Shropshire landholder and steward of Roger Montgomery, 1st Earl of Shrewsbury, the elder Richard de Belmeis skilfully avoided involvement in rebellion to become Henry I's viceroy in Shropshire and later Bishop of London. His success enable not only the younger Richard, but a considerable number of family members, to pursue lucrative ecclesiastical careers, while Philip de Belmeis, emerged as his main temporal heir.

=== Family tree ===
The Belmeis family

Based on genealogy given by Eyton, supplemented by reference to Fasti Ecclesiae Anglicanae.

Unknown de Belmeis
Unknown de Langford	Unknown de Belmeis	Unknown de Mareni	Avelina de Belmeis	Richard de Belmeis I, Bishop of London 1108-1127	Robert or Walter de Belmeis	Unknown
Ralph de Langford, Dean of St Paul's, died 1150s	William de Mareni, Dean of St Paul's, died 1138	William de Belmeis I, Archdeacon of London.	Walter de Belmeis, Canon of St Paul's, Prebendary of Newington	Robert de Belmeis	RICHARD DE BELMEIS II, Archdeacon of Middlesex, Dean of St Alkmund's, Bishop of London 1152-62	Philip de Belmeis, Lord of Tong, Shropshire died c.1154	Matilda	Richard Ruffus I, Archdeacon of Essex, died 1167
William de Belmeis II, Canon of St Paul's, Prebendary of St Pancras, died c.1185	Philip de Belmeis II, died c.1159 sine prole	Ranulf de Belmeis, died c.1167 sine prole	Adelicia de Belmeis	Alan de la Zouche	Richard Ruffus II, Canon of St Paul's, died c.1201	Richard Junior, Canon of St Paul's, died 1214
Belmeis family, Shropshire landowners	Zouche family and Barons Zouche, major landowners in the Midlands

== Career ==
=== Archdeacon of Middlesex ===
Richard Belmeis II seems initially to have held Caddington Major, an important prebend of St Paul's Cathedral. The parish of Caddington lay across the border of Hertfordshire and Bedfordshire, but the prebendal estates of Great and Little Caddington were at that time on the Hertfordshire side. They were of great importance to the chapter of St Paul's: it had very full rights of jurisdiction there and was to hold the manors until it was abolished at the end of the English Civil War in 1649.

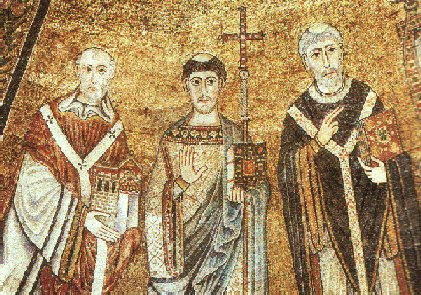
Innocent II depicted, left, in a mosaic in the church Santa Maria in Trastevere, Rome.

Well before the death of his uncle in 1127, Richard was named Archdeacon of Middlesex. Installed while still a minor, his nomination was the work of his uncle. His archdeaconry was placed under the custody of one Hugh - thought to be the Master Hugh who was magister scholarum until 1127 and sometime Prebendary of Hoxton. At some point in the episcopacy of Gilbert Universalis (1128–34), Richard sought the return of his archdeaconry, but the bishop allowed Hugh to retain it. Though the details are little known, Richard's rivalry with Hugh prior to the final installation of Richard in 1138 was possibly the origin of the notorious English drinking song "Oh Lord Belmeis."

However, Gilbert's death was followed by a bitter struggle over the succession, which gave Richard an opportunity to seek resolution to his own dispute. The bishop-elect, Anselm of St Saba, was opposed by a faction within the chapter of St Paul's Cathedral, centred on the dean. This continued even after he was enthroned in 1137. In 1138 Richard de Belmeis was sent to Rome as a representative of the dean's faction in an attempt to induce Pope Innocent II to reverse Anselm's appointment. At this point the dean was probably William de Mareni, although he died during 1138 and was replaced by William de Langford: both were cousins of Richard de Belmeis. Innocent upheld the appeal and Richard then pressed the question of his archdeaconry. The Pope remitted the issue to the arbitration of Alexander, Bishop of Lincoln and Robert de Bethune, Bishop of Hereford, who found in Richard's favour. Probably as a consequence of this victory, in December Alberic of Ostia, the Papal legate, who was in England to oversee a fresh election for the see of London, ordered that he be ordained a deacon. This was done by Henry of Blois, the Bishop of Winchester and brother of King Stephen.

=== Founding of Lilleshall Abbey ===
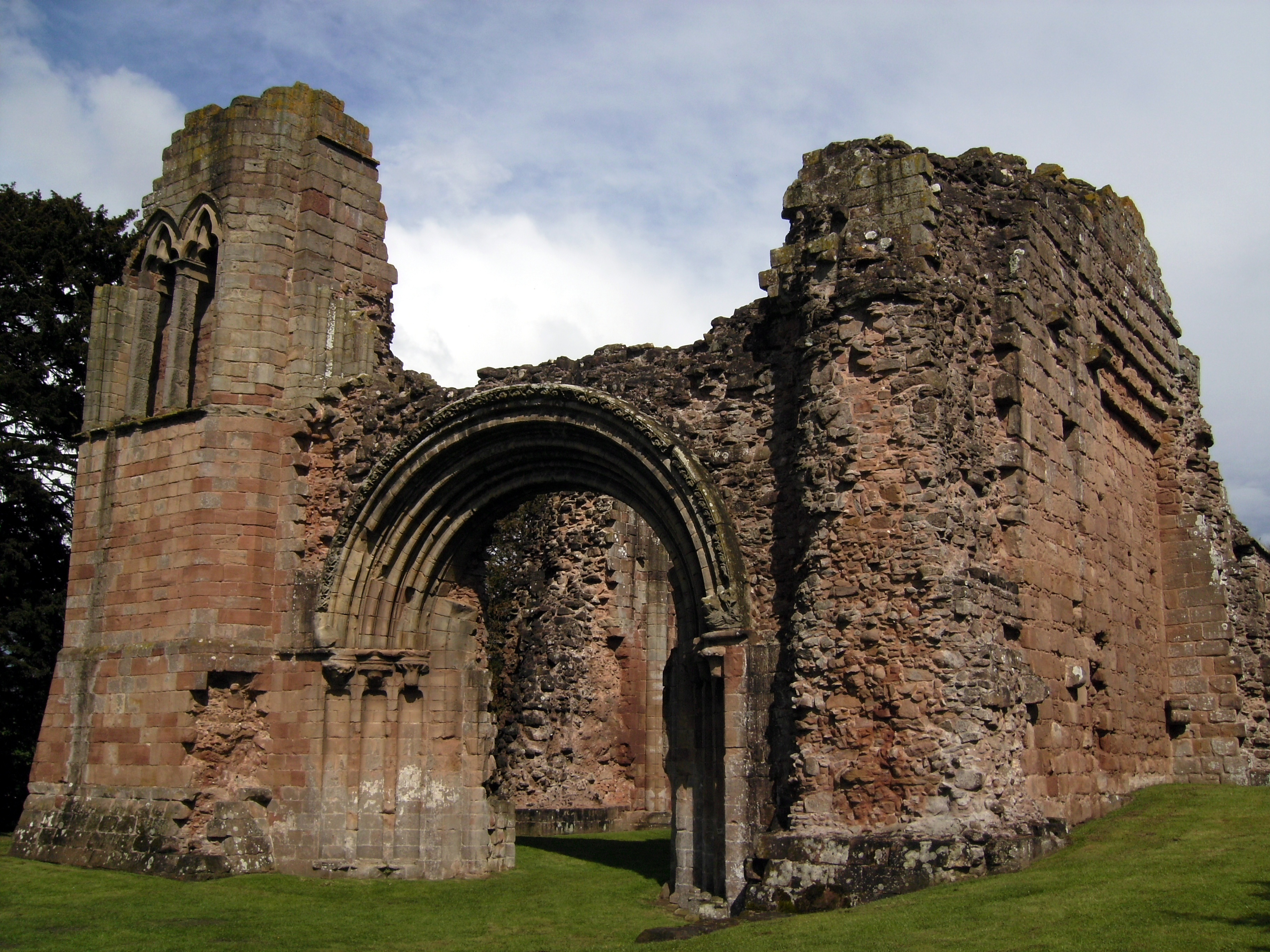
The western entrance to the church at Lilleshall Abbey

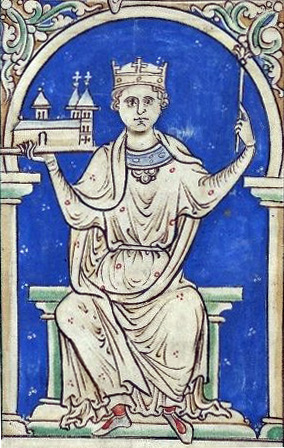
King Stephen.

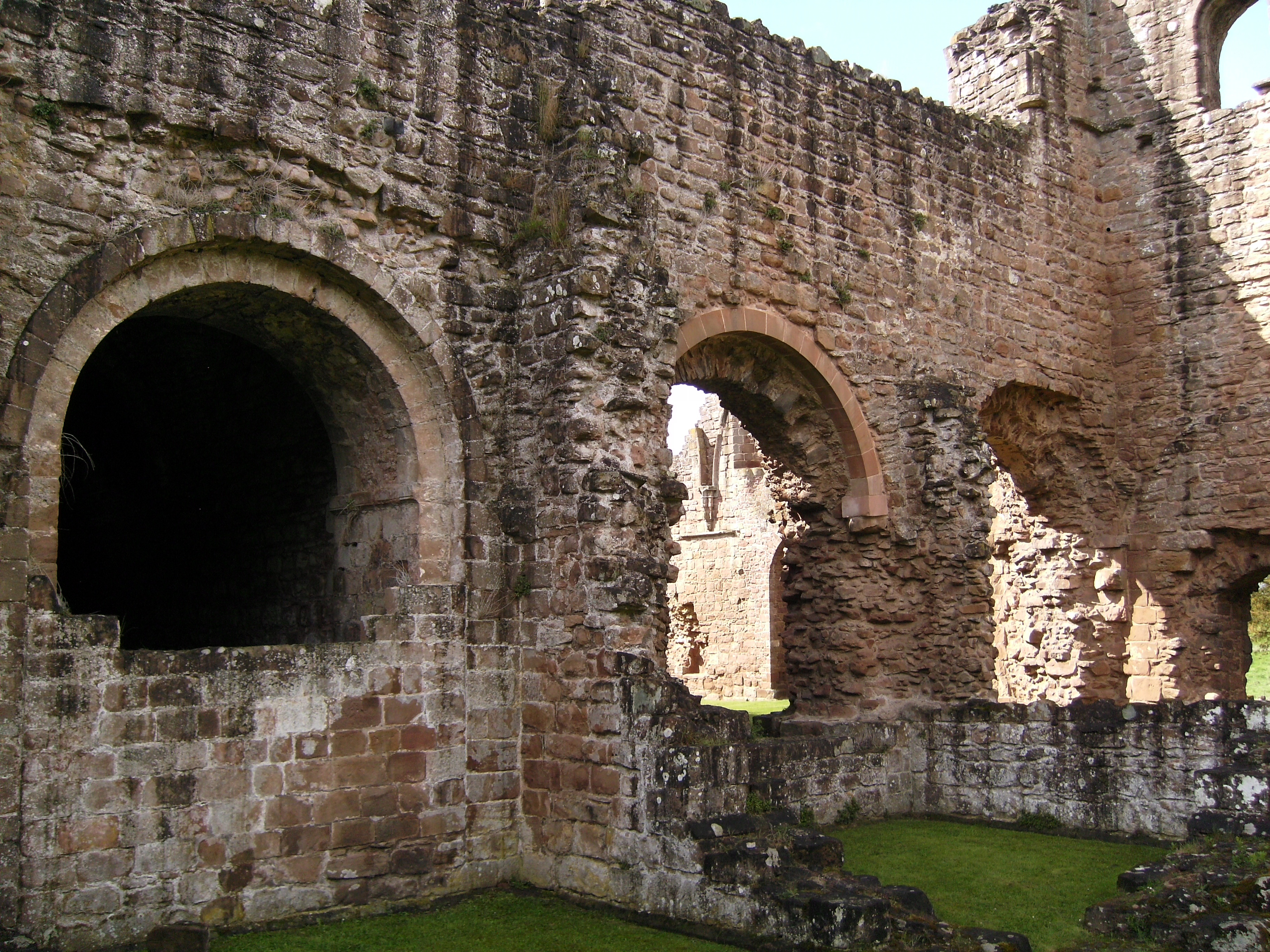
A view of the north wall of the chancel at Lilleshall.

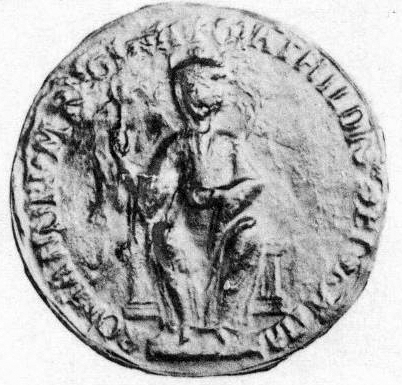
Empress Matilda's great seal

Richard, and his brother, Philip, lord of Tong, Shropshire, were instrumental in establishing Lilleshall Abbey, an important Augustinian house in Shropshire.

Richard was granted substantial estates in Shropshire by a charter of confirmation. This was issued by the king at Portsmouth in August 1127, probably while he was waiting to embark for Normandy. It covered four prebends of St Alkmund's collegiate church in Shrewsbury: Lilleshall, Atcham, Uckington and Preston Gubbals. The Domesday survey had found that these were in the hands of a cleric called Godebold, who seems, like Richard de Belmeis I, to have been close to Roger Mortimer, and who gave his name to Preston Gubbals. He was succeeded by his son, Robert, who probably sided with the revolt of Robert of Bellême, 3rd Earl of Shrewsbury, as the estates were granted by Henry I to the elder Richard. They were within the king's gift, as St Alkmund's was a royal foundation. However, they remained ecclesiastical estates, held in mortmain, and could not be alienated to an individual. The king's charter, addressed to the Bishop of Chester and to the barons of Shropshire, simultaneously honoured the memory of the faithful, deceased bishop; recognised his nephew as his spiritual heir; and reasserted the inalienability of the prebends as Church property in the gift of the king. It reaffirmed that these were lands which the Bishop of London "held from the king and which formerly belonged to Godebald and his son Robert." Richard became a canon of St Alkmund's and was later recognised as dean.

Richard's brother, Philip, already had a record as a benefactor of religious houses, particularly Buildwas Abbey, which was affiliated to the Congregation of Savigny (and later absorbed into the Cistercian Order). He was admitted to the Savignac lay fraternity. However, in the early 1140s he gave land at Lizard, Staffordshire, “to found a Church in honour of St. Mary for Canons of the Order of Arrouaise, who had come from the Church of St. Peter at Dorchester, and are serving God and St Mary there.” He also gave the canons the right to collect wood for fuel and for building and also donated two Leicestershire churches – at Blackfordby and Ashby-de-la-Zouch. These were Canons Regular who followed the rigorous practice of Arrouaise Abbey in northern France. Like all such canons, they were integrated into the Augustinian Order by a decree of the Second Council of the Lateran in 1139. They had been brought from their first house in England, at Dorchester on Thames, to attempt to establish a colony in Shropshire. This proved a struggle. As Lizard proved unviable, they moved first into Donnington Wood, near Wrockwardine, and then by 1148 to Lilleshall, where a substantial community was established. This was made possible by Richard, who carried through the dissolution of St Alkmund's college to invest its property in the new community.

The dissolution of St Alkmund's, a chapel royal, was only possible with royal assent. A charter was obtained from King Stephen, granted in 1145 at Bury St Edmunds. This not only confirmed Richard's donation of all his holdings to the canons but also promised the remaining prebends as they fell vacant. It was countersigned by Imar of Tusculum, the papal legate. Pope Eugenius III ordered Roger de Clinton, the Bishop of Coventry and Lichfield, to issue a charter confirming Richard's gift to the canons and Theobald of Bec, the Archbishop of Canterbury, subsequently also issued a confirmatory charter. The prevalence of the Anarchy made it essential to win the approval also of Stephen's opponents, initially Empress Matilda. She issued a confirmatory charter to the canons, now at Lilleshall, in 1148 - probably while she was at Falaise. Henry, Duke of Normandy, her son and heir, also gave his consent and repeated it when he became King Henry II.

=== Bishop of London ===
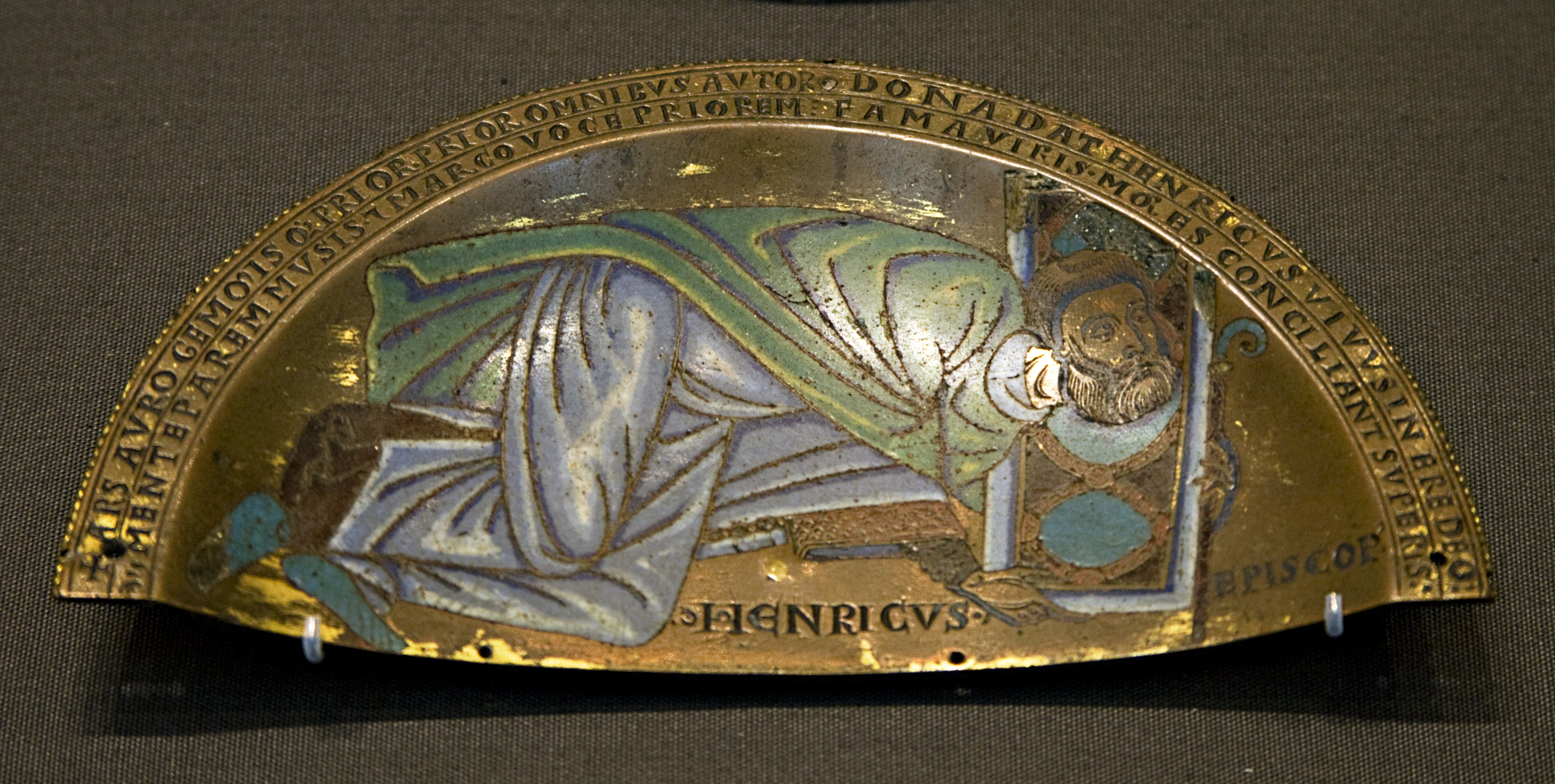
Henry of Blois, as depicted on a contemporary plaque, now in the British Museum. He not only ordained Richard as deacon but later sent a panegyric to his consecration as Bishop of London.

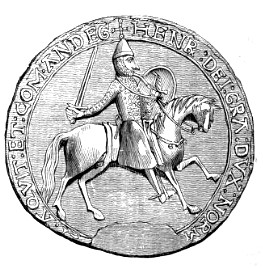
Henry II, depicted on his great seal

Richard was probably elected to the see of London by the chapter of St Paul's, where he could rely on the votes of family members and friends, in the spring of 1152. Robert de Sigello, his predecessor had died as early as September 1150, so there was a significant delay, which seems to have been the result of royal obstruction. King Stephen demanded £500 to countenance the chapter's right of free election. It is unclear whether this was the result of a simple desire to milk the church for money or whether the king resented Richard's election. He had certainly vacillated during the civil war. In the summer 1141 he is known have been in attendance on Matilda at Oxford, as he witnessed one of her charters confirming a grant of land to Haughmond Abbey, his name appearing next to that of the notorious Shropshire rebel William FitzAlan. One of those who rallied to his support was a relative: Gilbert Foliot, then Bishop of Hereford, who wrote a series of letters on his behalf. Papal approval seems to have been announced during the summer of 1152. However, the delay continued for further months.

As he was still a deacon, Richard was ordained a priest on 20 September by Theobald of Bec, the Archbishop of Canterbury. Finally, on 28 September, after a vacancy just short of two years, Theobald consecrated him bishop, with almost all the bishops of the English church attending the event. Bishop Henry of Winchester, the king's brother, who could not be present, wrote a letter to the Synod, praising Richard's elegance, courtesy, hard work and learning, with the wish that "the tree now planted in God's temple, with divine help, flourish and be fruitful." However, controversy continued. Richard had appointed Ralph de Diceto to replace himself as Archdeacon of Middlesex. However, Pope Eugene III had not been heard on the matter. His choice was John of Canterbury, who seems to have held the London prebend of St Pancras, as well as serving as clerk to Archbishop Theobald. The issue was an embarrassment to Richard but it was resolved when John was made treasurer to the Archbishop of York in 1153.

Little is known of Richard's episcopate, although he seems to have been industrious in the administrative and legal aspects of his post. Eyton thought he was involved in the negotiations of 1153 between Stephen and the future Henry II that settled the succession. He attended Henry's coronation on 19 December 1154. It was he who baptised Prince Henry, the first surviving son of the king and Eleanor of Aquitaine, who was born on 28 February 1155. Toward the end of his life, between 1160 and 1162, he established the post of Treasurer for his diocese, a notable administrative reform. His last recorded public appearance was when he attended the king's court at Colchester on 24 May 1157.

== Death ==
During his last years Richard was afflicted by a disorder that affected his speech, possibly a stroke, and it may be that it had a similar cause to the paralysis that affected his uncle. He was also heavily in debt. He died on 4 May 1162.

== Citations ==
Catholic Church titles
Preceded by Robert de Sigello	Bishop of London; 1152–1162	Succeeded by Gilbert Foliot
Preceded by Roger, son of Robert	Archdeacon of Middlesex; Before 1127, 1138-1152	Succeeded by Ralph de Diceto; John of Canterbury
