= Anselm of St Saba =

12th-century Bishop of London-elect

- Bishop of London elect
- Elected: about 22 March 1136
- Installed: 1137
- Term ended: 1138
- Predecessor: Gilbert Universalis
- Successor: Robert de Sigello
- Other post: Abbot of Bury St. Edmunds

Orders
- Consecration: never consecrated

Personal details
- Died: 3 January 1148
- Denomination: Catholic

Anselm (Note: Latin: Anselmus; also known as Dom Anselm, Anselm of St Saba for his first monastery, or Anselm of Bury for his second.) (died 1148) was a medieval bishop of London whose election was quashed by Pope Innocent II. He was a monk of Chiusa, abbot of Saint Saba in Rome, papal legate to England, and abbot of Bury St Edmunds.

== Biography ==
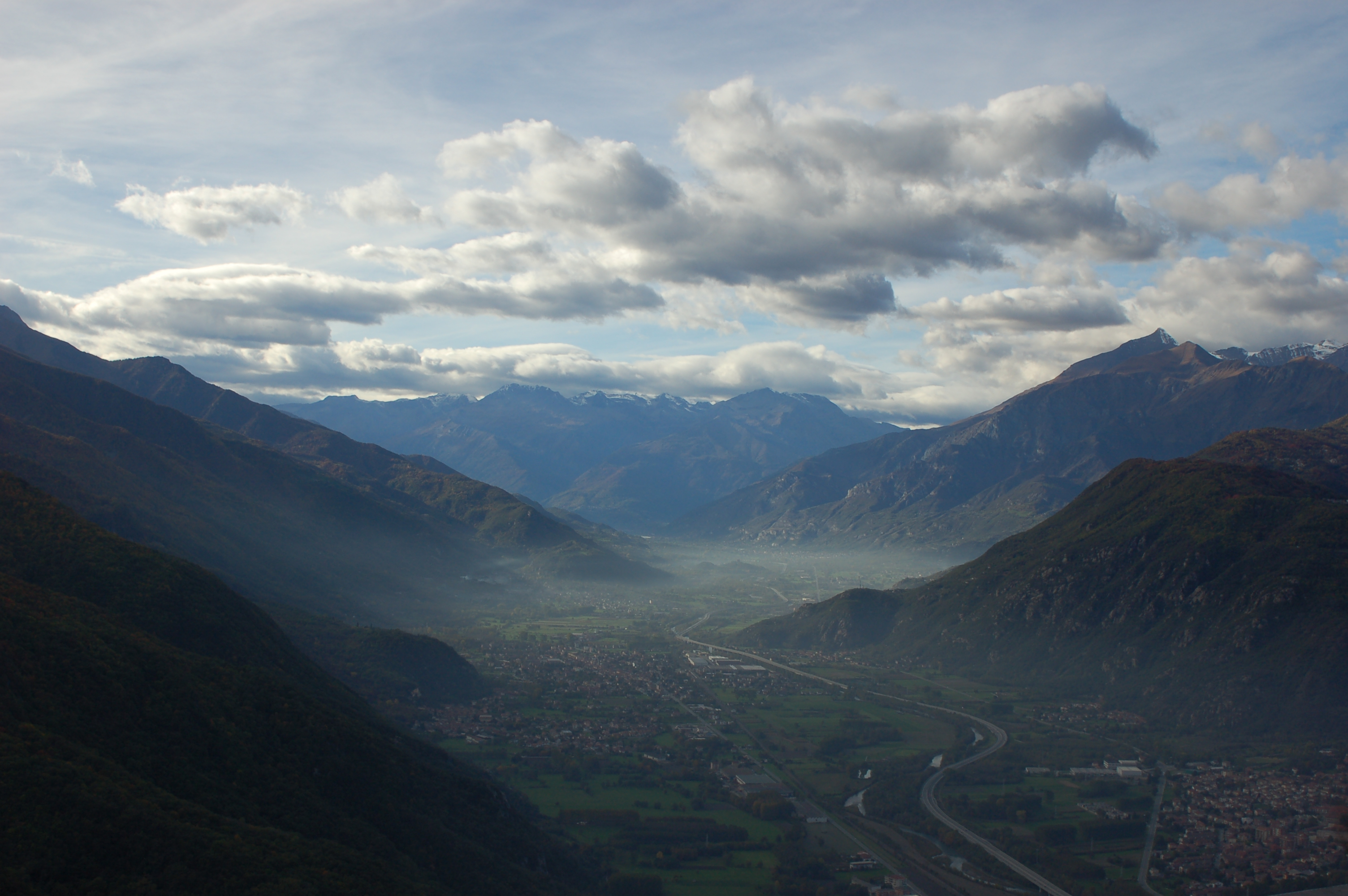
The Val di Susa from St Michael's Abbey.

Anselm was the son of a nobleman named Burgundius and his wife Richeza or Richera, the much younger sister of Anselm, archbishop of Canterbury. Anselm was dedicated to a clerical life from a young age despite all his siblings having died in birth or in childhood. He joined the Benedictine abbey of Saint Michael's on Mount Pirchiriano overlooking Chiusa in the March of Susa. Anselm visited the abbey with his chaplain and biographer Eadmer during Easter in 1098 and brought the young man with them to Lyon, where he suffered but recovered from a grave illness. His father Burgundius seems to have wanted to profit from his brother-in-law's high position but St Anselm "warned him off in no uncertain terms" and he instead took the cross, journeying as a pilgrim or warrior to the Holy Land amid the ongoing First Crusade. He then died or never returned, leaving Anselm's uncle to provide for the family. St Anselm watched over his nephew's ecclesiastical career from afar and sent him some letters of guidance, but his attempt to enroll his sister in the Cluniac nunnery at Marcigny was successfully blocked by his nephew's abbot at Chiusa, presumably because he did not want to endanger his own abbey's inheritance of the family's remaining estates.

After his uncle's death, Anselm was elected abbot of Saint Saba monastery in Rome. He served as papal legate to England twice between 1115 and 1119. In 1121, he was elected abbot of Bury St Edmunds. He was elected to the see of London about 22 March 1136 and was enthroned in 1137, but his election was quashed by Pope Innocent II in 1138. He then returned to Bury St Edmunds. Despite noting Anselm's importance in establishing the Feast of the Immaculate Conception, Southern was of the opinion that the young Anselm "was not a very bright young man" and owed his position "entirely to the fame of his uncle".

Anselm died on 3 January 1148.

== Legacy ==
Anselm wanted to make the pilgrimage to Santiago de Compostela but was talked out of the trip by his monks. Instead, he had a church to St James built in the abbey, which may have been the first such church in England.

== Citations ==
Catholic Church titles
Preceded by Gilbert Universalis	Bishop of London election quashed 1136–1138	Succeeded by Robert de Sigello
