= Gilbert Universalis =

12th-century Bishop of London

- Bishop of London
- Elected: December 1127
- Term ended: 9 August 1134
- Predecessor: Richard de Beaumis
- Successor: Anselm of St Saba

Orders
- Consecration: 22 January 1128

Personal details
- Died: 9 August 1134
- Denomination: Catholic

Gilbert Universalis or Gilbertus Universalis (Note: English: Gilbert the Universal) (died 1134) was a medieval Bishop of London.

== Life ==
Gilbert was elected to the see of London about December 1127. He was consecrated on 22 January 1128. He died on 9 August 1134. His death was commemorated on 9 August.

== Works ==
Gilbert the Universal worked on the so-called Glossa ordinaria, a compilation of what historically prominent commentators had written on the books of the Bible. Gilbert also compiled the Gloss on Lamentations. He is particularly notable for developing the previous compilation of Paschasius Radbertus on Lamentations into an argument for the Christian use of Ciceronian rhetoric.

== Citations ==
Catholic Church titles
Preceded by Richard de Beaumis	Bishop of London; 1128–1134	Succeeded by Anselm of St Saba
