= Richard de Belmeis I =

12th-century Bishop of London

Richard de Belmeis
- Bishop of London
- Elected: 24 May 1108
- Term ended: 1127
- Predecessor: Maurice
- Successor: Gilbert Universalis

Orders
- Ordination: 14 June 1108
- Consecration: 26 July 1108

Personal details
- Died: 16 January 1127 St Osyth
- Denomination: Roman Catholic

Richard de Belmeis I (or de Beaumais) (died 1127) was a medieval cleric, administrator, judge and politician. Beginning as a minor landowner and steward in Shropshire, he became Henry I's chief agent in the Welsh Marches and in 1108 was appointed Bishop of London. He founded St Osyth's Priory in Essex and was succeeded by a considerable dynasty of clerical politicians and landowners.

== Identity ==
Richard's toponymic byname is given in modern accounts as de Belmeis. Occasionally the form de Beaumais is encountered. This is based on the modern spelling of the village from which his family perhaps originated: Beaumais-sur-Dive, which is east of Falaise, in the Calvados region of Normandy. The attribution is now regarded as not fully proven. It is made up of two very common French toponym elements, meaning “attractive estate”: there is a village called Aubermesnil-Beaumais elsewhere in Normandy.

Whatever the form of his name, Richard is easily confused with his namesake and nephew, Richard de Belmeis II, who was also a 12th-century Bishop of London. Tout refers to Richard I by the surname Rufus, which creates further confusion. His epitaph shows that he was called Rufus, but the name, in the form Ruffus, is now generally reserved for an Archdeacon of Essex a brother of Richard Belmeis II and thus another nephew of Richard Belmeis I. A further, later, Richard Ruffus may have been a son of the archdeacon. The family tree below attempts to clarify the relationships, which are still not beyond doubt.

== Background and early life ==
Richard's background seems to lie in the lower reaches of the Norman landowning class. He is thought to be the Richard whom the Domesday enquiry found holding the very small manor of Meadowley, due west of Bridgnorth in Shropshire. This he held as a tenant of Helgot, who held it of Roger Montgomery, the great territorial magnate who dominated the Welsh Marches. Meadowley was 6 ploughlands in extent and was populated by just five families: 3 slaves and 2 bordars. However, there were evidently signs of revival in Richard's hands. In Edward the Confessor's time it had been worth 30 shillings, but it had sunk to only 2 shillings by the time Richard acquired it, since when it had risen again to 11 shillings. Richard also held three hides worth of land as a tenant of Helgot at Preen, to the north-west of Meadowley. Here he let a hide to Godebold, a priest who was a crony of Earl Roger. Godebold at this time was much wealthier than Richard and held a large number of properties that had been intended as prebends of the collegiate church of St Alkmund in Shrewsbury.

Richard seems to have become steward of Earl Roger and appears as a witness in charters, both genuine and spurious, granted by Roger and his son, Hugh to Shrewsbury Abbey, and in one is described as dapifer for Shropshire. Richard also seems to have been employed in Sussex, where the Montgomery earls had substantial holdings.

== Viceroy of Shropshire ==
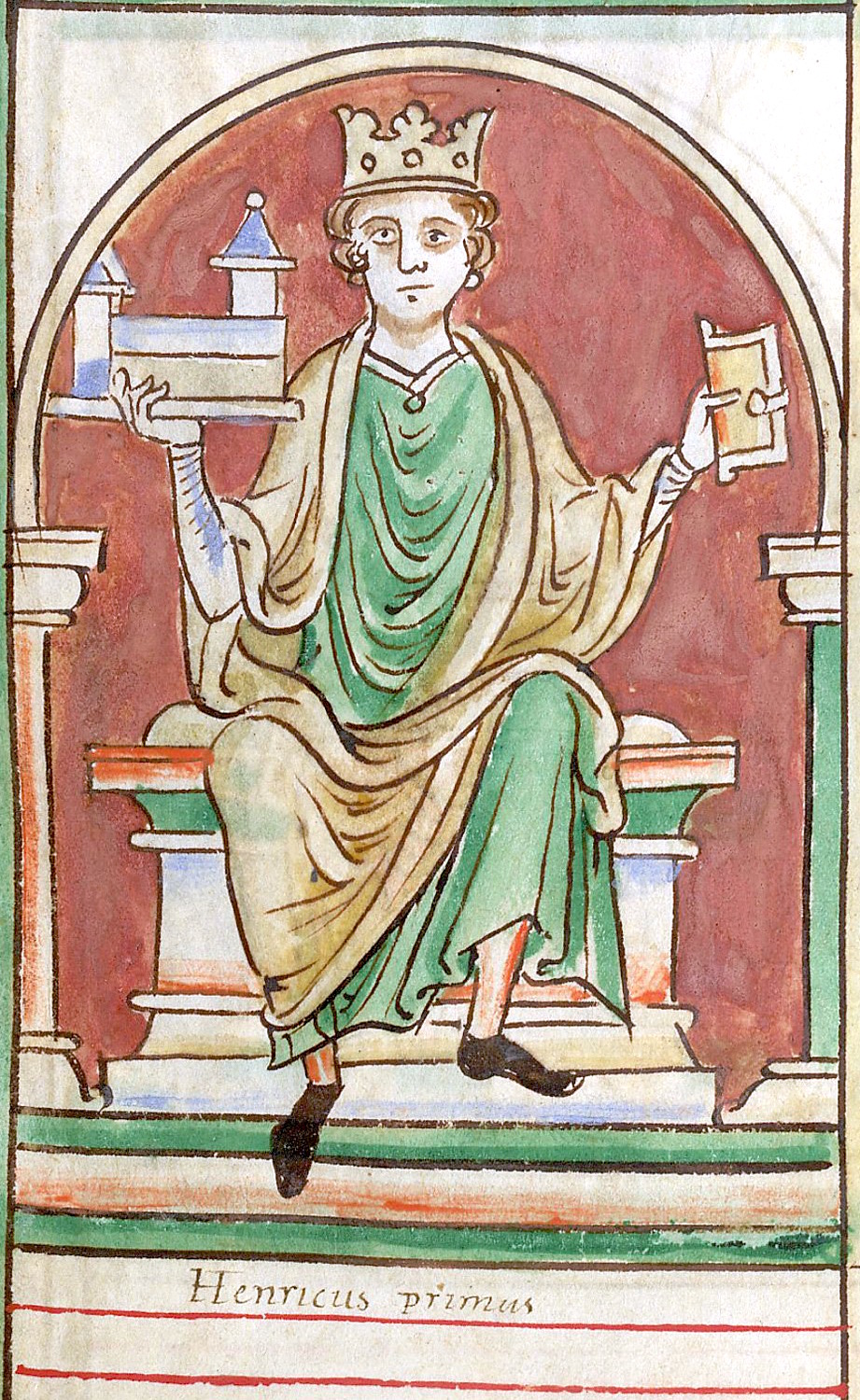
Henry I. Richard's position was almost entirely the result of Henry's patronage.

Richard seems to have avoided entanglement in the revolt of Robert of Bellême, 3rd Earl of Shrewsbury, and consequently emerged in Henry I's favour. Probably in autumn 1102, Henry ordered “Richard de Belmes”, Robert of Falaise and all the barons of Sussex to secure for Ralph de Luffa, the Bishop of Chichester, lands near the town of Chichester. It seems, therefore, that Richard was not in Shropshire at that time, but in Sussex. He was probably sent to Shrewsbury late in 1102, after Henry had dealt with Robert of Bellême's Welsh allies, imprisoning Iorwerth ap Bleddyn, a powerful Welsh leader who had played a prominent but equivocal part in events. Henry continued to treat Shropshire as a marcher lordship but was determined not to install another earl who might threaten the monarchy. Probably at Christmas, Henry ordered Richard to help secure some land for the Abbey of Saint-Remi, which had a daughter house at Lapley Priory in Staffordshire and estates in Shropshire. This would indicate that he was fully in charge of Shropshire by the end of the year. However, the sequence of events is not certain.

Henry allowed Richard to take effective control of the county as a royal agent. He was described by Ordericus Vitalis as the vicecomes or “viscount” of Shropshire, a term sometimes translated as Viceroy. It is possible that he was addressed on occasion as the Sheriff of Shropshire. He had a reputation as an expert on legal matters. Hence he served as the justiciar for the king at Shrewsbury, where his brief also included oversight of Welsh affairs. He was given substantial holdings in the county to support him in appropriate style. The priest Godebold had been succeeded by a son, Robert, and it seems likely that he had supported the rebels, as his estates were turned over to Richard. Other estates he acquired were Tong and Donington, both of which had been retained as demesne by the Montgomery earls themselves. Despite his focus on Shropshire, the king seems to have continued regarding Richard as a Sussex magnate: as late as 1107 he heads a list of Sussex notables informed of the king's confirmation of the right of Chichester Cathedral to hold a fair in the town.

As Henry's viceroy, Richard made a considerable impact on the county. On occasion he convened and presided over ecclesiastical synods: Even after he became Bishop of London, he had no obvious authority for doing this, as Shropshire fell within the Diocese of Lichfield. His decisions at assemblies at Wistanstow in 1110 and Castle Holdgate in 1115 greatly increased the powers and privileges of Wenlock Priory by recognising it as the mother church of an extensive parish and made it an important force in the region. Richard granted his land at Preen to Wenlock Priory and this was later used to found a daughter house.

== Bishop of London ==
=== Election and consecration ===
Anselm. As depicted on his seal.

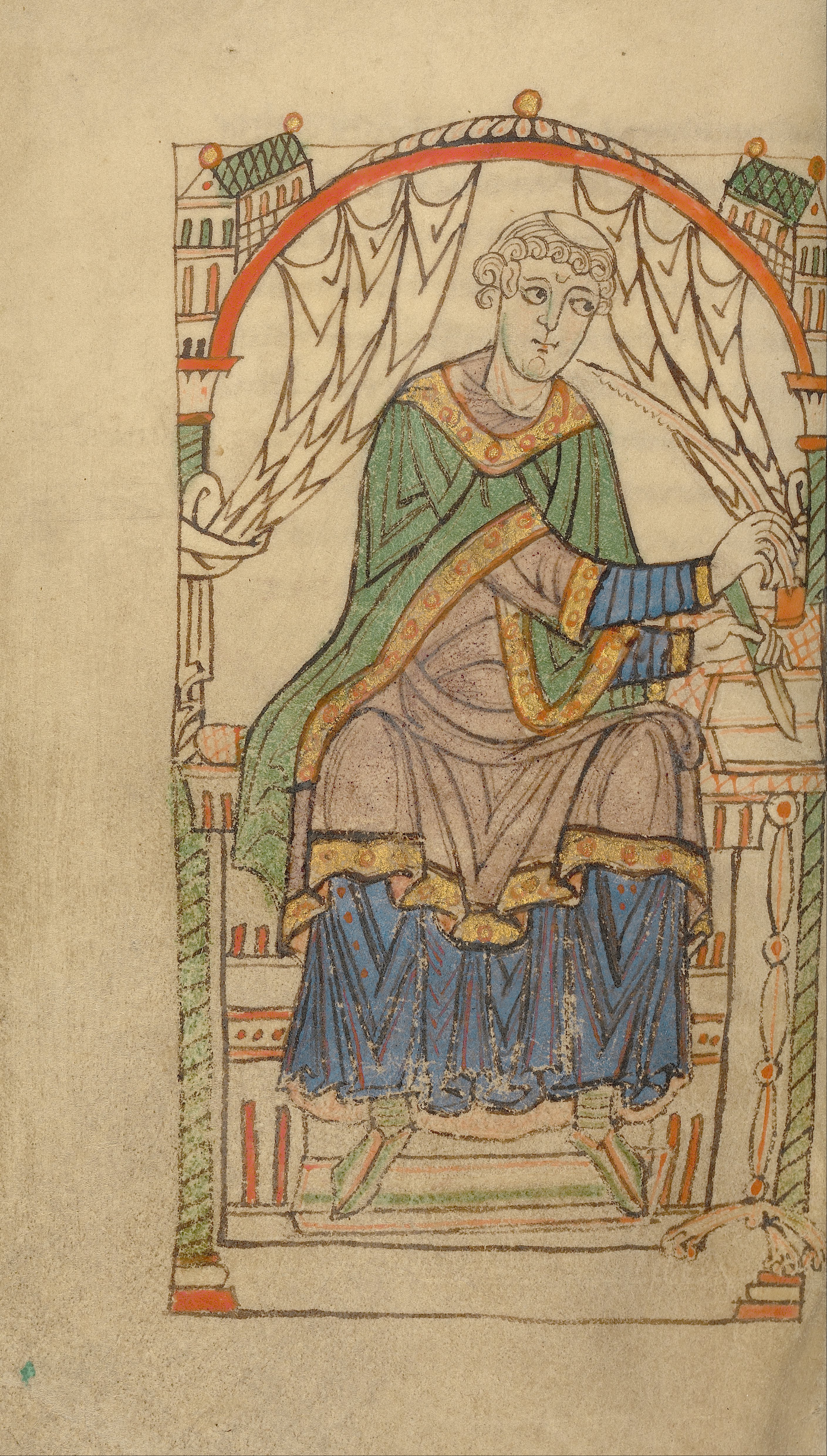
Eadmer, the historian who is the main source for details of Richard's ordination as priest and bishop.

Richard was elected to the see of London and invested with its temporalities on 24 May 1108. The date is known from Eadmer, the contemporary historian and biographer of Anselm, who places Richard's election at Pentecost: 24 May in that year, according to the Julian Calendar, in which Easter was on 5 April. The king's confirmation affirms that he is granted “the see of London with the lands and men pertaining to it, and the castle of Stortford.” Shortly afterwards, Henry restored to the canons of St Paul's a range of judicial powers and privileges they had enjoyed in the reign of Edward the Confessor.

It appears that he had so far been ordained only as a deacon. Ordination as a priest was required before Richard could proceed to ordination as a bishop. Eadmer makes clear that he was ordained as a priest with many others by Anselm, the Archbishop of Canterbury, at his manor of Mortlake. Anselm had only recently returned from a long exile after he and the king came to a resolution of their Investiture Controversy, and it seems that there was a backlog of ordinations. Eadmer does not give a date as such but says that Anselm carried out these ordinations during jejunio quarti mensis - the “fast of the fourth months,” i.e. the Ember Days, which were the Wednesday, Friday and Saturday following Pentecost. Eyton reasoned that the ordination would therefore have been on 27, 29 or 30 May. However, Fasti Ecclesiae Anglicani gives the probable date as 14 June 1108, nevertheless citing Eadmer as evidence.

Richard was fairly typical of the men made bishops, even after Henry had made substantial concessions to the Church. Citing Richard as an example, Poole comments: “Piety in matters of religion was seldom the primary qualification in the election of bishops; the continued to be normally men of affairs, administrators, chosen for their experience in conducting the king's business.” What followed made clear that Richard was essentially a royal nominee, not really known, much less congenial, to Anselm and the supporters of Gregorian Reform. Eadmer says that the king went to embark for Normandy and waited until he received a blessing from Anselm, who then became very ill and was confined to his quarters. The king then sent William Giffard, the Bishop of Winchester and William Warelwast, the Bishop of Exeter, who had taken opposite sides in the investiture dispute, to urging Anselm to look after his son and the kingdom and to make sure that Richard was soon ordained bishop at Chichester. The reason he gave was that Richard was a man of great ability for whom he had important business in the far west of the country. Anselm did expedite Richard's consecration as a bishop, which took place on 26 July 1108. However, he demurred at using Chichester Cathedral, preferring instead to use his own chapel at Pagham, assisted by the bishops of Winchester, Chichester and Exeter, together with Roger of Salisbury, the Bishop of Salisbury.

=== Primacy dispute ===
One of Richard's concerns was to promote the interests of the Archdiocese of Canterbury, of which his own see formed a part. A dispute over the primacy between Canterbury and York had already dragged on for some years. Anselm had been granted a personal primacy over the whole English church by the Papacy. However, Thomas, archbishop-elect of York since May 1108 had used various stratagems to delay his own consecration, as it was clear Anselm was near to death. In May 1109, Anselm died and at Pentecost the king convened his court in London, where the bishops demanded that Thomas accept consecration. This was a unanimous call, including even Samson, the Bishop of Worcester, who was Thomas's father. Accordingly, Thomas was brought to consecration at St Paul's, Richard's seat, on 27 June. Seven bishops were scheduled to take part: Richard himself, William Giffard of Winchester, Ralph d'Escures, the Bishop of Rochester, Herbert de Losinga, the Bishop of Norwich, Ralph of Chichester, Ranulf Flambard, the Bishop of Durham, and Hervey le Breton, the king's confessor, currently unable to fulfil his role as Bishop of Bangor but a bishop nevertheless. However, Richard refused to participate until Thomas had made a written profession of subordination. According to Eadmer, this was a comprehensive surrender of the primacy to Canterbury:

Ego Thomas, Eboracensis ecclesiae consecrandus metropolitanus, profiteor subjectionem et canonicam oboedientiam sanctae Dorobernensi ecclesiae et ejusdem ecclesiae primati canonico electo et consecrato, et successoribus suis canonice inthronizatis...

Translation:

I, Thomas, consecrated metropolitan of the church of York, profess subjection and canonical obedience to the holy church of Canterbury and to the canonically elected and consecrated primate of that church, and to his canonically enthroned successors...

However, doubt was to return later about the wording. Once the required formalities had been carried out, Richard pronounced himself satisfied and the consecration went ahead, with Thomas subsequently receiving a pallium from the Papal legate.

Richard was still determined to pursue his campaign against Thomas, and raised the issue of who should say mass before the king at the Christmas court of 1109, which was held in London. Still an archbishop and a primate, Thomas claimed to be the senior bishop in the country because of the continuing vacancy at Canterbury. However, Richard claimed to be the senior bishop and dean of the Province of Canterbury, and thus the archbishop's deputy. Moreover, his predecessor Maurice had been the one to crown Henry in 1100, when there was no Archbishop of Canterbury available. Richard celebrated the mass but the argument was pursued with renewed vigour, actually at the king's dinner table, until Henry sent both bishops home and remitted the issue to the future archbishop of Canterbury. Tout thought that Richard himself had aspirations to become archbishop, although it was not to be. Ralph d'Escures was already acquiring administrative authority within the province and, after prolonged wrangling, was to emerge as the next archbishop.

=== Episcopal business ===
Richard took part in settling numerous ecclesiastical and secular matters of his day. He was a witness to the king's writ recognising the establishment of the Diocese of Ely: this had been discussed for some time and adopted as policy by Anselm, but papal approval arrived only in 1109. Hervey le Breton, displaced from Bangor by the resurgence of the Kingdom of Gwynedd, was translated to the new see, which was created by the partition of the Diocese of Lincoln.

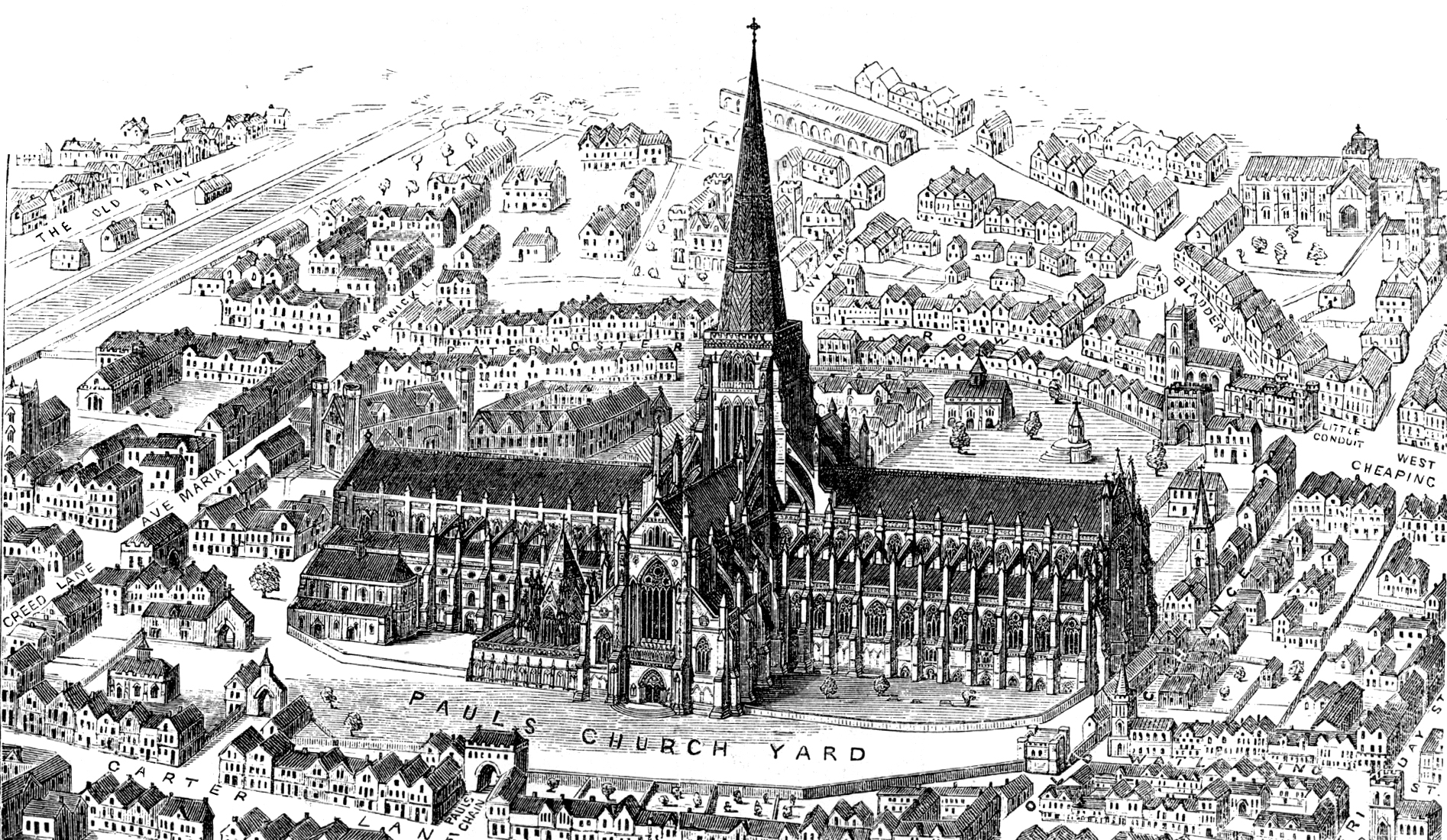
Old St Paul's. The cathedral was only slowly rebuilt after the fire of 1086 and not rededicated until 1240

Richard attended the king when he was waiting to embark for Normandy in 1111 and 1114. On 27 June 1115 he was at the enthronement of Ralph d'Escures as Archbishop of Canterbury. On 28 December that year he accompanied the king and queen to the consecration of St Albans Abbey. He participated in the consecration of several other bishops. On 4 April 1120 it was when David the Scot, a new Bishop of Bangor agreed upon by Henry I and Gruffudd ap Cynan, was consecrated at Westminster Abbey; on 16 January 1121, when Richard de Capella was consecrated Bishop of Hereford at Lambeth; and on 2 October that year, in the same church, when Gregory or Gréne was consecrated Bishop of Dublin. On 6 February 1123 he was prevented by paralysis from officiating when his protégé William de Corbeil was consecrated Archbishop of Canterbury.

William de Corbeil or Curboil had been for some years the Prior of St Osyth's Priory, an Augustinian house founded by Richard at the village of Chich in Essex. The king confirmed Richard's grant of the manor to the priory around 1117–9. The priory was dedicated to a legendary Anglo-Saxon nun and martyr. It was only one of his great building projects, although important to him personally and intended to provide a mausoleum and chantry for himself. The rebuilding of St Paul's was a much bigger project he inherited with the see of London from Maurice, his predecessor, as the previous building had been destroyed by fire. Ordericus Vitalis portrays his efforts as enthusiastic and determined, very nearly bringing the work to completion. This was possibly true initially. However, William of Malmesbury believed that Maurice had committed the diocese to a scheme that was too ambitious and that Richard was damaged not only in wealth but in mental health by the enormity of the task, ultimately despairing of the burden. Nevertheless, he is celebrated as the founder of St Paul's Cathedral School, which was to provide an education for its choristers in the succeeding centuries, slowly evolving into distinct choral and grammar schools.

Richard was the recipient of significant small tokens of royal favour. Probably in 1114 the king notified Hugh de Bocland that Richard was henceforth to receive the tithe of venison from Essex that had previously been a royal prerogative. Rather later was a grant to Richard and his cathedral of “the whole of the great fish caught on their land, except the tongue, which he reserves for himself.” Apparently this referred to porpoises.

== Welsh affairs ==
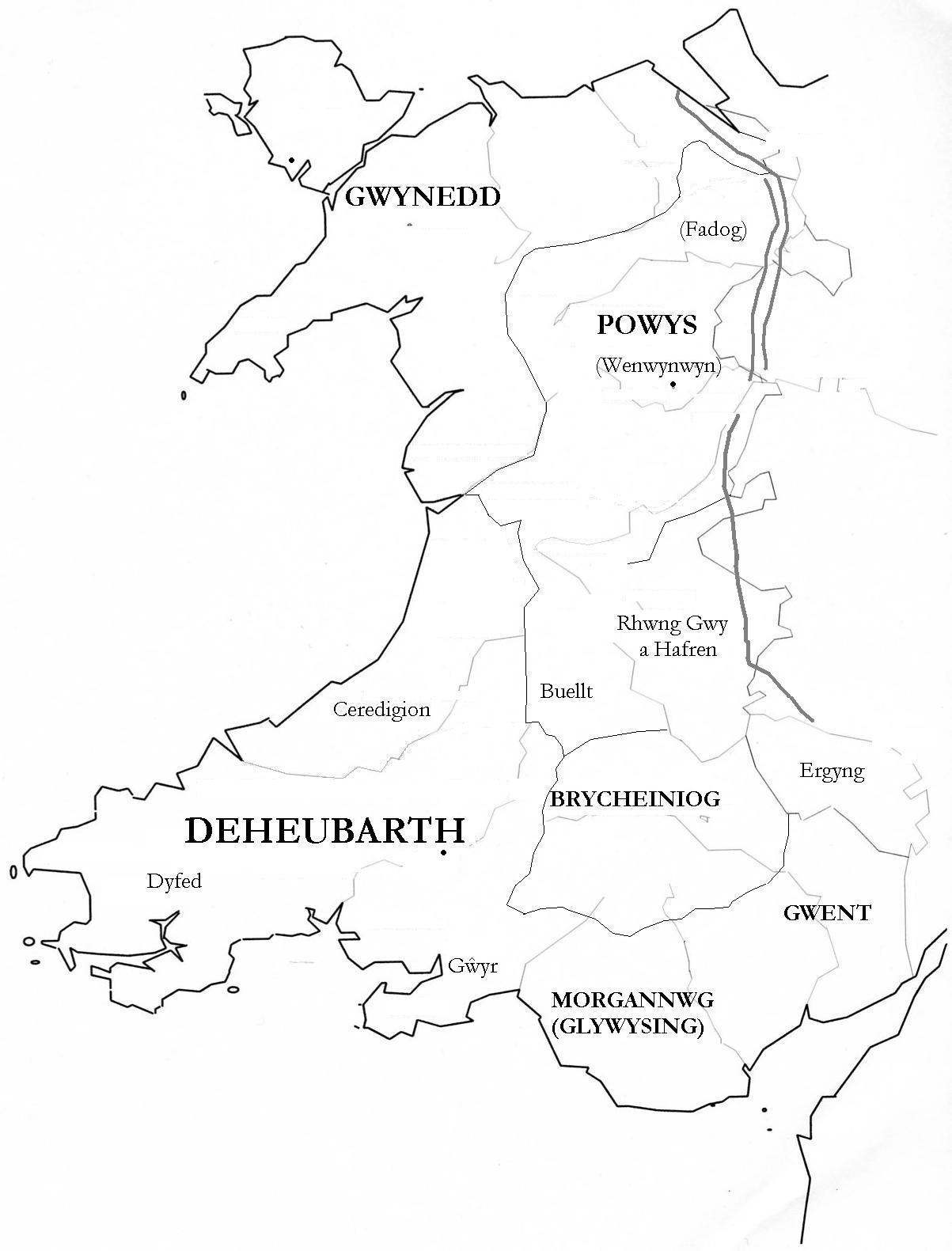
Medieval Wales

Richard's best-documented interventions in Wales date from the period immediately after his elevation to the episcopate in 1108. Richard's meddling in the complex dynastic politics of Wales was not always successful and Lloyd comments that “Bishop Richard was cynically indifferent to the crimes of Welshmen against each other.” The imprisonment of Iorwerth had left a partial power vacuum in Powys, which his brother Cadwgan ap Bleddyn was unable to fill. Initially these were precipitated by Owain ap Cadwgan's abduction of Nest ferch Rhys in 1109, which had profound repercussions across Wales, as she was both the wife of Gerald de Windsor, the most powerful Norman baron in South Wales and the daughter of Rhys ap Tewdwr, the last Welsh ruler of Deheubarth. The widespread sense of outrage created a coalition of Welsh leaders against Owain and Cadygan. Richard was able to use this groundswell to send his forces and their allies across Central Wales, driving Owain and Cadwgan back into Ceredigion, then further into exile in Ireland. Richard partitioned the fugitives' land among his allies and in 1110 Iorwerth was released from seven years' captivity to create a new centre of power and authority.

However, Richard ordered one of his allies, Madog ap Rhiryd, to surrender some English criminals whom he was sheltering, alienating him from the new order. When Owain returned from exile, Madog immediately defected to his side and accompanied him in pillaging along the border. This led to hostilities with Iorwerth, who kept his bargain with Richard and the king, driving the outlaws from his realms. However, Owain continued his depredations from further west and Madog returned to corner and kill Iorwerth, driving him at spear-point into his blazing home. Richard dealt with each disaster by restoring relations with the perpetrators. Initially he reinstated Cadwgan in power, accepting Owain's return. When Madog murdered Cadwgan, Richard responded by granting substantial lands to him. Owain seems to have sidestepped the local conflict by making contact with the king personally. Succeeding his father in Powys, he was able in 1113 to blind Madog in revenge for his father's murder and to survive a full-scale royal invasion in the following year. Eyton comments on Richard's part in these events: “The grossest treachery seems to have pervaded this part of his policy.”

== Death ==
Richard seems to have given up his political functions in his last years. Eyton thought it likely he retired to his Priory of St Osyth in Essex. Certainly he died there.

On his deathbed, Richard confessed that he had lied about his tenure of a manor, previously testifying that he held it in fee, when in reality he had it under a lease. This was the manor of Betton in Berrington, to the south of Shrewsbury, which had been given to Shrewsbury Abbey soon after its foundation by Robert de Limesey, then Bishop of Chester Richard cleared up the matter through his confessors: William de Mareni, his own nephew and Dean of St Paul's, and Fulk, the prior of St Osyth's. Fulk clarified the situation in letters to the king, the Archbishop and other notables. Although Richard directed that the estate be restored to the abbey, its status was contested by his successors for decades: by Philip de Belmeis in 1127, although he quickly defaulted; a few decades later by his younger son, Ranulph, who ultimately recognised the abbey's rights in return for acceptance into its fraternity; in 1212 by Roger de la Zouche, who continued his suit for years unsuccessfully. Richard also restored to the abbey the advowson of the churches at Donington and Tong: these too were to be contested in the future.

Richard died in 1127, with his death being commemorated on 16 January, so he probably died on that date. He was buried at the Priory of St Osyth. His epitaph, on a marble tomb, read:

Hic jacet Richardus Beauveis, cognomine Rufus, London : Episcopus, vir probus et grandaevus, per totam vitam laboriosus, fundator noster religiosus, et qui multa bona nobis et ministris ecclesiae suae Sancti Pauli contulit. Obiit xvi Januarii, mcxxvii. Cujus animae propitietur Altissimus.

Translation:

Here lies Richard Beauveis, surnamed Ruddy, Bishop of London, an upright and very old man, industrious throughout his life, our pious founder, who bestowed numerous good things on us and on the ministers of his church, St Paul's. He died 16 January 1127. May the Highest be satisfied with his soul.

== Family ==
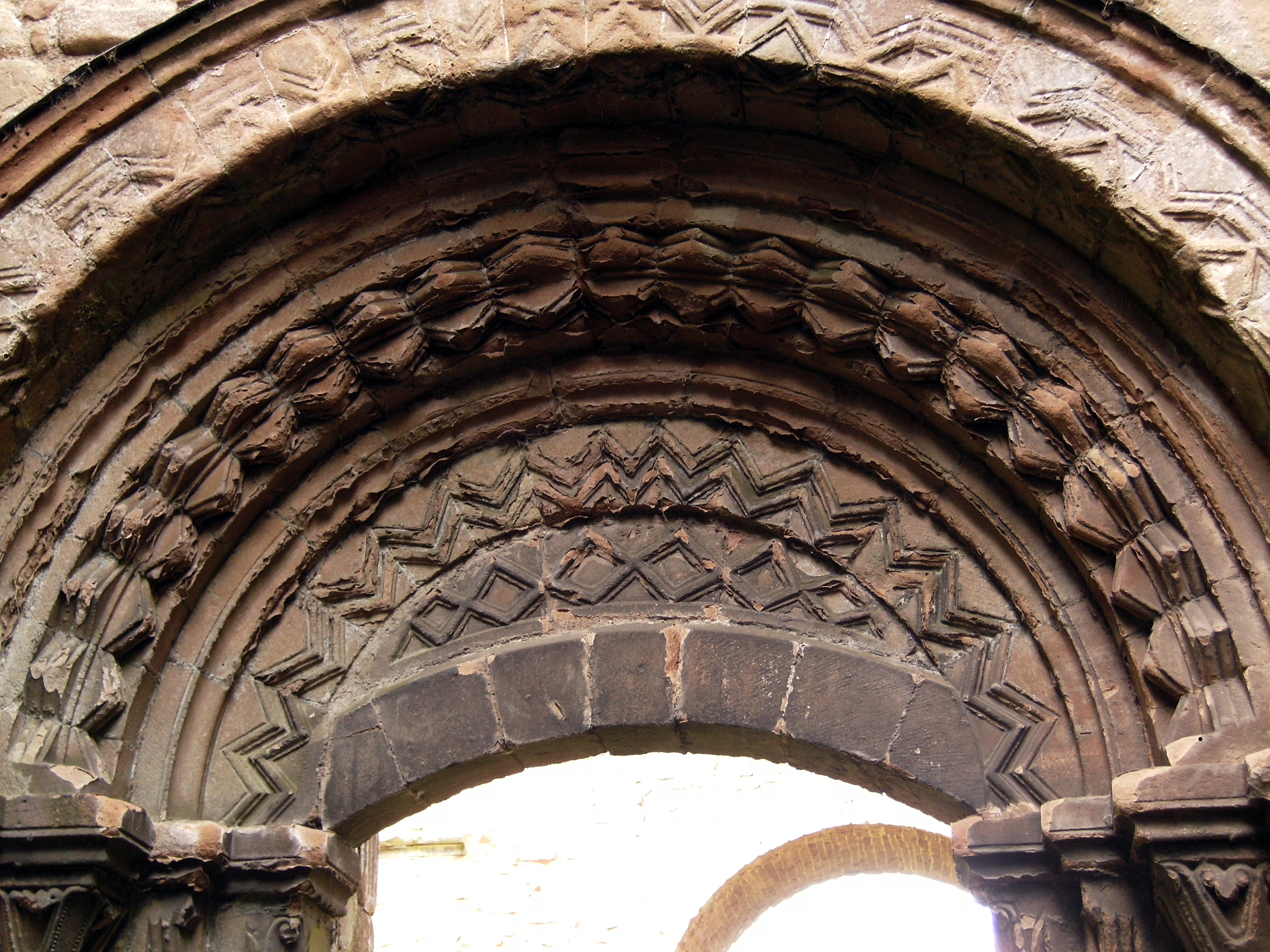
Tympanum over the south processional entrance to Lilleshall Abbey. Richard de Belmeis's nephews were able to endow the abbey from their large inheritance.

Richard became the originator of both ecclesiastical and secular dynasties. He had at least two sons, Walter and William. Walter was a canon of London, holding the prebend of Newington, and William was Archdeacon of London.

However, his nephews, heirs who could be legally acknowledged, were recipients of much greater benefits. The sons of two sisters, Ralph de Langford and William de Mareni, both pursued distinguished careers in the Diocese of London and in turn became Dean of St Paul's. Sons of his brother Robert received still more. Philip became his secular heir in the Midlands, receiving the substantial and lucrative estates at Tong and Donington. Philip's younger brother, Richard de Belmeis II received a royal grant of his prebends of St Alkmund's church, Shrewsbury, and the pair were able to found and endow another great Augustinian house: Lilleshall Abbey in Shropshire. However, both Philip's sons died young, after successively inheriting the estates, which then passed through their sister Adelicia and her husband, Alan de la Zouche, to the Barons Zouche. Richard later became Bishop of London. Richard Ruffus, their brother, apparently sharing his uncle's complexion, was archdeacon of Essex in the diocese of London, and had two sons who were canons of St Paul's. Another brother, Robert seems to have been the ancestor of the later Belmeis landowning dynasty. His son, William, was a canon of St Paul's and prebendary of St Pancras, but it is unclear whether he or a brother was Robert's temporal heir.

=== Family tree ===
The Belmeis family

Based on genealogy given by Eyton, corrected and supplemented by reference to Fasti Ecclesiae Anglicanae.

Unknown de Belmeis
Unknown de Langford	Unknown de Belmeis	Unknown de Mareni	Avelina de Belmeis	Richard de Belmeis I, Bishop of London 1108-1127	Robert de Belmeis	Unknown
Ralph de Langford, Dean of St Paul's, died 1150s	William de Mareni, Dean of St Paul's, died 1138	William de Belmeis I, Archdeacon of London.	Walter de Belmeis, Canon of St Paul's, Prebendary of Newington	Robert de Belmeis	Richard de Belmeis II, Archdeacon of Middlesex, Dean of St Alkmund's, Bishop of London 1152-62	Philip de Belmeis, Lord of Tong, Shropshire died c.1154	Matilda	Richard Ruffus I, Archdeacon of Essex, died 1167
William de Belmeis II, Canon of St Paul's, Prebendary of St Pancras, died c.1185	Philip de Belmeis II, died c.1159 sine prole	Ranulf de Belmeis, died c.1167 sine prole	Adelicia de Belmeis	Alan de la Zouche	Richard Ruffus II, Canon of St Paul's, died c.1201	Richard Junior, Canon of St Paul's, died 1214
Belmeis family, Shropshire landowners	Zouche family and Barons Zouche, major landowners in the Midlands

== Citations ==
Catholic Church titles
Preceded by Maurice	Bishop of London; 1108–1127	Succeeded by Gilbert Universalis
