= Beaumais =

- Commune
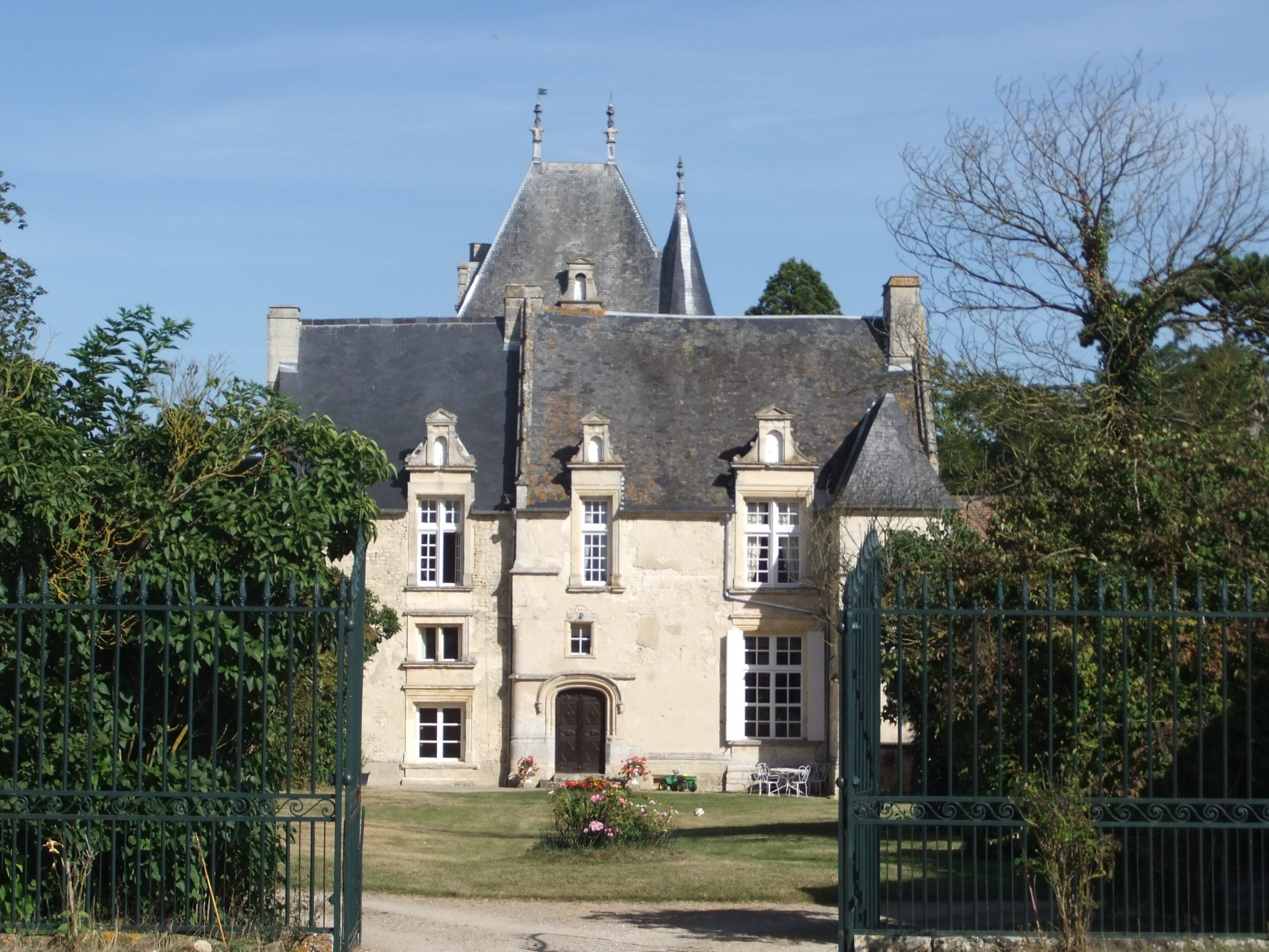
- The chateau in Beaumais
- Location of Beaumais
- Location within France Location within Normandy
- Coordinates: 48°53′45″N 0°04′26″W
- Country: France
- Region: Normandy
- Department: Calvados
- Arrondissement: Caen
- Canton: Falaise
- Intercommunality: Pays de Falaise

Government
  - Mayor (2020–2026): Françoise Lorion
- Area^{1}: 10.73 km^{2} (4.14 sq mi)
- Elevation: 60 m (200 ft)
- Highest elevation: 83 m (272 ft)
- Lowest elevation: 47 m (154 ft)
- Population (2023): 165
  - Density: 15.4/km^{2} (39.8/sq mi)
- Time zone: UTC+01:00 (CET)
  - Summer (DST): UTC+02:00 (CEST)
- INSEE/Postal code: 14053 /14620
- ^{1} French Land Register data, which excludes lakes, ponds, glaciers > 1 km^{2} (0.386 sq mi or 247 acres) and river estuaries.

Beaumais (French pronunciation: [bomɛ]) is a commune in the Calvados department in the Normandy region in northwestern France. Its Church of the Nativity dates from the 11th century, and chateau dates from the 16th century.

== Geography ==
The commune is made up of the following collection of villages and hamlets, Cantepie, La Rue, La Noé, Japigny and Beaumais.

Four rivers the Dives (river), La Filaine, Le Trainefeuille and La Gronde rivers flow through the commune, plus a stream the Monceaux.

== Population ==
Historical population
| Year | Pop. | ±% p.a. |
|---|---|---|
| 1968 | 217 | — |
| 1975 | 205 | −0.81% |
| 1982 | 169 | −2.72% |
| 1990 | 157 | −0.92% |
| 1999 | 164 | +0.49% |
| 2007 | 186 | +1.59% |
| 2012 | 173 | −1.44% |
| 2017 | 181 | +0.91% |
| 2023 | 165 | −1.53% |
Source: INSEE

== Points of Interest ==
=== National Heritage sites ===
The commune has two buildings listed as a Monument historique.

- Château à Beaumais - a sixteenth century chateau, listed as a Monument historique in 1933.
- église de la Nativité Notre Dame - A church built in 1107 by Richard de Belmeis in 1107 after the original church burnt down. The church was listed as a Monument Historique in 1930.

== See also ==
- Communes of the Calvados department
