= Robert de Sigello =

12th-century Bishop of London

- Bishop of London
- Appointed: 1141
- Term ended: 1150
- Predecessor: Anselm of St Saba
- Successor: Richard de Beaumis II

Orders
- Consecration: 1141

Personal details
- Died: probably either 28 or 29 September 1150
- Denomination: Catholic

Keeper of the Great Seal
- In office 1141–1150
- Monarch: Stephen
- Preceded by: Geoffrey Rufus
- Succeeded by: Roger le Poer

Robert de Sigello (died 1150) was a medieval Bishop of London and Lord Chancellor of England.

== Life ==
Robert was keeper of the king's seal, usually known as Lord Chancellor, from 1133 to 1135. He at one point was a monk at Reading Abbey, where he may have forged charters in favour of the abbey.

Robert was nominated to the see of London by the Empress Matilda and consecrated in 1141, possibly about July. He died in 1150, and as his death was commemorated on both 28 September and 29 September, he probably died on one of those dates in 1150.

== See also ==
- List of lord chancellors and lord keepers

== Citations ==
Political offices
Preceded by Geoffrey Rufus	Keeper of the Great Seal; 1133–1135	Succeeded by Roger le Poer
Catholic Church titles
Preceded by Anselm of St Saba	Bishop of London; 1141–1150	Succeeded by Richard de Beaumis II
