= Fulham Palace =

Historic house museum in London, England

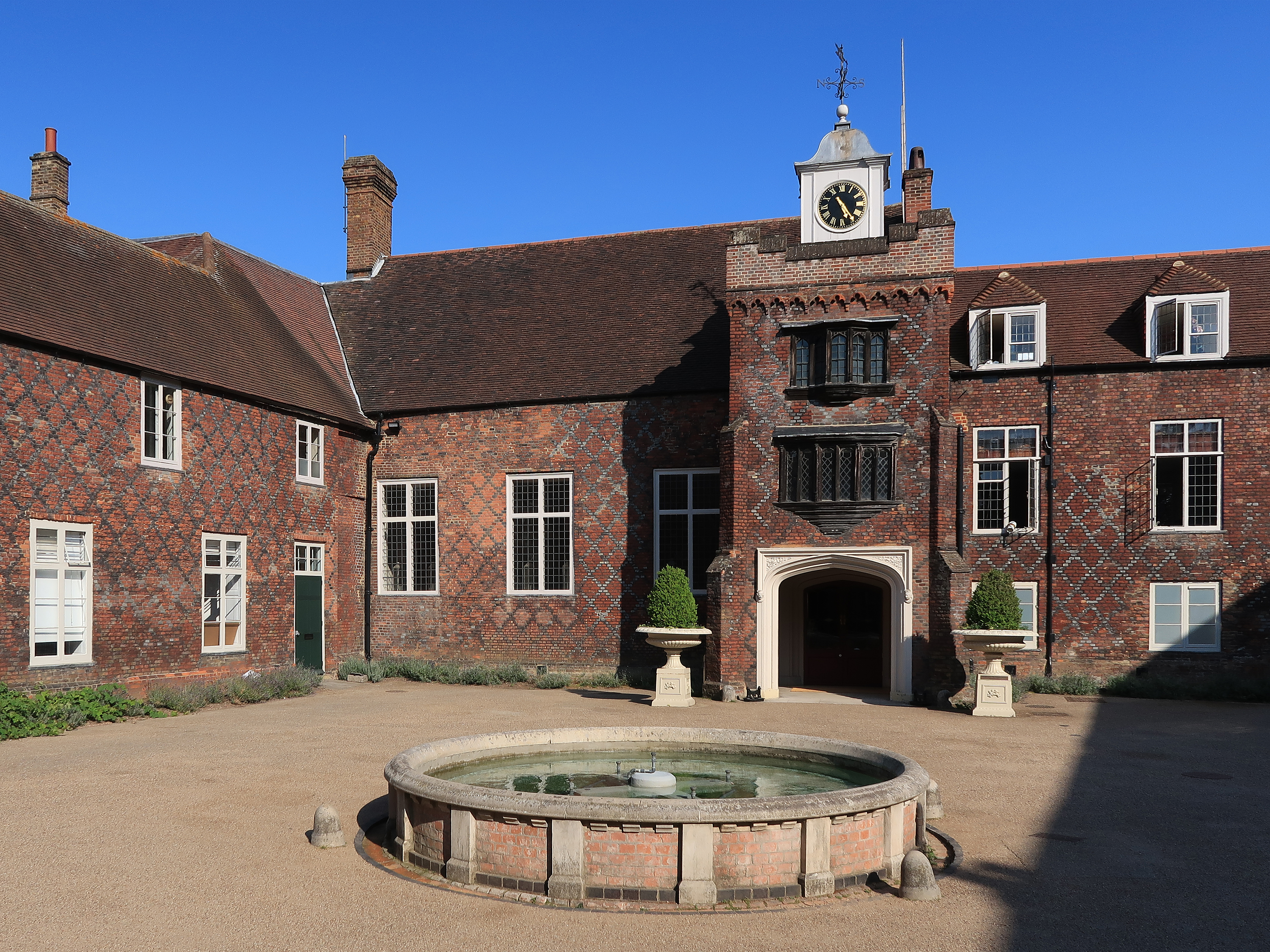
- The Tudor courtyard at Fulham Palace

- Location within London Borough of Hammersmith and Fulham

General information
- Type: Bishop's palace
- Architectural style: Tudor, Gothic, Georgian
- Location: Fulham, London, SW6, England
- Coordinates: 51°28′14″N 0°12′58″W
- Current tenants: Fulham Palace Trust
- Owner: Church of England

Technical details
- Structural system: Brick, stone, wattle and daub, timber

Website
- fulhampalace.org

Listed Building – Grade I
- Designated: 7 May 1954; Amended 11 November 1988
- Reference no.: 1286903

National Register of Historic Parks and Gardens
- Designated: 1 October 1987
- Reference no.: 1000133

Scheduled monument
- Official name: Fulham Palace moated site
- Designated: Legacy
- Reference no.: 1001964

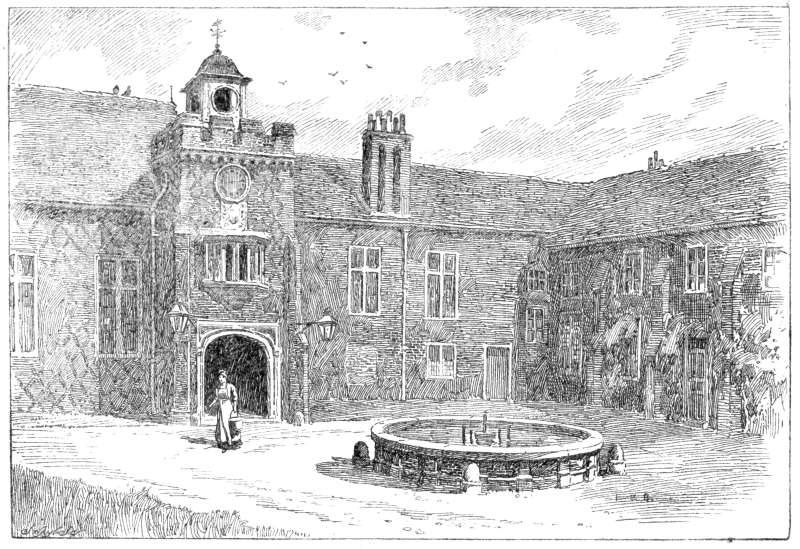
Fulham Palace in 1902

Fulham Palace is a museum and former bishop's palace. It lies on the north bank of the River Thames in Fulham, London, previously in the former English county of Middlesex. It is the site of the Manor of Fulham dating back to Saxon times and was in the continuous possession of the bishops of London as lords of the manor from the 8th to 20th centuries. The much reduced estate comprises a Grade I listed complex with medieval origins. It was the principal residence of the Bishop of London from the 11th century until 1973. The palace remains owned by the Church of England, and is managed by the Fulham Palace Trust (registered charity 1140088). It houses a number of restored historic rooms and a museum documenting its long history. The property abuts Bishops Park, once part of the estate, and contains a large botanical garden, ranked Grade II* on the Register of Historic Parks and Gardens.

The palace is open daily and is free to visit. According to figures released by the Fulham Palace Trust, over 390,000 people visited Fulham Palace in 2015/2016.

== History ==
=== Prehistoric (6000 BC–AD 43) ===
Evidence of prehistoric activity dating from the late Mesolithic and early Neolithic age has been uncovered by various archaeological investigations undertaken since the early 1970s, showing the use of struck flint. The site appears to have been an isolated eyot within the braided channel of the River Thames. Later prehistoric activity dating to the Bronze Age was revealed in the form of a possible barrow, whilst there is limited evidence for a late Iron Age occupation.

=== Roman period (AD 43–AD 410) ===
After a period of abandonment, the site was reoccupied during the late Roman period. Much of the material retrieved is domestic in origin and appears to suggest a small agricultural community was established on the banks of the Thames. It may have taken the form of a villa on this site or approximate to the neighbouring All Saints Church.

=== Saxon period (AD 410–1066) ===
There is little evidence of Saxon activity on the Fulham Palace site, although some sherds of early Saxon pottery have been recovered. The manor of Fulham was acquired by bishop Waldhere from bishop Tyrhtel in AD 704. It stretched from modern-day Chiswick in the west to Chelsea in the east; and to Harlesden in the northwest and Kensal Green in the northeast.

=== Medieval period (1066–1485) ===
The earliest evidence of medieval life at Fulham Palace is a hearth that dates to around 1080, probably belonging to the Saxo-Norman manor. The first historical reference to a Bishop of London residing at Fulham Palace relates to Bishop Robert de Sigello's captivity at the palace during The Anarchy. The medieval palace was established around what is now the palace's eastern courtyard. The first reference to the palace's chapel at this time is from 1231. Plans drawn up by Stiff Leadbetter prior to the redevelopment of the site in the late 18th century locate the chapel and its associated buildings beneath much of the 18th-century structure that still stands today. Although various fragments of stonework associated with the chapel have been uncovered, its form remains elusive: only one parliamentary survey, undertaken by William Dickes during the Civil War in 1647, describes it.

At some point between 1439 and 1440, Henry VI and his entourage visited. Following his departure, it took four days for the rooms and halls to be cleaned. Shortly after, a shingle board was taken from the Fulham Church to cover and repair the palace hall roof, and palings (fence posts) were mended between the 'house husbandry (farming area), great garden, and vyne garden.' A new bucket was also purchased for the well at the cost of 6d. The well is understood to have been built in 1426. Further buildings alluded to include a larder, a hayloft, and a stable.

=== Tudor period (1485–1603) ===
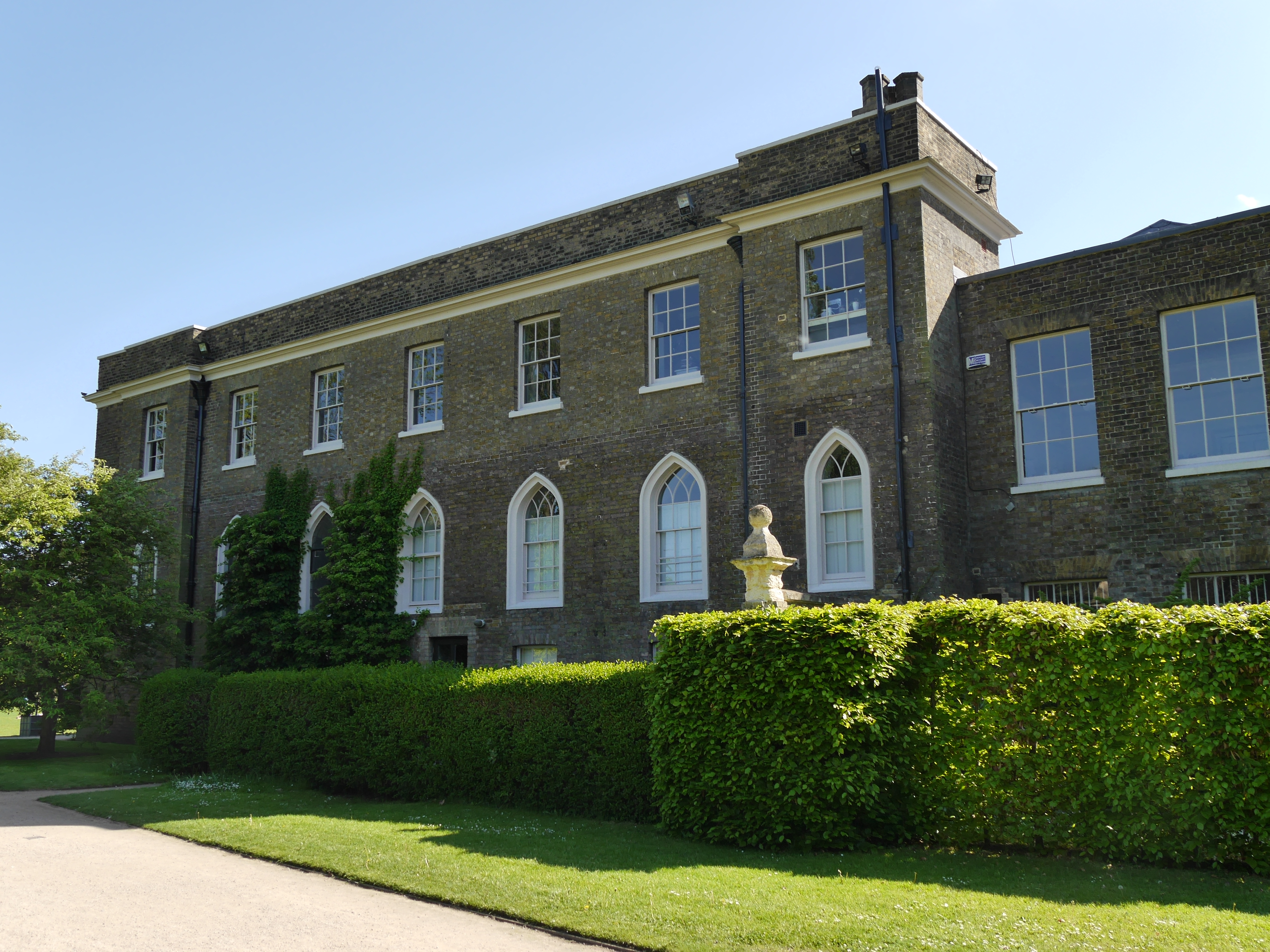
Fulham Palace, Georgian wing

Substantial alterations were made to the palace during the late 15th century, a period that witnessed the construction of the current Great Hall and the Tudor courtyard, which still stand today. It is assumed that the development would have been undertaken by Bishop Thomas Kempe c. 1480 and possibly continued by Bishop Richard FitzJames (1506–1522), principally because FitzJames's coat of arms appears on the south side of the Tudor court buildings. In addition, analysis of the timbers within the great hall roof suggests that the oak used was felled in the spring of 1493, whilst the gate to the Tudor arched entrance contains timber felled in the spring of 1495. A two-year time frame for such a considerable building project certainly seems appropriate (at least in terms of partial construction). If the timber dates are accurate, then the court and hall were both built by Bishop Richard Hill. The bishop would not have had much time to enjoy his new residence as he died in 1496.

=== Myriad architectural styles over time ===
Part of the current structure, built by Bishop Richard FitzJames, dates from the reign of Henry VII (1485–1509). The buildings underwent numerous modifications and alterations: the west courtyard is from the Tudor Period; the east courtyard is Georgian, the Great Hall is late-medieval; the eastern end of the building was renovated in Gothic style in the late 18th century; the east courtyard was classicised in the early 19th century, and the 'Tait chapel' was constructed in 1867 in Gothic Revival style.

=== World War I ===
In 1918, part of the grounds of the palace was converted into allotments for growing food to help the war effort. The palace itself formed part of Fulham military hospital. After the war, the church found it increasingly difficult to maintain such a large, expensive building. The bishop of London at the time, Arthur Winnington-Ingram, offered to give up the palace and live in two rooms as he had while the palace was being used "for the purpose of the National Mission" (the war effort), but was unwilling to let the palace pass into secular hands.

=== World War II ===
Parts of the palace were damaged by bombing and, after the war, the church found it increasingly difficult to maintain the large, expensive historic building. In 1954, the Church Commissioners' architect described the palace as "badly planned and inconvenient".

In 1952 the architectural firm of Seely & Paget restored the chapel

After many years of indecision the church authorities vacated the palace in 1973.

== Fulham Palace today ==
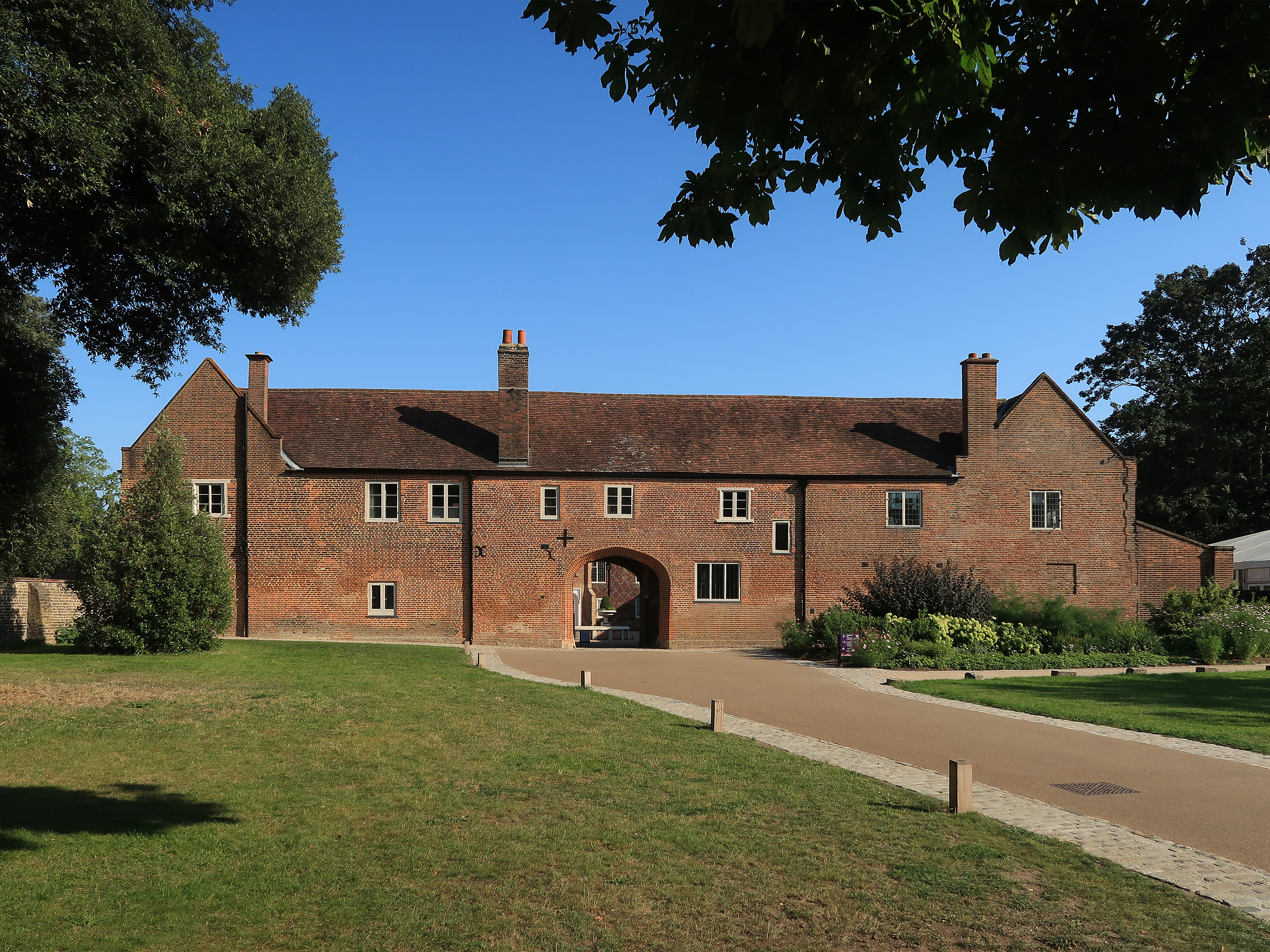
View of Fulham Palace

After the bishop of London left the palace in 1973, the property was leased in 1975 for 100 years by Hammersmith Council for the purpose of opening a museum and art gallery. After this, the palace and gardens suffered a period of neglect. In 1990, a trust was established to oversee the property in collaboration with the council.

The grounds of the palace originally covered more than 30 acres (12 ha), though today only 13 acres (5.3 ha) remain. Although the palace has its own chapel, the garden adjoins the churchyard of the neighbouring parish church, All Saints Church, Fulham, where several former bishops are buried. The allotments planted during the war still survive; many are still in use, allowing local people to grow their own vegetables, fruit and flowers.

Some of the ancient trees in and around Fulham Palace remain to this day, and visitors can still see the knot garden and wisteria which survive in the palace's walled gardens. A large holm oak, believed to be 500 years old, has been designated as one of the Great Trees of London.

=== Restoration of the palace and grounds ===
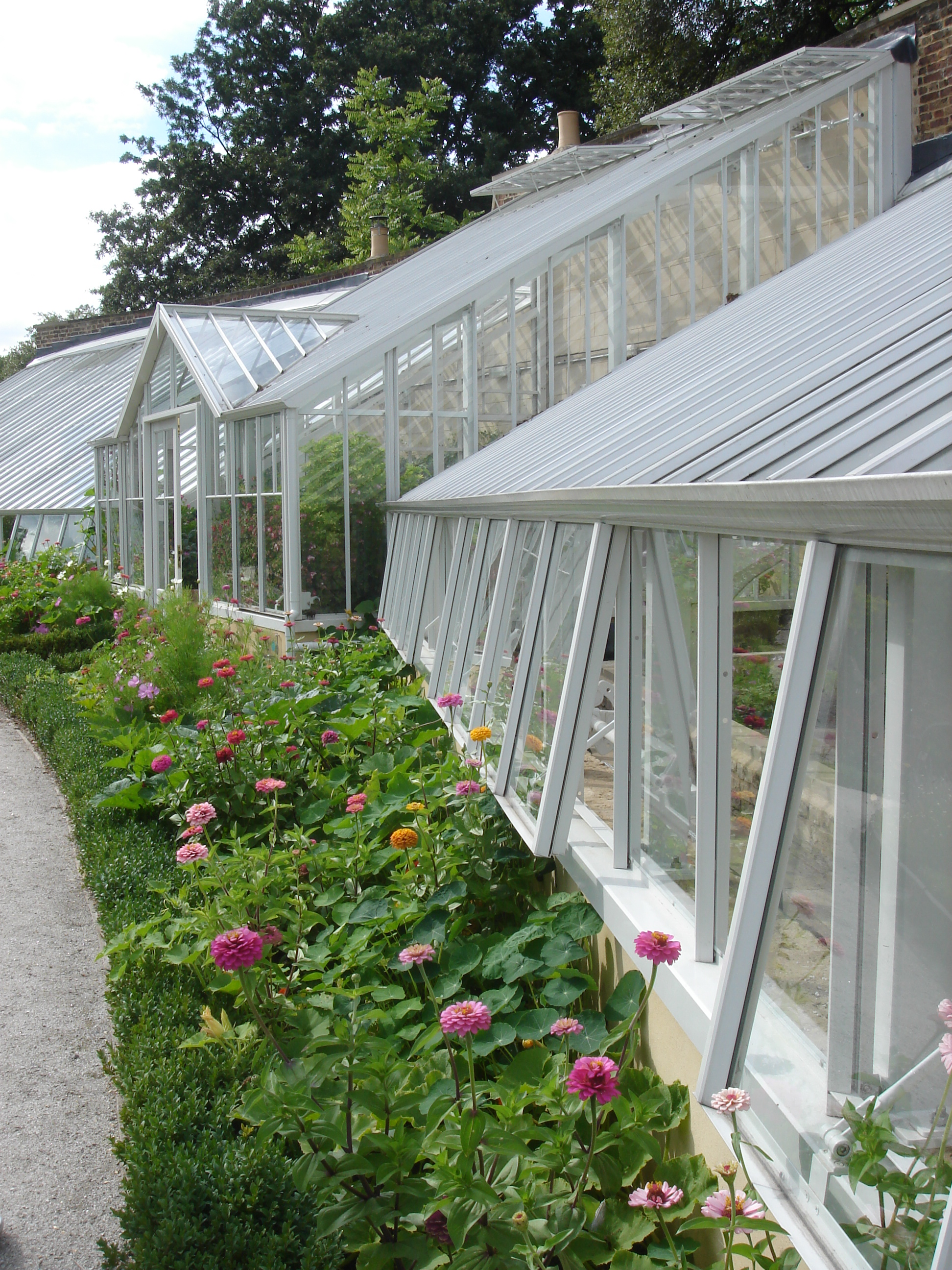
Glasshouses

The Fulham Palace Restoration Project began in the 2000s and was carried out in three phases. The first phase, completed in 2006, restored the east wing of the palace and part of the west wing including the Tudor courtyard at a cost of £4 million. The second phase focussed on the walled garden, the outbuildings, and the moat, and was completed in 2011, costing £7 million. The third phase was completed in 2019 and includes a new museum as well as significant restoration work to the brickwork in the Tudor courtyard and the Tudor Great Hall. Funding for all three phases came from the National Lottery Heritage Fund and Fulham Palace Trust.

Fulham Palace is a Grade I-listed building standing within a scheduled ancient monument. A number of structures on the property are Grade II-listed buildings including the chapel, moat bridge and attached piers, stables, walls of the walled garden, vinery, and bothies.

== The palace moat ==
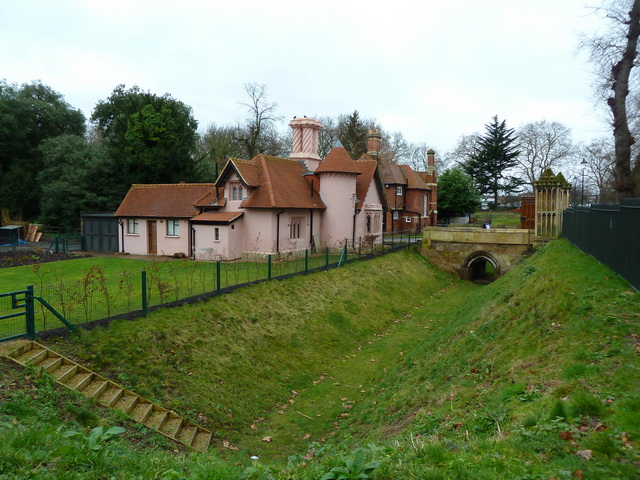
Gatehouses and reinstated moat, Fulham Palace

The palace's moat, which is a scheduled monument, is nearly 1.4 km (0.9 mi) in length. It was the largest domestic moated site in medieval England, but its origin is unknown. The first known reference to the moat was in a 1392 document that refers to magna fossa ('great ditch'), but it is thought to be much older. Its distance from the palace suggests that it might have had a function other than defence. An alternative idea is that it was built by the Danes as a safeguard against flooding by the Thames.

The moat was filled in with debris in the 1920s, at the request of the bishop of the time, Arthur Winnington-Ingram. Despite this, the entire moat still exists, underground, as an unbroken circuit. In 2010, an excavation of the moat began as part of a £8 million renovation of the palace and adjoining Bishops Park.

== The palace garden ==
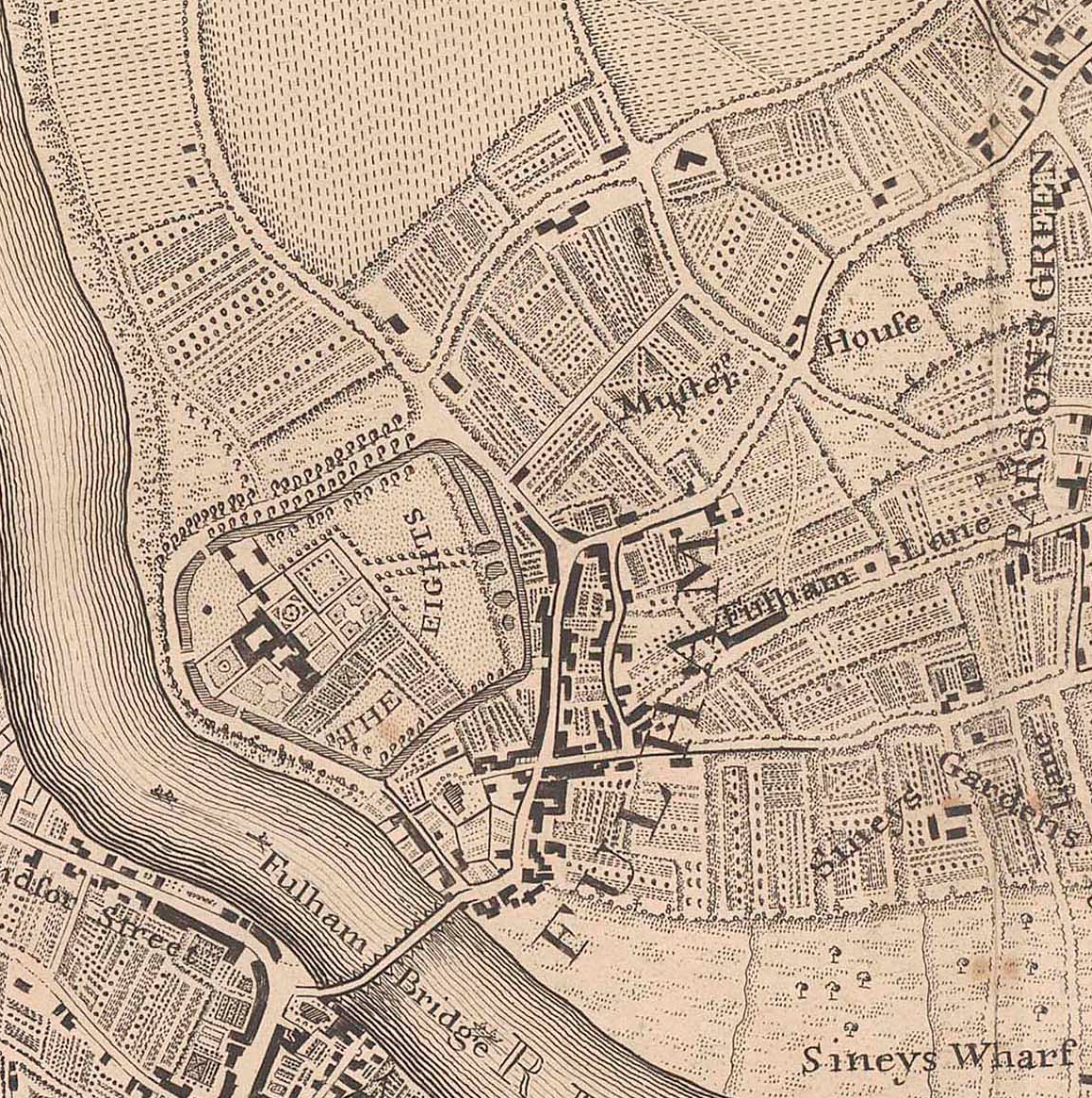
Map by John Rocque published in 1746

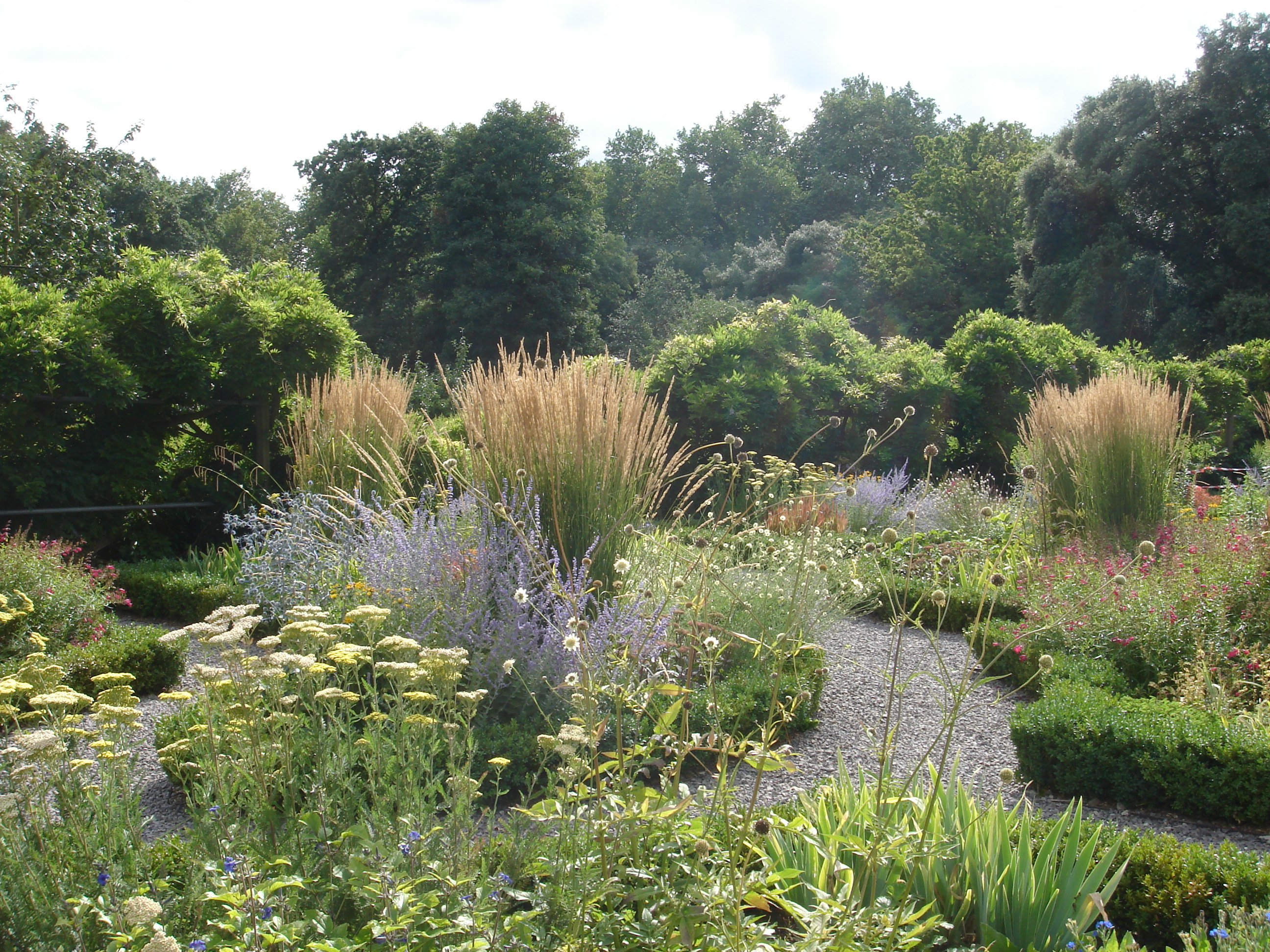
Walled garden

The garden at Fulham Palace has been one of the most important botanical gardens since the 16th century and is the second oldest in London. Bishop Edmund Grindal (c. 1519 – 1583) built a Tudor walled garden and a series of parterre gardens. He is credited with the introduction of the tamarisk tree to England and grew grapes that were sent to Elizabeth I.

In the early part of the 17th century, the gardens at Fulham Palace appear to have suffered from some unsympathetic attention. The antiquary John Aubrey records among his memoranda, "the Bishop of London did cutte-down a noble Clowd of trees at Fulham", occasioning the sharp remark from Sir Francis Bacon, a dedicated gardener, "that he was a good Expounder of dark places." This changed with Bishop Henry Compton (1675–1713) who introduced many new plant species to England in the gardens at Fulham Palace, including the American magnolia, M. virginiana, Liriodendron, Liquidambar and the first American azalea grown in England, Rhododendron viscosum. In his heated "stoves" he grew the first coffee tree in England. The red horse chestnut, a hybrid of Aesculus hippocastanum and the American Aesculus pavia, was still noted in Fulham Palace gardens as late as 1751.

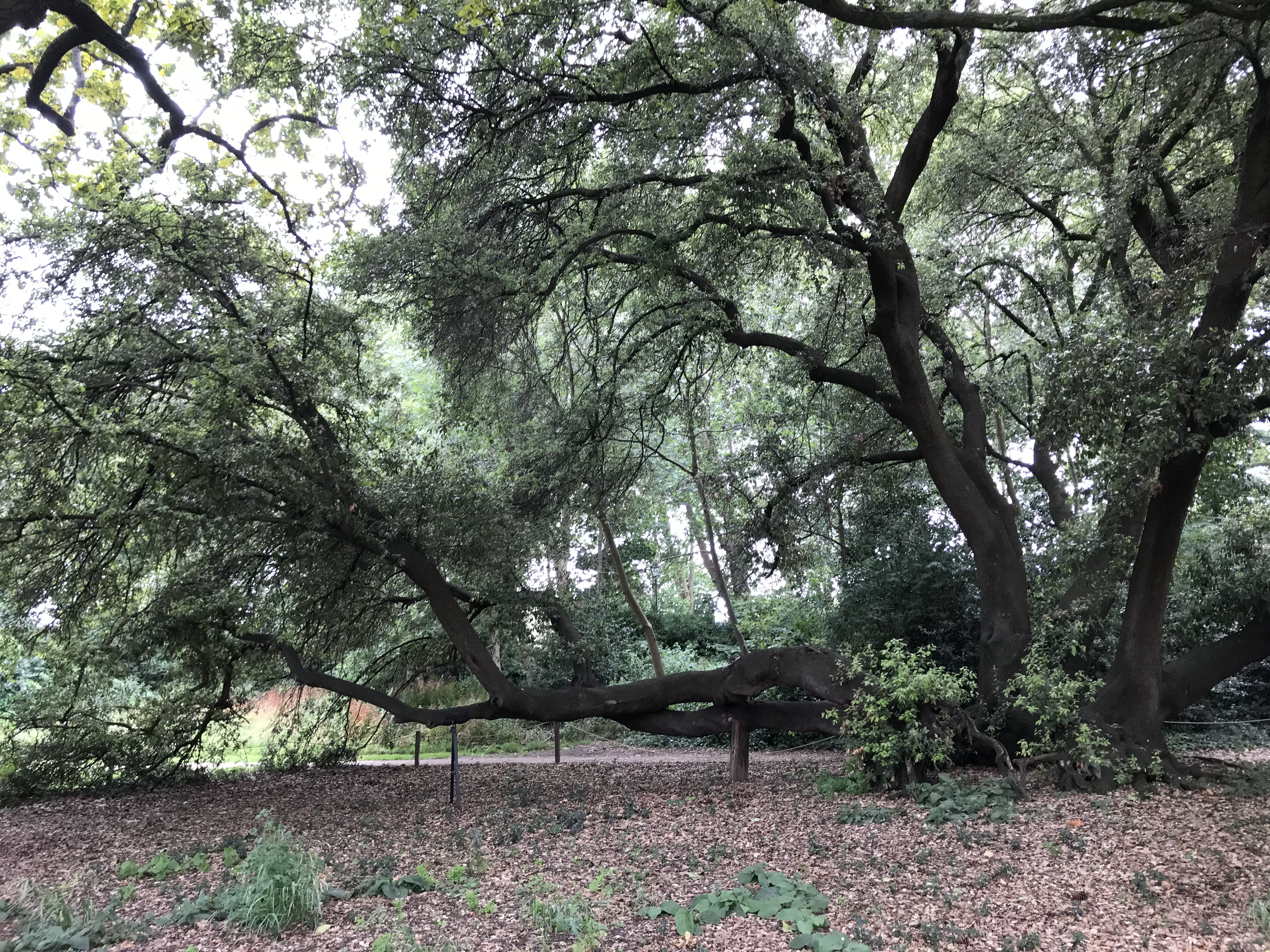
Fulham Palace ancient Oak

By 1681, the gardens at Fulham Palace were already remarkable, as John Evelyn noted when he visited them. Bishop Compton's gardener in the early years was George London, who started a famous nursery at Brompton in the year of Evelyn's visit. By 1686, William Penn's gardener was hoping to exchange the exotic flora of Pennsylvania for seedlings and slips of trees and shrubs and seeds from Fulham Palace gardens. Compton's staunch defence of his former pupils, the princesses Mary and Anne, led to his appointment as Deputy Superintendent of the Royal Gardens to William III and Mary II, and as Commissioner for Trade and Plantations. In the colonies, Compton had a botanical correspondent in John Banister, who was sent first to the West Indies and then to Virginia, and who, before his untimely death, sent Bishop Compton drawings, seeds, and herbarium specimens from which the bishop's close friend John Ray compiled the first published account of North American flora in his Historia Plantarum (1688).

== The Tait chapel ==
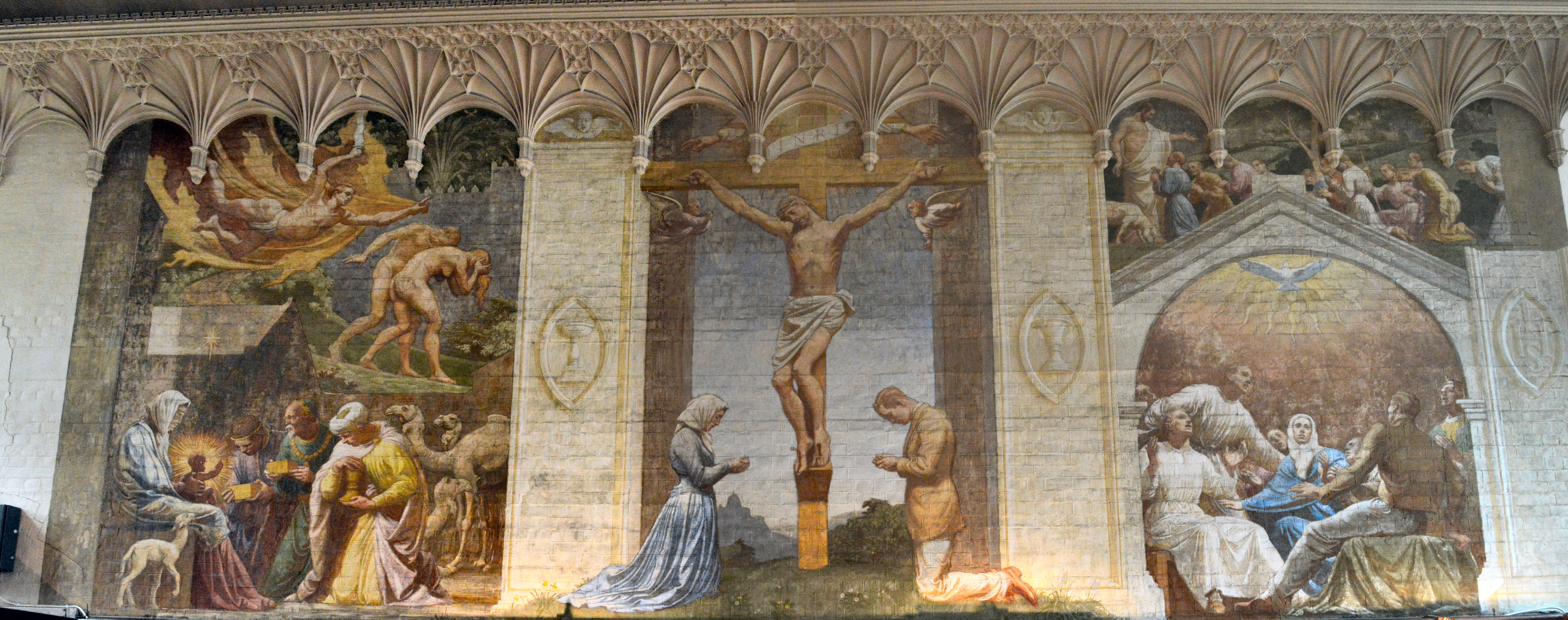
Wall painting in the Tait chapel

The Tait chapel at Fulham Palace, the fourth on the site, was designed by William Butterfield for Bishop Archibald Campbell Tait in 1866–7. It is dedicated to the Blessed Trinity and it cost £1869. Damaged by a bomb in World War II, the chapel was reorganised in the 1950s for Bishop William Wand. The Salviati mosaic reredos was moved to the west end. The east window, destroyed in the war, was replaced by a new window by Ninian Comper in 1956. It shows "The Risen Saviour" with the message "Feed my sheep"; bishops Mandell Creighton and Wand stand on either side. The top window commemorates Wand's son who died in a mountaineering accident in 1934. The west window by Clayton and Bell survived. Butterfield's patterned brickwork was painted over by Brian Thomas and students from Byam Shaw School of Art in 1953. The north wall painting shows: "The Fall" with Adam; the nativity is below; Atonement with the crucifixion, and the Last Supper with the gift of the Holy Spirit. The south wall: St Peter and a vision of unclean beasts, the stoning of St Stephen, the risen Christ with two hands of God the Father, Conversion of St Paul.

== Museum and art gallery ==
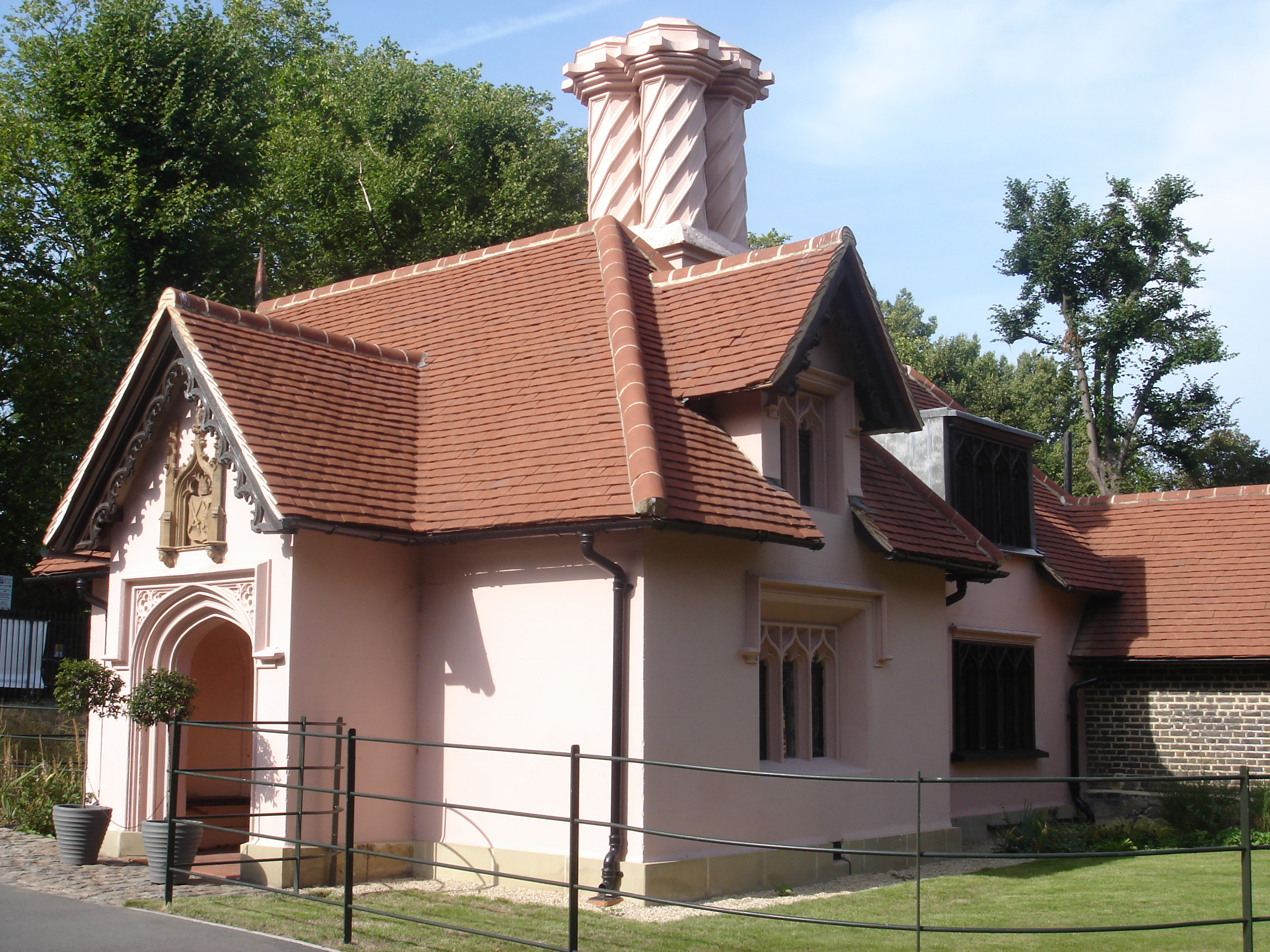
Gothic lodge

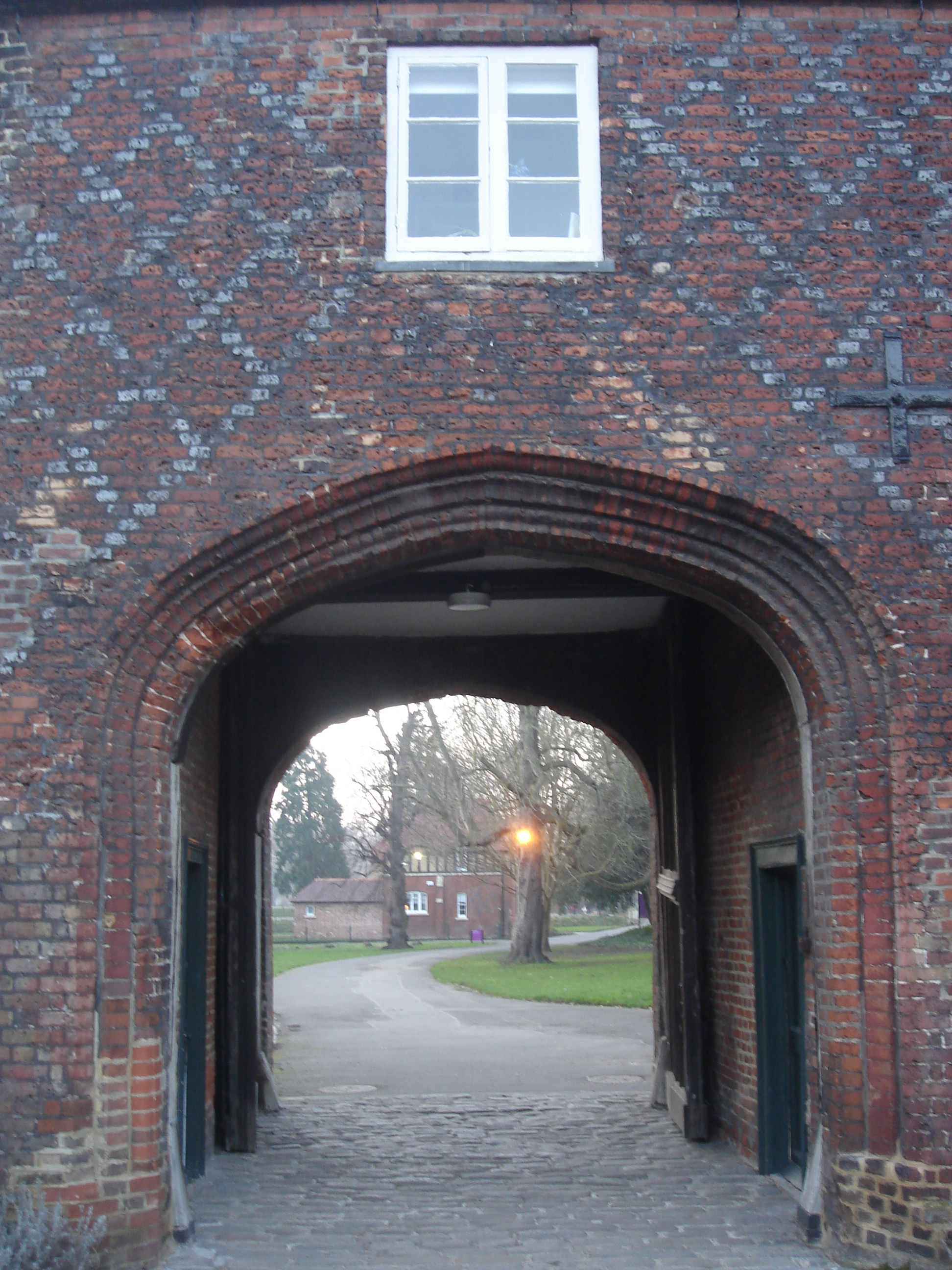
Looking out from Tudor courtyard

In 1992, the Museum of Fulham Palace was set up in Bishop William Howley's dining room and Bishop Porteus's library (named after Bishop Beilby Porteus, 1731–1809), in the early 19th century part of the palace. It contained some of the paintings that once hung in the building, stained glass, carved fragments of masonry and a bishop's cope, as well as displays describing the palace's history.

The lost manuscript of William Bradford's Of Plymouth Plantation (1620–47), an important founding document of the United States, was discovered in the library in 1855, and first published the next year. No one knows how it made its way there from America, but in 1897 it was given to Thomas F. Bayard, U.S. Ambassador to the United Kingdom, and repatriated to New England.

The palace's art collection includes a number of notable portraits: two 1798 works by Benjamin West, St Margaret of Scotland and Thomas a Becket; an oil on canvas of Field Marshal George Wade by Adriaen van Diest; an oil on canvas of Beilby Porteus by John Hoppner; and a Reginald Henry Lewis oil on canvas of William Wand.

== Visitor access ==
The house and garden are open daily with free admission, with access to the museum and historic rooms. The restored walled garden is also open daily. The botanic garden is open daily from dawn to dusk. A café, in what was once Bishop Howley's dining room, serves lunches and light refreshments.

== See also ==
- All Saints Church, Fulham
- History of London

== Bibliography ==
- Coats, Alice M. (Autumn 1976). "The Hon. and Rev. Henry Compton, Lord Bishop of London". Garden History. 4 (3): 14–20. doi:10.2307/1586520. JSTOR 1586520.
- Dick, Oliver Lawson, ed. (1949). "Francis Bacon, Viscount of St. Albans". Aubrey's Brief Lives.
- MacArthur, Rosie, ed. (2013). Oil Paintings in Public Ownership in London, West. Photographs by Andy Johnson & Justin Piperger. Public Catalogue Foundation. ISBN 978-1-909475-15-1.
