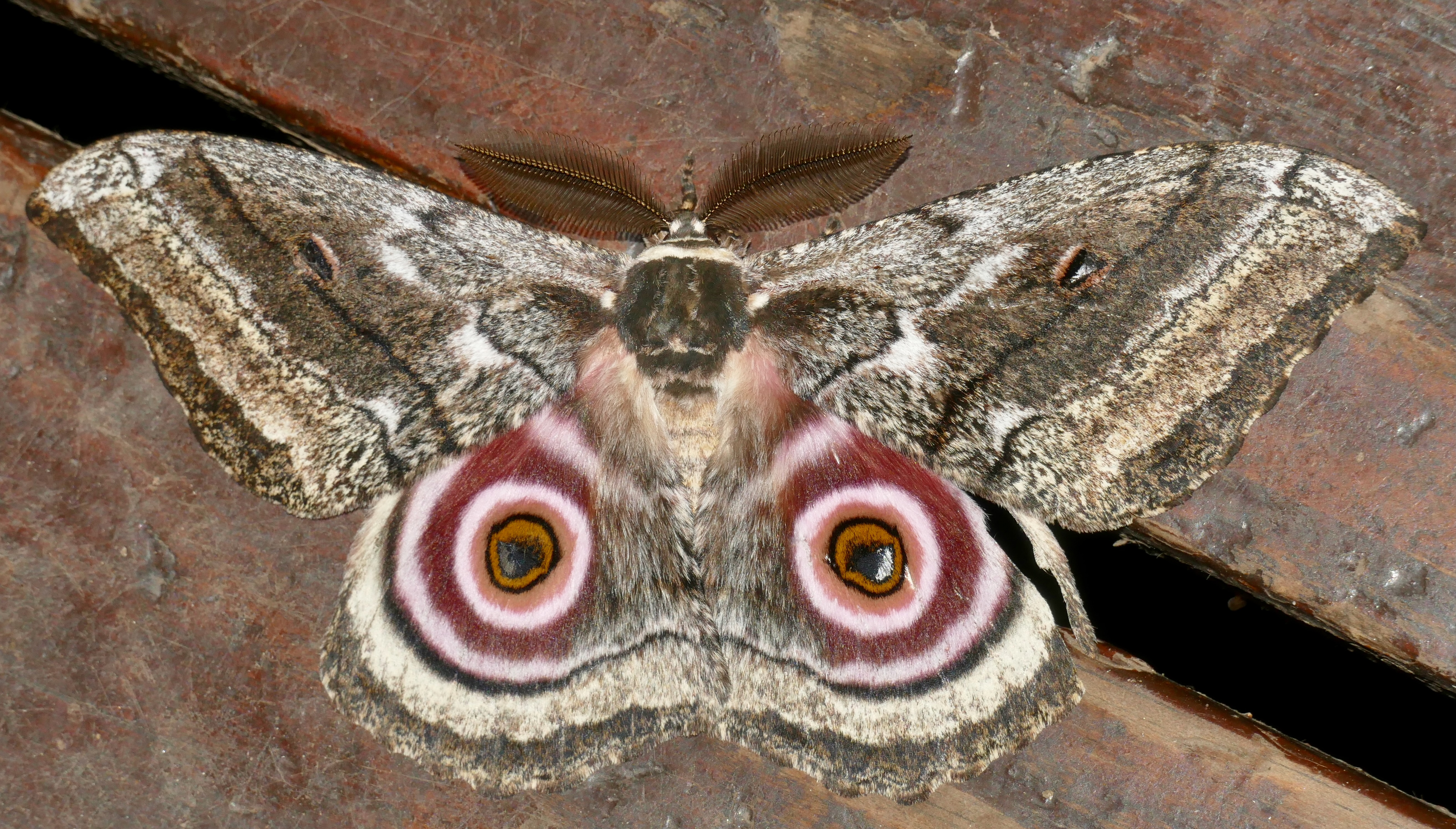

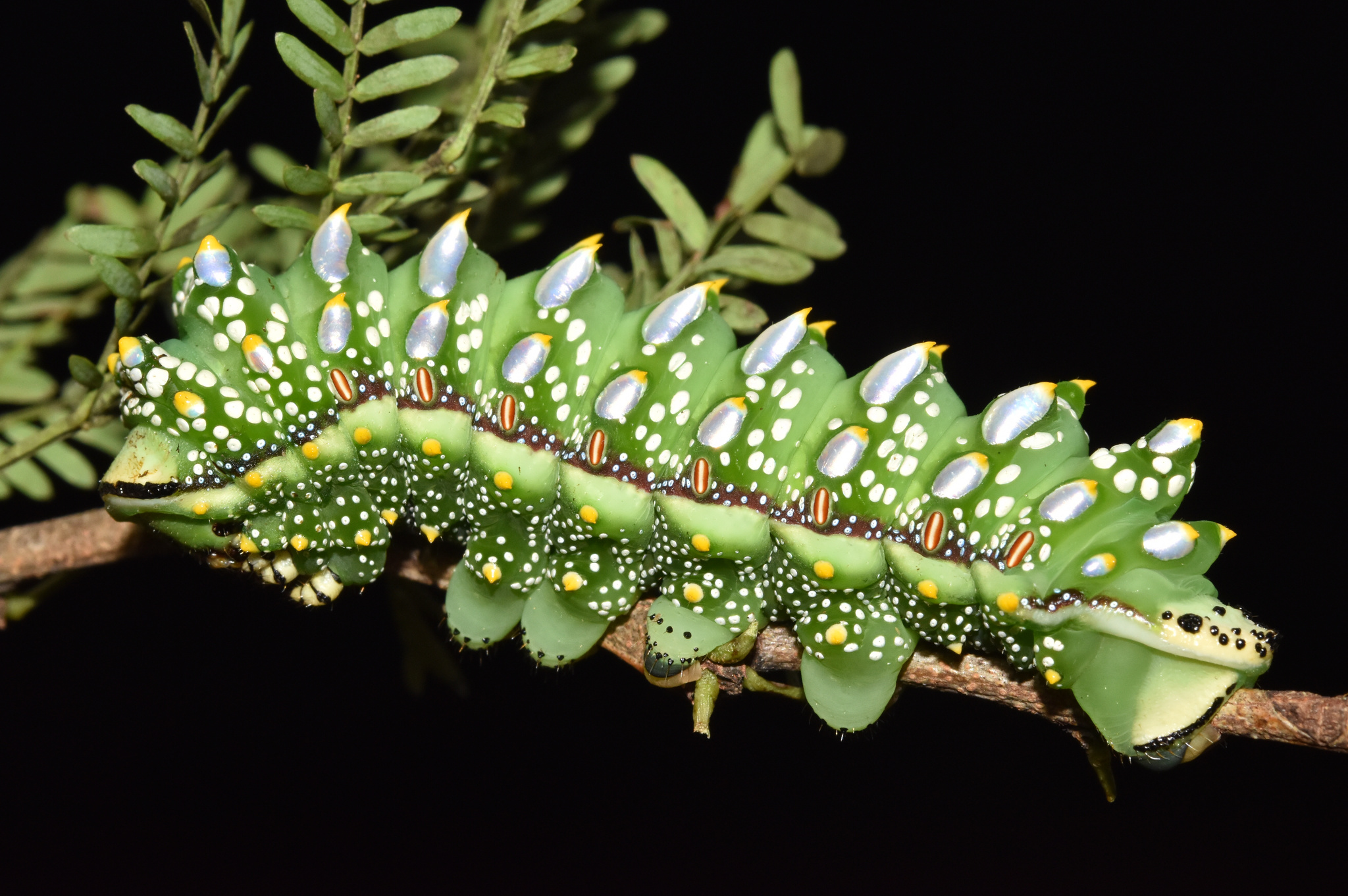
- Adult male and caterpillar

Scientific classification
- Kingdom: Animalia
- Phylum: Arthropoda
- Class: Insecta
- Order: Lepidoptera
- Family: Saturniidae
- Genus: Gynanisa
- Species: G. maja

Binomial name
- Gynanisa maja (Klug, 1836)

Synonyms
- Saturnia maja Klug, 1836; Saturnia isis Duncan [& Westwood], 1841; Anacalaespina tata Wallengren, 1858; Gynanisa nigra

= Gynanisa maja =

Species of moth

Gynanisa maja, the speckled emperor (Bemba: chipumi; Kibembe: kawanatengo) is a moth of the family Saturniidae. The species was first described by Johann Christoph Friedrich Klug in 1836. It is known from South Africa to eastern Africa (up to Angola and Zambia). Gynanisa nigra is just a darker form and not a distinct species.

The wingspan is 105–113 mm. Adults are on wing from late December to early February.

Larvae have been recorded on Acacia erioloba, Acacia karroo, Acacia mollissima, Berlinia paniculata, Brachystegia venosa, Cassia, Colophospermum mopane, Elephantorrhiza burchelli, Julbernardia, Laburnum, Peltophorum, Prunus persica, Pterocarpus, Quercus gambelii, Quercus robur, Quercus turneri, Robinia pseudoacacia and Schotia. Early instar larvae are gregarious.

The larvae serve as an important human food source. See Entomophagy.
