= Reginald Lewis (disambiguation) =

Reginald Lewis (1942–1993) was an American businessman.

Reginald, Reg or Reggie Lewis may also refer to:

- Reggie Lewis (1965–1993), American basketball player
- Reggie Lewis (cornerback) (born 1984), American football cornerback
- Reggie Lewis (defensive lineman) (1954–2008), American football defensive lineman
- Reggie P. Lewis, American football defensive lineman
- Reg Lewis (footballer) (1920–1997), English footballer
- Reg Lewis (bodybuilder) (1936–2021), American bodybuilder and actor
- Reginald Henry Lewis (1894–1973), English painter
- Reginald Lewis (cricketer), South African cricketer
