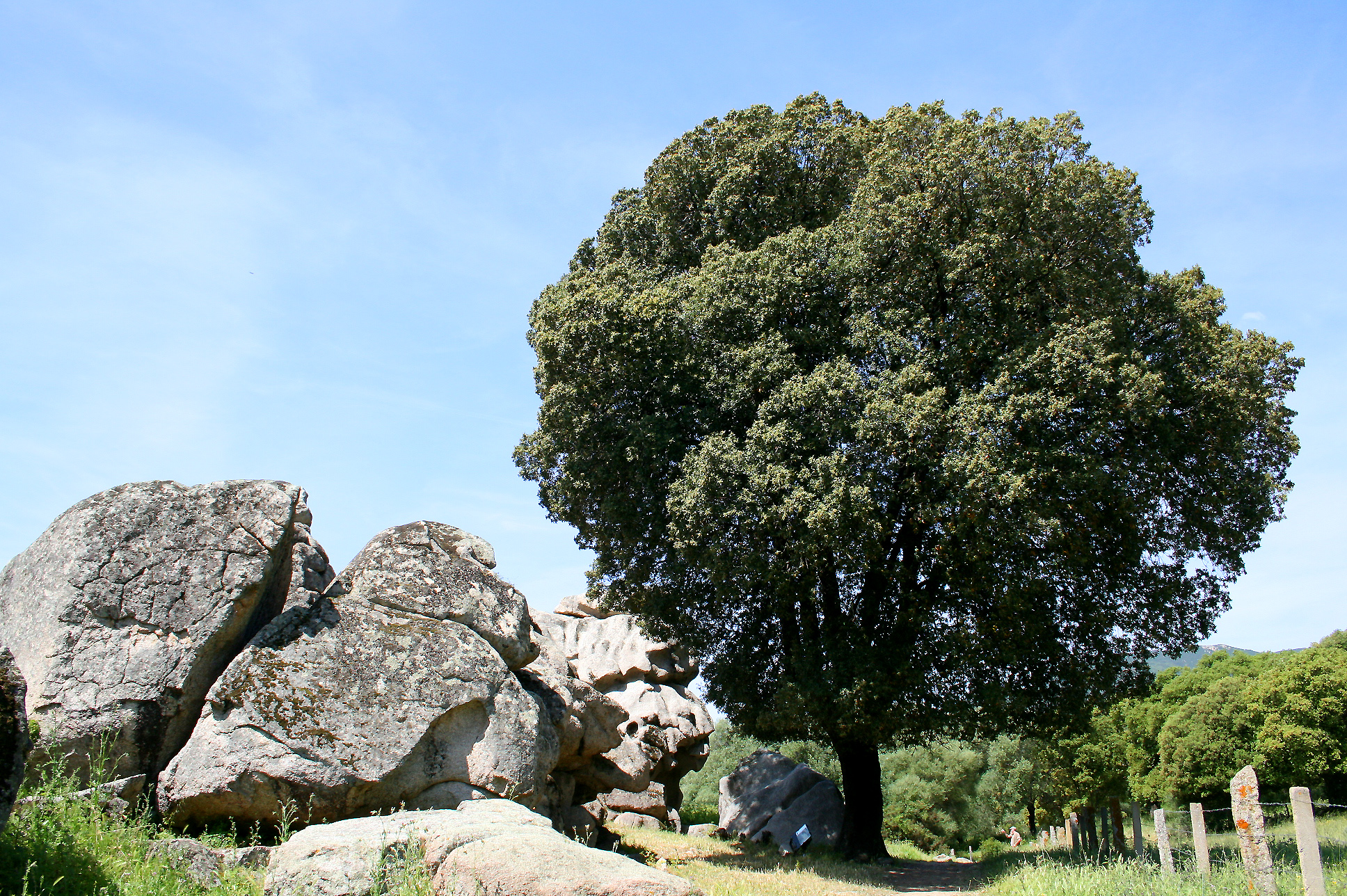

Conservation status
- Least Concern (IUCN 3.1)

Scientific classification
- Kingdom: Plantae
- Clade: Tracheophytes
- Clade: Angiosperms
- Clade: Eudicots
- Clade: Rosids
- Order: Fagales
- Family: Fagaceae
- Genus: Quercus
- Subgenus: Quercus subg. Cerris
- Section: Quercus sect. Ilex
- Species: Q. ilex

Binomial name
- Quercus ilex L.
- Species' distribution: Q. ilex (green), Q. rotundifolia (rose)

= Quercus ilex =

Oak tree species native to the Mediterranean

The holm oak (Quercus ilex), also called the holly oak, is a large evergreen oak native to the Mediterranean region. It is a member of the section Ilex of the genus, with acorns that mature in a single summer.

== Description ==
It is a large evergreen tree, attaining in favourable places a height of 21–28 metres (69–92 feet), and developing in open situations a huge head of densely leafy branches as much across, the terminal portions of the branches often pendulous in old trees. The tallest recorded, a tree planted at Windsor Great Park, is 30.4 m tall. The trunk is sometimes over 6 m (20 ft) in girth. The young shoots are clothed with a close grey felt. The leaves are very variable in shape, most frequently narrowly oval or ovate-lanceolate, 4–8 centimetres (1 1/2–3 inches) long (rarely to 10 cm long), 2–5 cm wide (rarely to 8 cm wide), rounded or broadly tapered at the base, pointed, the margins usually entire on mature trees, or (especially on young trees) more or less spiny-toothed. When quite young, both surfaces are clothed with whitish down, which soon falls away entirely from the upper surface, leaving it a dark glossy green; on the lower surface it turns grey or tawny, and persists until the fall of the leaf; the petiole is 3–16 millimetres (1/8–5/8 in) long. The acorns are produced one to three together on a short downy stalk, ripening the first season; they are usually 12–20 mm long in the UK, the cups with adpressed, downy scales, and an often wavy margin.

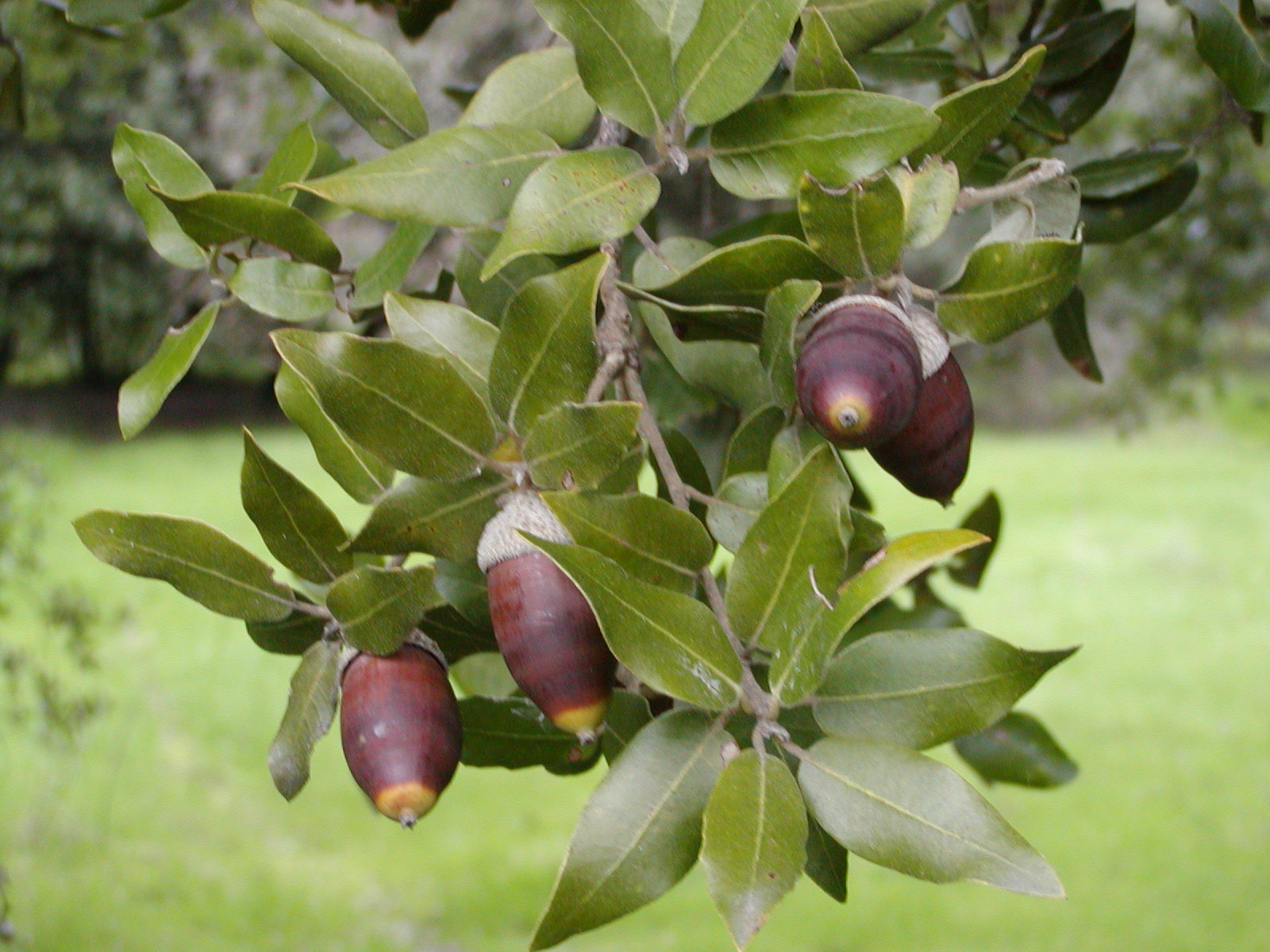
Mature acorns on a tree in Corsica

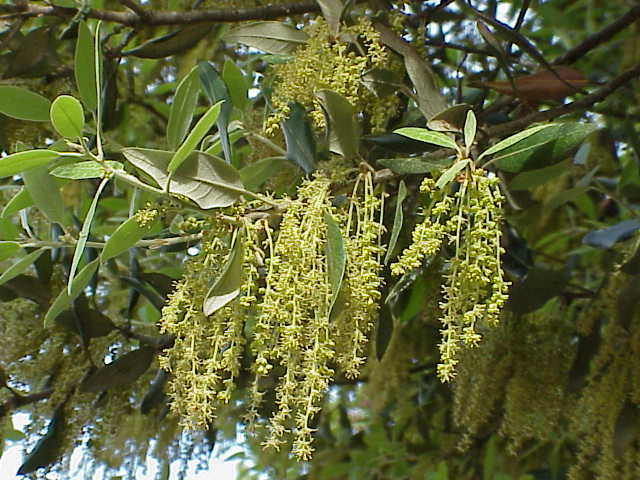
Leaves and catkins in spring

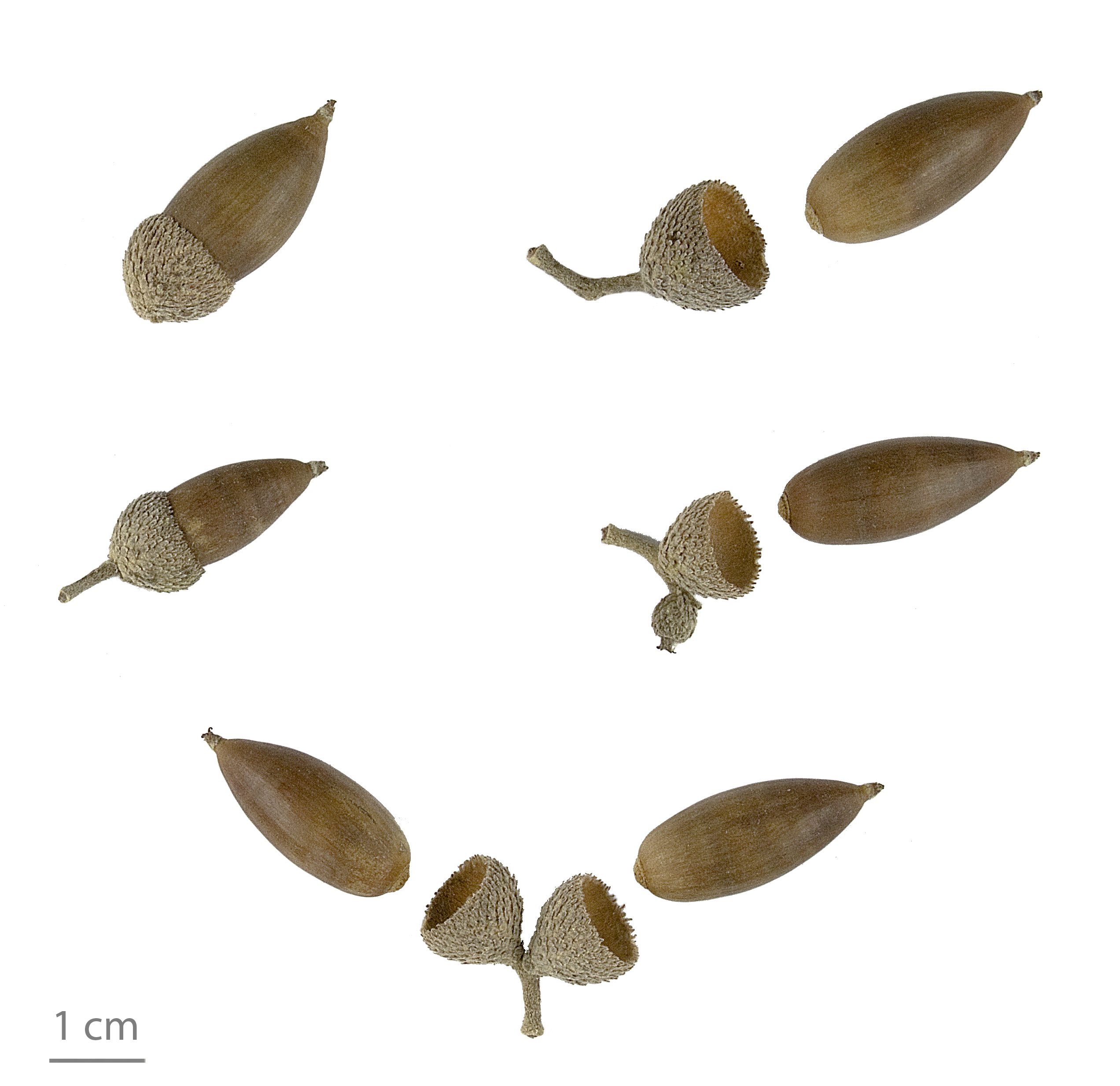
Quercus ilex, MHNT

== Distribution and habitat ==
Holm oak grows in pure stands or mixed forest in the Mediterranean and often at low or moderate elevations, but also at higher altitudes in the Atlas Mountains. It is native from westernmost Turkey and through Greece west to parts of the Iberian Peninsula, where it mixes with Q. rotundifolia, along the northern Mediterranean coastal belt, and in the Atlas Mountains in Tunisia and Algeria.

== Taxonomy ==
Quercus ilex is placed in section Ilex.

The closely related species Quercus rotundifolia was previously thought to be a subspecies of Q. ilex, but is now more often treated as a separate species. Some authors still describe Quercus rotundifolia as a subspecies of Quercus ilex.

== Etymology ==
The resemblance of the foliage to that of the common European holly, Ilex aquifolium, has led to its common and botanic names. The species name ilex was originally the classical Latin name for the holm oak, but later adopted as a botanical genus name for the hollies. The common name 'holm oak' takes its name from holm, an ancient name for holly.

== Cultivation and uses ==
The wood is hard and tough, and has been used since ancient times for general construction purposes as pillars, tools, wagons (as mentioned in Hesiod, Works and Days on page 429), vessels and wine casks. It is also used as firewood and in charcoal manufacture.

The holm oak is one of the top three trees used in the establishment of truffle orchards, or truffières. Truffles grow in an ectomycorrhizal association with the tree's roots. In Portugal and Spain, the tree's pointed acorns are fed to porcines raised for the purpose of producing 'iberico ham.' The tree also produces yellow catkins which are a good source of pollen for insects such as bees at the beginning of spring. The trees also provide strong branches and a generous canopy for nesting birds.

Although it takes a long time to grow, it enjoys a long life, thrives in dry climates, mixes well with other kinds of vegetation, and can grow in varying types of soil and elevation. It is therefore a boon to stable ecosystems, making it a crucial species in Mediterranean woodlands, providing shade, homes, and nourishment for wildlife.

The first trees to be grown from acorns in England are still to be found within the stately grounds of Mamhead Park, Devon. From Britton & Brayley in The Beauties of England and Wales (1803):

The woods and plantations of Mamhead are numerous and extensive. Many of them were introduced by Mr Thomas Balle (sic), the last of that family who, on returning from the continent, brought with him a quantity of cork, ilex, wainscot, oak; Spanish chestnut, acacia, and other species of exotic trees.

Holm oak is not officially listed as an invasive species in the United Kingdom but is naturalised, able to naturally regenerate. Normally the tree is unable to withstand severe frost, which would prevent it from spreading north, but with climate change, it has successfully penetrated and established itself in areas north of its native range. The largest population of holm oak in Northern Europe is present on and around St. Boniface Down on the Isle of Wight and into the neighbouring town of Ventnor, a town known for its naturally warmer microclimate, and has shown to tolerate the high winds on the downs. It is thought that this population's propagation (which was established in the late 1800s after having been planted by Victorian residents) has been bolstered by native Eurasian jays (Garrulus glandarius), which harvest acorns from oak trees and store them by burying them in the ground where they may then germinate. Feral goats were brought to Ventnor to control the spread of the holm oak.

It can be clipped to form a tall hedge, and it is suitable for coastal windbreaks, in any well drained soil. It forms a picturesque rounded head, with pendulous low-hanging branches. Its size and solid evergreen character gives it an imposing architectural presence that makes it valuable in many urban and garden settings. While holm oak can be grown in much of maritime northwestern Europe, it is not tolerant of cold continental winters. It is a parent of Quercus × turneri, along with Quercus robur.

Holm oak was introduced to California in 1858 and is now a widely planted and locally naturalised species; it is often called "holly oak" there.

== Notable trees ==
The Tree Register Champion in Gloucestershire measured 8.95 m in circumference and 12 m in height in 1993. Another tree at Courtown House, Wexford, Ireland, reputedly planted in 1648, measured 20 m in height, with a spread of 43 m in 2010. An ancient tree reputed to be 500 years old at Fulham Palace, London is listed as one of the Great Trees of London.

The oldest holm oak in Spain, the Encina Tres Patas de Mendaza, located in Navarre, is reputed to be 1,200 years old. A specimen in Milo, in Sicily, is reputed to be 700 years old while a small population on the slopes of northern village of Wardija in Malta are said to be between 500 and 1,000 years old. Prior to the Carthaginian period, holm oak was prevalent on the islands.

Several holm oaks sit atop the 45 metre (148 ft) tall, 14th century Guinigi Tower in Lucca, Italy, making it a notable tourist attraction for the city.

The Roman poet Horace predicted that the ilex growing on his farm would become famous when he included it in his hymn to the Spring of Bandusia there (Odes 3.13.12–16):

fies nobilium tu quoque fontium,
me dicente cavis impositam ilicem
saxis, unde loquaces
lymphae desiliunt tuae.

(You will become one of the famous springs, too,
Now that I am telling of the ilex planted over your stone
Hollows, where your babbling
Waters leap down.)
