= Robert FitzHugh =

15th-century Bishop of London

- Bishop of London
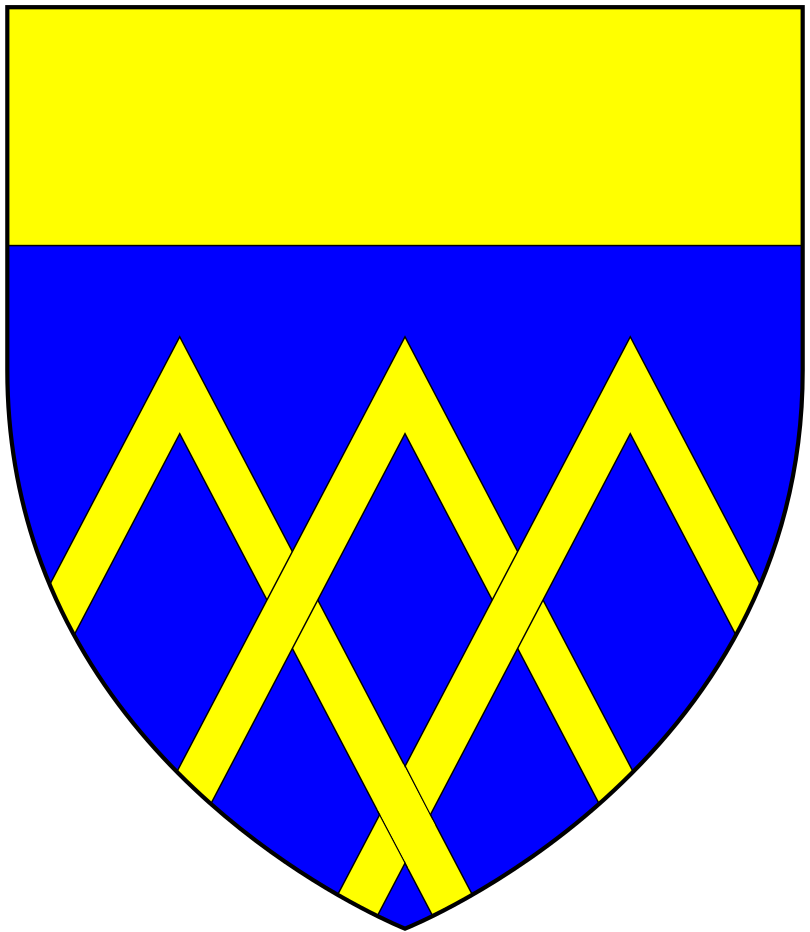
- Arms of FitzHugh: Azure, three chevrons interlaced in base or a chief of the last
- Appointed: 30 April 1431
- Term ended: 15 January 1436
- Predecessor: William Grey
- Successor: Robert Gilbert

Orders
- Consecration: 16 September 1431

Personal details
- Died: 15 January 1436
- Denomination: Catholic

Robert FitzHugh (died 1436) was Bishop of London and Chancellor of the University of Cambridge.

== Origins ==
FitzHugh was the second son of Henry FitzHugh, 3rd Baron FitzHugh (c. 1363-1425), KG, of Ravensworth Castle in North Yorkshire, by his wife Elizabeth Grey (born c. 1363), a daughter of Sir Robert de Grey, a son of John de Grey, 1st Baron Grey de Rotherfield.

== Career ==
FitzHugh was provided to the see of London on 30 April 1431 and was consecrated on 16 September 1431.

== Death ==
FitzHugh died on 15 January 1436.

== Memorial ==
There was a memorial brass to him in the quire at Old St Paul's Cathedral.

== Citations ==
Academic offices
Preceded by Thomas Cobham	Chancellor of the University of Cambridge; 1424–1426	Succeeded by William Wymbell
Catholic Church titles
Preceded by William Grey	Bishop of London; 1431–1436	Succeeded by Robert Gilbert
