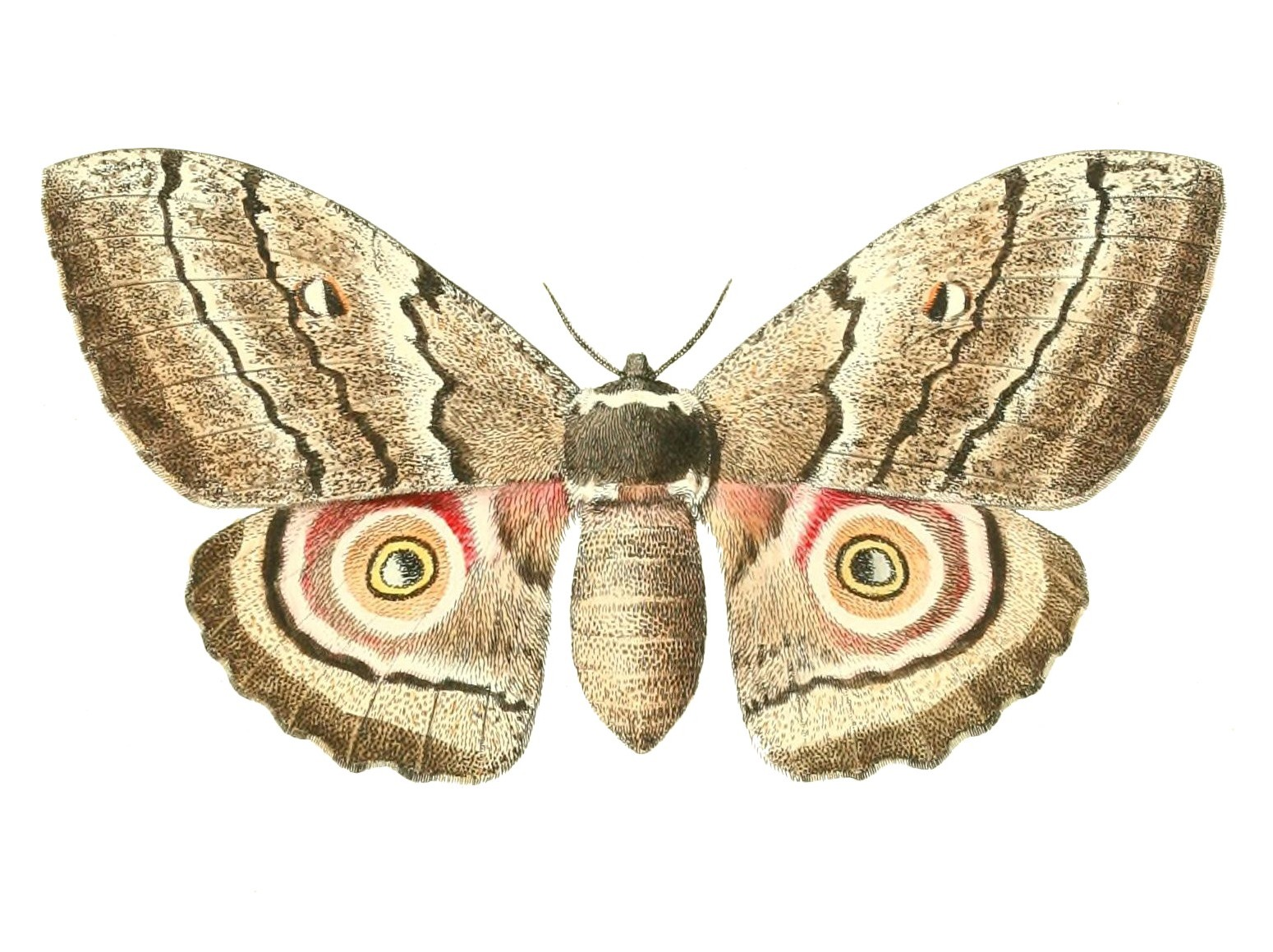
- Gynanisa maja

Scientific classification
- Domain: Eukaryota
- Kingdom: Animalia
- Phylum: Arthropoda
- Class: Insecta
- Order: Lepidoptera
- Family: Saturniidae
- Tribe: Bunaeini
- Genus: Gynanisa; Walker, 1855

Synonyms
- Ancalaespina Wallengren, 1858

= Gynanisa =

Genus of moths

Gynanisa is a genus of moths in the family Saturniidae first described by Francis Walker in 1855.

== Species ==
- Gynanisa arba (Darge, 2008)
- Gynanisa ata Strand, 1911
- Gynanisa basquini Bouyer, 2008
- Gynanisa campionea (Signoret, 1845)
- Gynanisa carcassoni Rougeot, 1974
- Gynanisa commixta (Darge, 2008)
- Gynanisa hecqui Darge, 1992
- Gynanisa jama Rebel, 1915
- Gynanisa kenya (Darge, 2008)
- Gynanisa maja (Klug, 1836)
- Gynanisa meridiei (Darge, 2008)
- Gynanisa minettii Darge, 2002
- Gynanisa murphyi Bouyer, 2001
- Gynanisa thiryi Bouyer, 1992
- Gynanisa uganda (Darge, 2008)
- Gynanisa westwoodi Rothschild, 1895
- Gynanisa zimba (Darge, 2008)
