= Robert Gilbert (bishop) =

15th-century Bishop of London

- Bishop of London
- Elected: 23 February 1436
- Term ended: about 27 July 1448
- Predecessor: Robert FitzHugh
- Successor: Thomas Kempe

Orders
- Consecration: 28 October 1436

Personal details
- Died: about 27 July 1448
- Denomination: Catholic

Robert Gilbert was a medieval Bishop of London.

Gilbert was appointed Dean of the Chapel Royal around 1421.

Gilbert was elected bishop 23 February 1436, provided on 21 May 1436, and consecrated on 28 October 1436. He died about 27 July 1448.

== Citations ==
Catholic Church titles
Preceded by Robert FitzHugh	Bishop of London; 1436–1448	Succeeded by Thomas Kempe
