= Richard Hill (bishop) =

15th-century Bishop of London

- Bishop of London
- Appointed: 21 August 1489
- Term ended: 20 February 1496
- Predecessor: Thomas Kempe
- Successor: Thomas Savage

Orders
- Consecration: 15 November 1489

Personal details
- Died: 20 February 1496
- Denomination: Catholic

Richard Hill (fl. 10 May 1486; died 20 February 1496) was a medieval Bishop of London.

Hill was Archdeacon of Lewes from 1486, until he was provided as Bishop of London on 21 August 1489 and consecrated on 15 November 1489. He also served as Dean of the Chapel Royal between 1485 and 1489.

With a group of supporters around the Court of Arches, including Edward Vaughan, he attempted to undermine the prerogative powers of the Archbishop of Canterbury, at the time John Morton.

== Citations ==
Catholic Church titles
Preceded by Thomas Kempe	Bishop of London; 1489–1496	Succeeded by Thomas Savage
