= Thomas Kempe =

15th-century Bishop of London

- Bishop of London
- Appointed: 21 August 1448
- Term ended: 28 March 1489
- Predecessor: Robert Gilbert
- Successor: Richard Hill
- Previous post: Archdeacon of Richmond

Orders
- Consecration: 8 February 1450

Personal details
- Died: 28 March 1489
- Denomination: Catholic

Thomas Kempe was a medieval Bishop of London.

Kempe was the nephew of John Kemp, Archbishop of Canterbury.

Kempe was provided to London on 21 August 1448 and consecrated on 8 February 1450. He died on 28 March 1489. He had previously held the offices of Archdeacon of York and then Richmond from 1442 to 1448.

There was a memorial to him by the tenth column at the west end of Old St Paul's Cathedral.

== Citations ==
Catholic Church titles
Preceded by Robert Gilbert	Bishop of London; 1448–1489	Succeeded by Richard Hill
