= Cromwellian Parliamentary Surveys =

Survey in 17th century England to determine landholders' acreage and rent

The Parliamentary Surveys were initiated by Oliver Cromwell to evaluate lands which he had confiscated. Primarily they were Crown or Ecclesiastical estate lands in England and the assessments were carried out by a team of surveyors during the period 1647 to 1650. The objective was to identify all landholders in each manor; determine how much land each held and how much rent they paid. The surveyors then made a valuation of what each holding was worth, so that the manor could be put up for sale. The money thus generated was to be used to pay Cromwell's Model Army.

The Surveys were undertaken with a variety of accuracy. Those where the surveyors were able to copy from an existing register kept by the previous landlord are extremely accurate. However, where a register was not available the surveyors held manor court meetings at which all the manor tenants were supposed to appear to present their land holdings. Inevitably not all were keen to do so, and thus the survey results can be incomplete or inaccurate.

Nevertheless, many of the surveys provide an invaluable complete tenant and land census of manors in the mid seventeenth century, where the landlord was the English Crown or the church. Original copies of the surveys are deposited in the Lambeth Palace Library in London. A few are in the National Archives in Kew, London; and some County Record Offices have copies of the Surveys in their region. Some have been transcribed and indexed.

The lands surveyed were then sold to purchasers at a price related to the survey valuations, and on the basis of an assumption that the new owner would have a minimum of 10 years income from the property. This was fortunate as it happened that it was almost exactly 10 years between sale around 1650 and the restoration of the monarchy of Charles II in 1660. It was the reason why upon restoring ownership of the lands to the crown and church in 1661-2, very little compensation was ever paid to the 1650 purchasers. They were deemed to have enjoyed what they had paid for.
