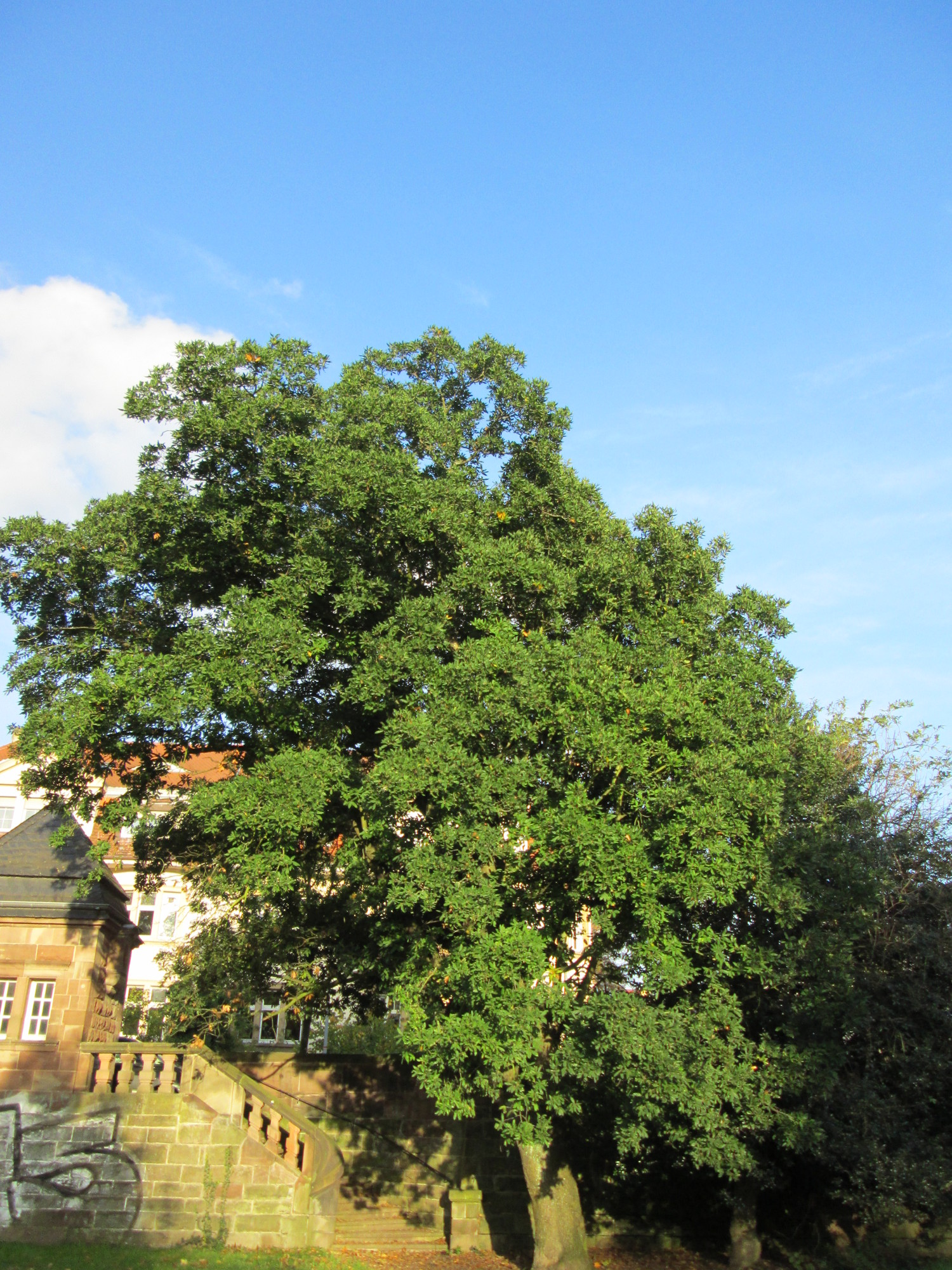

Scientific classification
- Kingdom: Plantae
- Clade: Tracheophytes
- Clade: Angiosperms
- Clade: Eudicots
- Clade: Rosids
- Order: Fagales
- Family: Fagaceae
- Genus: Quercus
- Species: Q. × turneri

Binomial name
- Quercus × turneri Willd.

= Quercus × turneri =

Hybrid species of flowering plant

Quercus × turneri (or Quercus turneri), known as Turner's oak, is a hybrid species of white oak native to Spain. It is a naturally occurring hybrid of holm oak (Quercus ilex) and pedunculate oak (Quercus robur), found where their ranges overlap, but was first described from cultivation. A semi-evergreen tree of small to medium size with a rounded crown, it was originally raised at the Holloway Down Nursery of Spencer Turner, Leyton, Essex, UK, noted by the zoologist Jean-Baptiste Lamarck at Trianon, Versailles in 1783, as the chêne de turnère. (Turner had died in January 1776, and the nursery grounds, on extended lease, returned to the landowner.) An early specimen was planted at the Royal Botanic Gardens, Kew in 1798; it was uprooted in the Great Storm of 1987 but resettled in the ground and then increased its healthy growth. Its 'Pseudoturneri' cultivar has gained the Royal Horticultural Society's Award of Garden Merit.

It is an intersectional hybrid. Quercus ilex is placed in subgenus Cerris, Quercus sect. Ilex. Quercus robur is placed in subgenus Quercus, Quercus sect. Quercus.
