= Reginald Henry Lewis =

English painter (1894–1973)

Field Marshal Bernard Law Montgomery

Reginald Henry Lewis (1894–1973), was an English painter and portrait artist.

Reginald Lewis trained at the Royal Academy and for 7 years was apprenticed to the architect and designer, Sir Frank Brangwyn. He also worked as assistant to Frank Owen Salisbury.
